= Il ritorno d'Ulisse in patria discography =

These lists show the audio and visual recordings of Il ritorno d'Ulisse in patria ("The Return of Ulysses to his Homeland") by Claudio Monteverdi. The opera was premièred in Venice in 1640, initially in five acts, and was then performed in Bologna before returning to Venice for the 1641–42 season. The music was subsequently lost; modern opera productions have been based on editions derived from the sole manuscript score, a three-act version discovered in Vienna in the 19th century. Performances were rare until the 1970s when the work entered the operatic mainstream after stagings in Vienna and at Glyndebourne, both of which were recorded. Since that date recordings have been issued regularly, in five-act, three-act, and two-act versions.

== Recording history ==
The first recording of the opera was issued in 1964, a version incorporating substantial cuts. The first complete recording was that of Nikolaus Harnoncourt and Concentus Musicus Wien in 1971, the first of three Harnoncourt versions in audio and video. Raymond Leppard's 1972 Glyndebourne version was recorded in a concert performance in the Royal Albert Hall; the following year the same Glyndebourne cast was recorded in a full stage performance. These recordings were issued many years later, in compact disc and DVD format. Leppard's third Glyndebourne version was issued in 1980, the heavy orchestration with strings and brass drawing some adverse critical comments.

In 1978 Roger Norrington, with Kent Opera, recorded the only English language version of the opera. A two-act version prepared by the German composer Hans Werner Henze was performed under Jeffrey Tate at the 1985 Salzburg Festival and issued on videotape. After several years, the 1990s and 2000s saw a proliferation of recordings in audio and video formats, including performances under Alan Curtis, René Jacobs, Sergio Vartolo, and William Christie. More than thirty years after his first recording, Harnoncourt produced his 2002 version in DVD format, a live recording from Zürich Opera.

== Audio ==
Year	Cast: Ulisse, Penelope, Telemaco, Minerva, Eumete, Iro	Conductor opera house/orchestra	Label and year of issue	Notes
1964	Gerald English; Maureen Lehane; William Whitesides; Antonia Fahberg; Helmut Kretschmar; Bernhard Michaelis	Rudolf Ewerhart; Santini Kammerorchester (Münster)	LP: Vox DLBX211 (1965)	First recording of the opera but with significant cuts, including the Prologue; Iro's monologue; the scenes with Melanto and Eurymaco.
1971	Sven Olof Eliasson; Norma Lerer; Kai Hansen; Rotraud Hansmann; Max van Egmond; Murray Dickie	Nikolaus Harnoncourt; Concentus Musicus Wien/Junge Kantorei	LP: Telefunken SKB23T (1971); CD: Teldec 2564 69614-2 (2008)	
1972	Benjamin Luxon; Janet Baker; Ian Caley; Anne Howells; Richard Lewis; Alexander Oliver	Raymond Leppard; London Philharmonic Orchestra and Glyndebourne Chorus	CD: Oriel Music Society OMS099/3 (2001)	Live recording of concert performance, Royal Albert Hall, 3 August 1972
1978	Werner Hollweg; Trudeliese Schmidt; Francisco Araiza; Helrun Gardow; Philippe Huttenlocher; Arley Reece	Nikolaus Harnoncourt; Monteverdi Ensemble der Zürich Opera	CD: Teldec 8 35807 (1989)	Recording of a TV film
1978	Neil Jenkins; Sarah Walker; Neil Mackie; Anne Pashley; Wynford Evans; Jack Irons	Roger Norrington; Kent Opera	CD: Oriel Music Society OMS018/3	Sung in English. Recording of live performance at Guildhall School of Music 26 July 1978
1979	Richard Stilwell; Frederica von Stade; Patrick Power; Ann Murray; Richard Lewis; Alexander Oliver	Raymond Leppard; London Philharmonic Orchestra and Glyndebourne Chorus	LP: CBS Masterworks 79332 (1980)	For full details, see Il ritorno d'Ulisse in patria (Raymond Leppard recording)
1985	Thomas Allen; Kathleen Kuhlmann; Alejandro Ramirez; Delores Ziegler; Robert Tear; Curtis Rayam	Jeffrey Tate; ORF Symphonie-Orchester (Wien); Tölzer Knabenchor: Ensemble Spinano	CD: Orfeo C 528 003 (2000)	Recorded at the Salzburg Festival, 18 August 1985 (Hans Werner Henze version)
1991	Leroy Villeneuva; Gloria Banditelli; Mark Tucker; Guillemette Laurens; Giovanni Battista Palmieri; Gian Paolo Fagotto	Alan Curtis; Orchestra - Sonotori de la Gioiosa Marca	CD: Nuova Era 7103-5 (2004)	Live recording of a performance in the Teatro dei Rinnovati, Siena
1992	Christoph Prégardien; Bernarda Fink; Christina Högman; Lorraine Hunt Lieberson; Martyn Hill; Guy de Mey	René Jacobs; Concerto Vocale	CD: Harmonia Mundi (France) HMC 901 427-29 (1992)	Five-act version
1998	Furio Zanasi; Gloria Banditelli; Jean-Paul Fouchécourt; María Cristina Kiehr; Roberto Abbondanza; Gian Paolo Fagotto	Gabriel Garrido; Ensemble Elyma	CD: K617 K617091/3 (1998)	Five-act version
2005	Loris Bertolo; Gabriella Martellacci; Makoto Sakurada; Angela Bucci; Giovanni Gregnanin; Davide Cicchetti	Sergio Vartolo; Instrumental ensemble	CD: Brilliant Classics BRIL 93104 (2006)	Five-act version
2009	Kobie van Rensburg; Christine Rice; Cyril Auvity; Claire Debono; Laura Coronado; Robert Burt	William Christie; Les Arts Florissants	CD: Premiere Opera Ltd. CDNO 3525-3 (2009)	Live recording of a performance in the Teatro Real, Madrid, 25 April 2009
2012	Anicio Zorzi Giustanini; Josè Maria Lo Monaco; Makoto Sakurada; Roberta Mameli; Paolo Antognetti; Luca Dordolo	Claudio Cavina; La Venexiana	CD: Glossa Music (2012)	
2015	Fernando Guimaraes; Jennifer Rivera; Aaron Sheehan; Leah Wool; Daniel Auchincloss; Marc Molomont	Martin Pearlman; Boston Baroque	CD: Linn	New performing edition by Pearlman
2018	Furio Zanasi; Lucile Richardot; Krystian Adam; Hana Blažíková; Francisco Fernández-Rueda; Robert Burt	John Eliot Gardiner; English Baroque Soloists and the Monteverdi Choir	CD: Soli Deo Gloria (2018)	Three-act version
2023	Leonardo De Lisi; Seoyeon Choi, Francesco Nocco, Mira Dozio, Francesco Marchetti; Saverio Bambi	Federico Bardazzi Ensemble San Felice	CD (2023) Bongiovanni	

== Video ==
Year	Cast: Ulisse, Penelope, Telemaco, Minerva, Eumete, Iro	Conductor opera house/orchestra	Label and year of issue	Notes
1973	Benjamin Luxon; Janet Baker; Ian Caley; Anne Howells; Richard Lewis; Alexander Oliver	Raymond Leppard; London Philharmonic Orchestra and Glyndebourbe Chorus	DVD: ArtHaus Musik 101 101 (2006)	Live recording of a stage performance at the Glyndebourne Theatre, 24 August 1973
1978	Werner Hollweg; Trudeliese Schmidt; Francisco Araiza; Helrun Gardow; Philippe Huttenlocher; Arley Reece	Nikolaus Harnoncourt; Monteverdi Ensemble der Zürich Opera	DVD: DG 073 4268 (2007)	Jean-Pierre Ponnelle (stage director) Recording of a TV film
1985	Thomas Allen; Kathleen Kuhlmann; Alejandro Ramirez; Delores Ziegler; Robert Tear; Curtis Rayam	Jeffrey Tate; ORF Symphonie-Orchester (Wien); Tölzer Knabenchor: Ensemble Spinano	VHS (1985)	Recorded at the Salzburg Festival, 18 August 1985 (Hans Werner Henze version)
1998	Antony Rolfe-Johnson; Graciela Araya; Toby Spence; Diana Montague; Diana Montague; Alexander Oliver	Glen Wilson; Orchestra, Het Muziektheatre Amsterdam	DVD: Opus Arte OA 0926D (2005)	Pierre Audi (stage director) Live recording of a performance in Het Muziektheatre, Amsterdam
2002	Kresimir Spicer; Marijana Mijanović; Cyril Auvity; Olga Pitarch; Joseph Cornwell; Robert Burt	William Christie; Les Arts Florissants	DVD: Virgin Classics 7243 4 90612 9 3 (2004)	Adrian Noble (stage director) Live recording of a production originally given in 2000 at the Festival d'Aix-en-Provence. Winner of Royal Philharmonic Society Opera award, 2003.
2002	Dietrich Henschel; Veselina Kasarova; Jonas Kaufmann; Isabel Rey; Thomas Mohr; Rudolf Schasching	Nikolaus Harnoncourt; Orchester La Scintilla	DVD: ArtHaus Musik 100 352 (2003)	Live recording of a performance in the Opernhaus, Zürich, February 2002
2023	Leonardo De Lisi; Seoyeon Choi, Francesco Nocco, Mira Dozio, Francesco Marchetti; Saverio Bambi	Federico Bardazzi Ensemble San Felice	2023 / Bongiovanni	
