= John Fryatt =

British actor and opera singer (1927–2011)

Fryatt as Dr. Graham in English Eccentrics, 1964

John James Fryatt (7 July 1927 – 7 January 2011) was an English actor and opera singer best known for his performance in comic character roles.

Fryatt began his career with the D'Oyly Carte Opera Company in 1952 in Gilbert and Sullivan roles, then Sadler's Wells Opera in 1959, becoming popular in tenor character roles in Offenbach operettas. His international opera career continued from the 1960s to the 1990s, becoming known in the roles of Don Basilio in The Marriage of Figaro and Sellem in The Rake's Progress, among many others. He also played a role in the West End as Roscoe in the 1987 production of Follies.

== Early life and career ==
Fryatt was born in York. From 1950, he studied privately with Frank Titterton and subsequently with Joseph Hislop.

He was engaged by the D'Oyly Carte Opera Company in January 1952, playing Gilbert and Sullivan chorus roles. His first named role there, in 1953, was the small tenor part of the First Citizen in The Yeomen of the Guard. The next year, he was also given the role of Francesco in The Gondoliers. His first leading role was Prince Hilarion in Princess Ida in 1954, followed the next year by the Defendant in Trial by Jury, and he was also given the role of Leonard Meryll in Yeomen. That year, he also occasionally began to play the roles of Ralph Rackstraw in H.M.S. Pinafore, Frederic in The Pirates of Penzance, and Nanki-Poo in The Mikado. In 1957, he was also given the larger role of Luiz in The Gondoliers, while still playing some chorus parts. He also had occasion to play Earl Tolloller in Iolanthe and the Duke of Dunstable in Patience. He left the D'Oyly Carte company in 1959.

Fryatt joined Sadler's Wells Opera in 1959, beginning in the chorus, and became associated with tenor character roles in Wendy Toye's productions of Offenbach operettas in the 1960s. These included the Brazilian in La Vie parisienne, the title role in Orpheus in the Underworld, Menelaus in La belle Hélène and King Bobêche in Bluebeard. Other roles included Pedrillo in The Seraglio, Guillot in Manon, Spalanzani in The Tales of Hoffmann, Monostatos in The Magic Flute and, in the British premiere of Janáček's The Makropulos Case, Count Hauk-Šendorf. He repeated some of his Offenbach roles at the London Coliseum when the Sadler's Wells company became English National Opera (ENO). In 1964 he created the role of Dr. Graham in Malcolm Williamson's opera English Eccentrics, and was singled out by the reviewer Andrew Porter as "deserving special mention". He also created the role of the mute Trim in The Mines of Sulphur in 1965, reprising it with Opera North in 1980. With The New Opera Company, he sang the roles of Mephisto and Jacob Glock in the 1965 British stage premiere of Prokofiev's The Fiery Angel.

He occasionally revisited Gilbert and Sullivan, singing the roles of Cyril in Princess Ida, Richard Dauntless in Ruddigore, and Marco in The Gondoliers, in 1966 for BBC radio, and appearing in the 1982 Brent Walker television productions of Cox and Box (as Mr. Box) and Patience (as Archibald Grosvenor). He returned to Sadler's Wells in 1984 to play the Duke of Plaza-Toro in The Gondoliers. In The Musical Times in 1984, the reviewer Andrew Lamb called Fryatt "a highly amusing North Country Duke of Plaza-Toro."

== Later years ==
Fryatt became known for his portrayal of Don Basilio in The Marriage of Figaro, singing the role at ENO, Glyndebourne Festival Opera and at various opera houses in Britain, Europe and America. In some productions of the opera he played Don Curzio as well as Basilio. He recorded the part of Don Basilio in a cast headed by Dietrich Fischer-Dieskau, Heather Harper and Geraint Evans, conducted by Daniel Barenboim in 1977. Also at Glyndebourne he sang in Il ritorno d'Ulisse in patria, Monsieur Triquet in Eugene Onegin and Sellem in The Rake's Progress, praised by The Independent for his "classic timing". There he also created the role of Captain Lillywhite in the premiere of The Rising of the Moon (1970). He appeared at Rome Opera as Sellem in The Rake's Progress, at Carnegie Hall, as Sportin' Life in Porgy and Bess, with Amsterdam Opera, as Goro in Madama Butterfly and in several character roles at Santa Fe Opera. At London's Royal Opera House, he sang the Dancing Master in Manon Lescaut. One of his last operatic roles was the Emperor Altoum in Turandot, which he played for ENO in 1995. Rodney Milnes, writing in The Times praised Fryatt's performance: "often on a thread of sound, he made every single word tell, he was thinking them, and for a brief moment Turandot sprang into life as living drama rather than just noise."

Fryatt was eager to play in a West End musical. In 1987 he finally achieved this goal, playing Roscoe for nine months in Stephen Sondheim's Follies at the Shaftesbury Theatre. In 1986, together with fellow ex-D'Oyly Carte artist Cynthia Morey, Fryatt wrote a Gilbert and Sullivan pantomime adaptation entitled The Sleeping Beauty of the Savoy. In 1995, they collaborated on Off the Beaten Track, featuring songs from forgotten shows.

After beginning to sing at Glyndebourne, Fryatt moved to nearby Lewes, Sussex. In later years, he was a Vice-President of the Gilbert & Sullivan Society, London. He died in Brighton at the age of 83, and his funeral was at Woodvale Crematorium Brighton on 24 January 2011.

== Recordings ==
Fryatt's opera recordings were:

- The Brazilian in extended excerpts from Offenbach's La Vie parisienne (in English), with Sadler's Wells forces conducted by Alexander Faris (1961).
- Pedrillo in Mozart's The Abduction from the Seraglio (in English), with Bath Festival forces conducted by Yehudi Menuhin (1968).
- Don Basilio in Mozart's Le nozze di Figaro, with Dietrich Fischer-Dieskau, Heather Harper and Geraint Evans, conducted by Daniel Barenboim (1977).
- Cascada in excerpts from Lehár's The Merry Widow, in a cast headed by Joan Sutherland and Valerie Masterson, conducted by Richard Bonynge (1979).
- The turnkey in Vaughan Williams's Hugh the Drover, with Robert Tear as Hugh, conducted by Sir Charles Groves (1979).
- Pisandro in Monteverdi's Il ritorno d'Ulisse in patria, with Richard Stilwell as Ulisse and Frederica von Stade as Penelope, conducted by Raymond Leppard (1980).
- The dance master in Puccini's Manon Lescaut, in a cast headed by Mirella Freni and Plácido Domingo, conducted by Giuseppe Sinopoli (1984).
- The Rector in Britten's Peter Grimes, with Philip Langridge in the title role, conducted by Richard Hickox (1996).

Fryatt also recorded the tenor part in Stravinsky's Pulcinella ballet, conducted by Simon Rattle (1978).

== Television ==
Several of Fryatt's opera productions were televised. His performances on television include the following:

- 1973 The Return of Ulysses to his Homeland, Pisandro
- 1973 Le nozze di Figaro, Basilio
- 1974 Idomeneo, High Priest
- 1975 The Rake's Progress, Sellem
- 1976 Falstaff, Dottor Cajus
- 1978 The Magic Flute, Monostatos
- 1982 Patience, Archibald Grosvenor
- 1982 Cox and Box, Box
- 1983 Manon Lescaut, Dance master
- 1983 Orpheus in the Underworld, Mars
- 1984 Eugene Onegin, Triquet
