= Patrick Power (tenor) =

New Zealand opera singer

Patrick Maurice Power ONZM (born 6 June 1947) is an operatic tenor from New Zealand.

== Biography ==
Power was born In Dannevirke, New Zealand. He was educated at St. Patrick's College, Silverstream, University of Otago, University of Auckland, Auckland Teachers' College, L'Università per Stranieri, Perugia, and the University of Waikato.

He earned a three-year contract with the Norwegian National Opera in 1976 before having positions at opera companies in Krefeld and Munich.

He featured in an episode of the television series Coming Home in 1999.

Since returning to New Zealand in 2000 he has taught at a number of different institutions. He taught at the Eastern Institute of Technology from 2000-2006. He was also a lecturer in voice at the Elder Conservatorium of Music, University of Adelaide from 2009 until he returned again to New Zealand in 2016.

As of 2023 he lives in Hawke's Bay and teaches voice privately and at two local high schools.

== Discography ==
Year	Title	Genre	Collaborators	Label
1978	Monteverdi: Il ritorno d'Ulisse in patria	classical	Raymond Leppard (conductor); London Philharmonic Orchestra; Glynedeborne Chorus; Frederica von Stade (mezzo); Richard Stillwell (baritone)	Sony
1986	Purcell: Dido and Aeneas	classical	Raymond Leppard (conductor); English Chamber Orchestra; Jessye Norman (soprano); Thomas Allen (baritone)	Decca
1987	Beethoven: Symphony No. 9	classical	Roger Norrington (conductor); The London Classical Players; The Schütz Choir of London; Yvonne Kenny (soprano)	EMI
1991	Balfe: The Bohemian Girl	classical	Richard Bonynge (conductor); Irish National Symphony Orchestra	argo
1995	Auber: Le Domino Noir	classical	Richard Bonynge (conductor); English Chamber Orchestra; Sumi Jo (soprano); Bruce Ford (tenor)	Decca
2003	Hummel: Missa Solemnis	classical	Uwe Grodd; New Zealand Symphony Orchestra	Naxos

== Awards ==
In the 2003 Queen's Birthday Honours, Power was appointed an Officer of the New Zealand Order of Merit, for services to opera.
