= Diana Montague =

British mezzo-soprano

Diana Montague Rendall (born 8 April 1953) is an English mezzo-soprano, known for her performances in opera and as a concert singer.

== Biography ==
Montague was born in Winchester and educated at the Testwood School, the Winchester School of Art and the Royal Northern College of Music. She made her professional debut as Zerlina in Don Giovanni with Glyndebourne Touring Opera in 1977 and went on to sing leading mezzo-soprano roles in opera houses throughout Europe and as well as in the United States.

Her ENO debut was as Prosperina in L'Orfeo in 1981, and at Covent Garden her debut was as Nicklausse in Les Contes d'Hoffmann in 1982. She sang Wellgunde and Siegrune in Der Ring des Nibelungen at Bayreuth in 1983.

She made her Metropolitan Opera debut as Annio in La clemenza di Tito on 22 January 1987 and later appeared with the company as Sesto in La clemenza di Tito (1987), Dorabella in Così fan tutte (1988), Cherubino in Le nozze di Figaro (1988), Nicklausse in Les contes d'Hoffmann (1989) and in 2016 she returned after a 27-year absence to sing Gertrude in Roméo et Juliette. In 2013 she sang at Opera Holland Park as Carmela in I gioielli della Madonna by Wolf-Ferrari. In May 2025 she appeared as the Countess in The Queen of Spades at Garsington Opera, an "imperious presence" at her first entrance, later giving "a profound account of her great soliloquy and the Grétry aria".

== Personal life ==
Montague was married to the British tenor David Rendall from February 1990 until his death on 21 July 2025. The marriage produced four children, one of whom is the baritone Huw Montague Rendall. They lived in Brockenhurst, Hampshire.

== Recordings ==
Montague appears on several full-length opera recordings, including the rarities Rosmonda d'Inghilterra, Zoraida di Granata, and Il crociato in Egitto, all for Opera Rara. Her other opera recordings include:

- Le Comte Ory – Count Ory: John Aler; tenor, Isolier: Diana Montague, mezzo-soprano; Countess Adèle: Sumi Jo, soprano; Dame Ragonde: Raquel Pierotti, mezzo-soprano; Alice: Maryse Castets, soprano; Orchestra and Chorus of the Opéra de Lyon conducted by Sir John Eliot Gardiner. Label: Philips
- Iphigénie en Tauride – Iphigénie: Diana Montague, mezzo-soprano; Oreste: Thomas Allen, baritone; Pylade: John Aler, tenor; Monteverdi Choir; Orchestras of the Opéra de Lyon conducted by Sir John Eliot Gardiner. Label: Philips
- Il ritorno d'Ulisse in patria, with Richard Stilwell and Frederica von Stade, conducted by Raymond Leppard. CBS Masterworks.
