= The Rising of the Moon (opera) =

Opera composed by Nicholas Maw

- Opera by Nicholas Maw
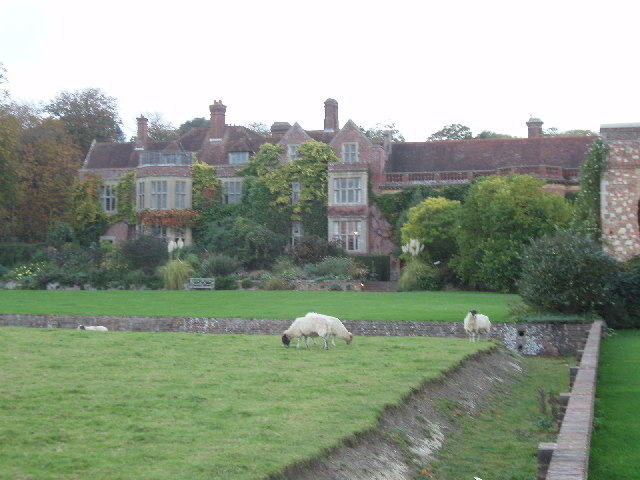
- Glyndebourne House, where The Rising of the Moon premiered
- Librettist: Beverley Cross
- Premiere: 19 July 1970; Glyndebourne Festival

The Rising of the Moon is an operatic comedy in three acts composed by Nicholas Maw to a libretto by Beverley Cross. It premiered on 19 July 1970 at the Glyndebourne Festival conducted by Raymond Leppard and directed by Colin Graham. The title comes from the Irish patriotic song of the same name.

The opera was composed over a period from 1967 to 1970 while Maw was the artist-in-residence at Trinity College, Cambridge. It was Maw's second opera, and like his first, One Man Show, is a comedy. However, while One Man Show was a farce, The Rising of the Moon is in the genre of romantic comedy with a plot about British soldiers stationed in 19th-century Ireland at the time of the Irish famines. Its premiere at Glyndebourne in 1970 during The Troubles, a period of intense ethno-political conflict in Northern Ireland, was "felt to be tactless" by some critics, according to Maw's obituary in The Daily Telegraph. Nevertheless, the opera ran at 90% capacity at Glyndebourne and was revived the following year after Maw had made adjustments to the score. The opera was subsequently performed in Bremen and Graz in 1978 and at the Guildhall School of Music in 1986. It was also revived at the Wexford Opera Festival in 1990.

== Roles ==
Role	Voice type	Premiere Cast, 19 July 1970 (Conductor: Raymond Leppard)
Brother Timothy	tenor	Alexander Oliver
Cornet John Stephen Beaumont	tenor	John Wakefield
Cathleen Sweeney	mezzo-soprano	Anne Howells
Colonel Lord Jowler	bass	Richard Van Allan
Lady Eugenie Jowler, his wife	soprano	Rae Woodland
Major Max von Zastrow	baritone	Peter Gottlieb
Frau Elizabeth von Zastrow, his wife	mezzo-soprano	Kerstin Meyer
Captain Lillywhite, the Adjutant	tenor	John Fryatt
Miss Atalanta Lillywhite, his daughter	soprano	Annon Lee Silver
Corporal of Horse Hayward	bass-baritone	Brian Donlan
Donal O'Dowd	baritone	John Gibbs
The Widow Sweeney	mezzo-soprano	Johanna Peters
Mr Lynch	bass	Dennis Wicks
Gaveston	tenor	
Willoughby	tenor	
Officers and Men of the 31st Royal Lancers

== Synopsis ==
Place: the town of Ballinvourney on the plains of Mayo, Ireland
Time: An autumn day and night in 1875

=== Act 1 ===
The monastery of St Brendan the Less

The opera opens with an aria sung by Brother Timothy, the only remaining monk in a run-down monastery which has been appropriated for the officers' mess of the British Army's 31st Lancers. Cornet Beaumont, a dilettante, has joined the regiment because he likes its uniform. An initiation ceremony is organised: he must smoke three cigars, drink three bottles of champagne and seduce three women before the following day's reveille. Beaumont agrees, but the plan is overheard by the local inhabitants who are no lovers of the English.

=== Act 2 ===
Inside Sweeney's Inn

Beaumont is introduced to the inn, and Lady Jowler and Elisabeth von Zastrow become the first two of his conquests. The third is to be Atalanta, but Cathleen, the innkeeper's daughter, substitutes herself.

=== Act 3 ===
The monastery

Beaumont provides evidence of his conquests to his superiors. This information leads to general embarrassment. Beaumont resigns his commission, the regiment moves out, and Cathleen is devastated. The rest of the locals rejoice, and Brother Timothy provides an appropriate epilogue.

== Sources ==
- Boosey & Hawkes, Maw, Nicholas: The Rising of the Moon (1967–70)
- Daily Telegraph, "Nicholas Maw", 19 May 2009
- Sutcliffe, Tom, "Nicholas Maw: It's the libretto, stupid", The Independent, 29 November 2002
- The Times, "Nicholas Maw: Composer of the opera Sophie's Choice", 20 May 2009
- Walsh, Stephen, "Nicholas Maw's New Opera", Tempo, Vol. 3, Issue 92, March 1970
