= American Light Opera Company =

Semi-professional theatre company

The American Light Opera Company was a semi-professional theatre company performing light operas and musicals in Washington, D.C., from 1960 to 1968. It was founded by a group of former and (at the time) current members of the University of Michigan's Gilbert & Sullivan Society.

== History ==
Its first production, The Mikado, took place on 17 June 1960 at Naval Ordnance Laboratory in White Oak, Maryland. Over the next few years, the company grew rapidly, with five to six productions a season, usually performed in the Lisner Auditorium at George Washington University. The company also performed at the White House, and its chorus appeared several times with Washington's National Symphony Orchestra. The company began to suffer financially once they moved from the smaller Trinity Theatre to the larger Lisner Auditorium, which they had difficulty filling consistently; the financial problems eventually forced them to shut down. Their final performance was West Side Story performed at Western High School in Washington D.C. on 28 January 1968.

Notable past performers with the company include the actress Georgia Engel, the dancer and choreographer George Faison, the opera singer Richard Stilwell, and the performer "Rusty" Russ Thacker. The President and Executive Director of the National Theatre in Washington, D.C., Donn B. Murphy, directed several productions for the company: Show Boat (1961), Finian's Rainbow (1962), South Pacific (1963), The King and I (1964), Camelot (1965) and West Side Story (1966).

Some productions toured to Baltimore, Richmond, and Norfolk, VA.

In April 1985 a reunion of company members was held at the National Theatre.

== Productions ==
- The Mikado (June 1960)
- Gian Carlo Menotti's The Old Maid and the Thief, with Cox and Box (September 1960)
- The Gondoliers (January 1961)
- Brigadoon (June 1961)
- Finians's Rainbow (November 1961); Trinity
- Kiss Me Kate (March 1962)
- Showboat (November 1962); Trinity Theatre, Georgetown
- The Pajama Game (February 1963); Trinity
- South Pacific (May 1963); Trinity
- Gypsy (July 1963); Galludet University Theatre
- Annie Get Your Gun (August 1963); Gallaudet
- Carousel (October 1963)
- Paint Your Wagon (November 1963)
  - scheduled to open the night JFK was assassinated
- The Fantasticks (January 1964)
- Little Mary Sunshine (March 1964)
- Guys and Dolls (May 1964)
- The Music Man (September–November 1964); Trinity
- Once Upon A Mattress (November–December 1964)
- New Moon (January–February 1965)
- The Streets of New York (March 1965)
- Kismet (April 1965); Howard University's Cramton Auditorium for the Cherry Blossom Festival
- Oklahoma! (May 1965)
- The King and I (September 1965); George Washington University Lisner Auditorium
- The Desert Song (December 1965); Lisner
- Carnival (February 1966); Lisner
- Brigadoon (April 1966); Lisner
- My Fair Lady (May 1966); Lisner
- Camelot (September 1966); Lisner
- South Pacific (December 1966); Lisner
  - Originally scheduled to be Tenderloin
- Gentlemen Prefer Blondes (January–February 1967)
- The Sound of Music (March–April 1967)
- How to Succeed in Business Without Really Trying (May–June 1967)
- West Side Story (1968); Western High School

== Sources ==
- Borgen, Betty, History of The American Light Opera Company of Washington, DC, 2003
- Shuster, Alvin, Washington: The New York Times Guide to the Nation's Capital, R. B. Luce, 1967, p. 251
