= Federico Bardazzi =

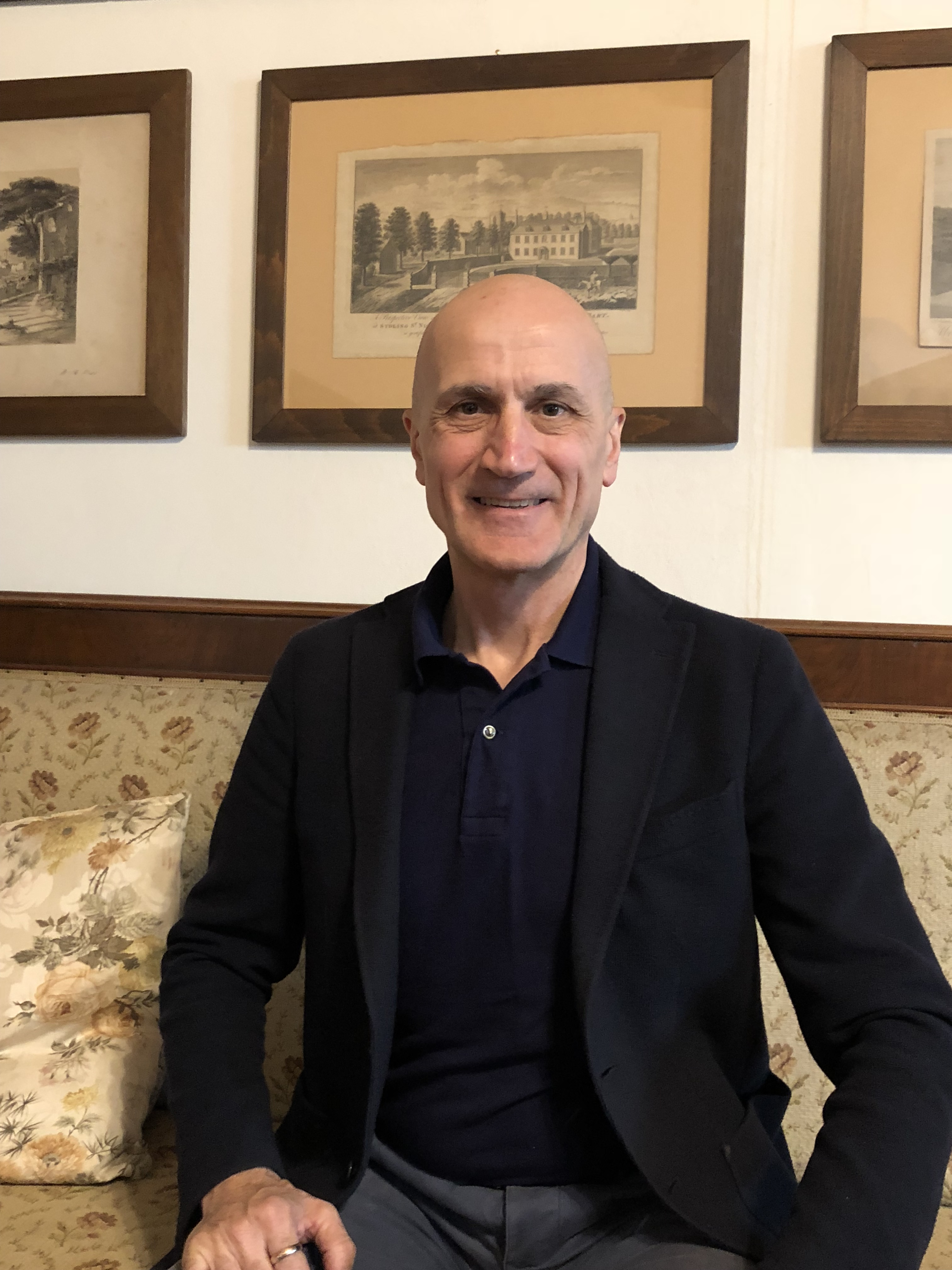
- Born: 1962-04-07; Florence, Italy
- Occupations: Conductor, Musician, Choir Director, Professor

Federico Bardazzi, is an Italian conductor, cellist, researcher, and academic. His work focuses on early music, including Gregorian chant, Medieval monody, and Baroque repertoire. He is active in opera and digital performance projects.

== Early life and education ==
Federico was born on 1962, April 7 in Florence, Italy. In 1975, he began working as a choir conductor and organist at the Pieve di Sant'Alessandro in Giogoli, where he conducted his first Gregorian chant Mass. The following year, he took on the position of organist and choir director at the Certosa of Florence. In 1981, co-founded the Orchestra da Camera Fiorentina. In 1987, he graduated in cello from the Florence Conservatory of Music and continued his studies with André Navarra at the Chigiana Music Academy in Siena. In 1989, he studied orchestral conducting at the Chigiana Academy under Myung Whun Chung. He obtained a degree in orchestral conducting i 1993 and pursued studies in Baroque music, influenced by the productions of Philippe Herreweghe with Collegium Vocale Gent. He also studies Gregorian chant at the AISCGre in Cremona under Johannes Goschl and Nino Albarosa. In 1992, he founded Ensemble San Felice.

== Career ==
In 1995, he worked as a choir director on Jacopo Peri's Euridice, a co-production between the Teatro Comunale of Florence and director Alan Curtis. That same year, he directed Acis and Galatea, a co-production with Kammeroper Frankfurt. In 2000, he directed Handel's Tamerlano in San Gimignano. In 2008, he directed Handel's Rodrigo at the Lufthansa Festival in London, with the production later presented in 2009 at the Teatro della Pergola in Florence. In 2010, he directed Handel's Giustino in Genoa and Brescia. Between 2013 and 2015, he directed several operas, including Pergolesi's II Flamino (co-produced with Teatro Verdi in Pisa), Purcell's The Fairy Queen at Teatro Goldoni in Florence, Scarlatti's II trionfo dell'onore, and Gazzaniga's Don Giovanni o sia il convitato di pietra at the Festival Don Giovanni in Pisa. In 2018, he was involved in the revival of Galuppi's Motezuma at the Puccini Festival and the Salzburger Landestheater. He directed Monteverdi's L'incoronazione di Poppea in 2019 and presented Mozart's Don Giovanni- Gazzaniga in 2020 in co-production with the Cantiere Internazionale d'Arte in Montepulciano.

Since 2020, he has focused on the digital transition in opera, developing the Virtual Stage concept by Carla Zanin, supported by the European Union. Key productions include Monteverdi's L’incoronazione di Poppea (2020), L'Orfeo (2021), and Il ritorno di Ulisse in patria (2022–2023), completing a contemporary exploration of Monteverdi's operatic trilogy, as well as Mozart's Don Giovanni(2021) and Le nozze di Figaro (2022), Rossini's La Cenerentola (2022), and Donizetti's L'elisir d'amore (2022). In 2023, he directed Orfeo & Lwanda at Kenyatta University in Nairobi as part of the European project CAPHE, combining the myth of Orpheus with the Luo legend of Lwanda Magere in a VR live-streamed performance. The project evolved into a VR Opera prototype presented in Poland in 2026. Alongside his conducting activities, Bardazzi has directed cultural, educational, and artistic research projects in the fields of music, opera, and performing arts. Since 2014, he has participated in and coordinated initiatives supported by the Erasmus+, Creative Europe, Horizon Europe, and European Social Fund, Italian Ministries of University and Culture Programmes, focusing on early music, opera, XR and digital innovative performance, vocational training, and international cooperation.

=== Sacred and baroque music ===
In 1995, he recovered works by an anonymous 17th-century author from the National Central Library of Florence. From 1996, he focused on Johann Sebastian Bach productions using Baroque instruments, including the Mass in B minor and complete Motets. In 1997, he engaged with composer Arvo Pärt, creating the program Magnificat featuring Pärt's works alongside medieval and Renaissance pieces, performed on a tour in Germany and Italy. That year, he also produced Andrea Cavallari's Apocalisse, with choreography by Virgilio Sieni, and conducted Mozart's Requiem based on historical and contemporary editions. In 1998, he began work on Carissimi's oratorios, and in 1999, he proposed the medieval music project El cant de la Sibilla. The same year, he conducted Frescobaldi's Mass on the Aria di Fiorenza at the Florence Baptistery for the O flos colende Sacred Music Festival.

Between 2003 and 2008, he conducted all the main Johann Sebastian Bach's choral works, including the Lutheran Masses in F major and G minor, the Johannespassion, the Matthäuspassion, and the Christmas and Easter Oratorios, often incorporating Gregorian liturgical reconstructions. In 2008, he presented the first modern performance of the Vespers of Stiava with Gregorian chant reconstruction. He also worked on various versions of Leçons des ténèbres by Couperin and Delalande, and performed Jan Dismas Zelenka's Lamentations. In 2009, he founded the Baroque Ensemble of Maggio Fiorentino Formazione and conducted Bach's complete Brandenburg Concertos. In 2010, in collaboration with the University of Padua, he developed a program of Scottish Renaissance music based on a Thomas Wode manuscript, performed at multiple festivals. In 2011, he conducted Monteverdi's Vespers of the Blessed Virgin with Gregorian liturgy reconstruction and created a program on Frescobaldi's works featuring 14th-century liturgical chants in canto fratto.

=== Medieval music and Gregorian chant ===
In 1999, he presented El cant de la Sibilla at the Festival dei Due Mondi in Spoleto, marking the beginning of his long-term engagement with medieval music performance and research. In 2000, he developed the program Nigra sum sed Formosa, centered on the cult of Mary in monasteries and courts, featuring Alfonso X's Cantigas de Santa Maria and Gregorian chant vespers.

In 2002, he presented a staged version of the liturgical drama Quem queritis based on Florentine manuscripts. In 2003, he co-founded the Festival in Canto Gregoriano in Florence. Beginning in 2006, he conducted research on Hildegard von Bingen's manuscripts, including a liturgical reconstruction of the Third Nocturn. In 2007, he co-organized the International Association for Gregorian Chant Studies (AISCGre) Congress in Florence, which gathered researchers and choirs worldwide. He served on the AISCGre National Board from 2002 to 2006 and on its International Board from 2009 to 2015. During this time, he performed medieval music at festivals in Italy and internationally, including venues such as the Cathedral of Brussels, the Church of St. Andrew in Cologne, the Florence Baptistery, and the Église de Notre-Dame in Poët-Laval. In 2008, he conducted research on San Zanobi at the University of Tor Vergata in collaboration with Giacomo Baroffio and Agostino Ziino.

In 2015, he directed La Musica della Commedia, a project performed across Italy and Europe, including appearances at the Ravenna Festival and Florence Cathedral. It was a co-production with Teatro della Pergola and the Opera di Santa Maria del Fiore. Developed in collaboration with Carla Zanin, the project later inspired productions such as Homer, Dante & Bob Dylan, and Ékstasi, which explored the medieval practice of contrafactum through the adaptation of both historical and contemporary musical materials.

== Teaching activities ==
In 1991, he co-founded the Centro Studi Musica Siena and the Accademia San Felice (formerly Accademia di San Leonardo in Arcetri). He began teaching at the Bellini Conservatory in Palermo in 1993 and at the Marenzio Conservatory in Brescia in 2003. In 2007, he was invited to teach a course on Gregorian chant and medieval music at the University of Florence. From 2009 to 2015, he served as Director of the Training Academy of the Maggio Musicale Fiorentino. From 2015 to 2021, he served as Director of the Training Agency at the Puccini Festival Foundation alongside Paolo Bellocci. Since 2012, he has taught at the Puccini Conservatory in La Spezia, where, starting in 2021, he has coordinated international relations and projects for CAPHE (Communities and Artistic Participation in Hybrid Environment) and IMSV (In Media Stat Virtus).

In 2015, together with Carla Zanin and Paolo Bellocci, he co-founded Opera Network, a professional training and production centre for artistic and technical professions in musical theatre, later expanding its activities to digital performance, XR technologies, and artistic research.

== Selected discography ==
- 2011 Hildegard von Bingen la sibilla del Reno, O orzchis ecclesia: Ad Matutinum in I Nocturno, Symphonia harmoniae caelestium revelationum, Liber divinorum operum, Ensemble San Felice, Brilliant Classics
- 2015 La musica della Commedia, Ensemble San Felice, Classic Voice - Antiqua
- 2016 Claudio Monteverdi Vespro della Beata Vergine (1610), Ensemble San Felice, Brilliant Classics
- 2017 El cant de la Sibilla, Ensemble San Felice, Brilliant Classics
- 2018 Monteverdi & Gabrieli Easter Celebration Venice 1600, Ensemble San Felice, Brilliant Classics
- 2020 Claudio Monteverdi L'Incoronazione di Poppea, Ensemble San Felice, Bongiovanni
- 2021 Claudio Monteverdi L'Orfeo Ensemble San Felice, Bongiovanni
- 2023 Claudio Monteverdi Il ritorno di Ulisse in patria, Ensemble San Felice, Bongiovanni
- 2023 Georg Friedrich Händel Messiah, Ensemble San Felice, Bongiovanni
- 2025 Ékstasi, Ensemble San Felice, RadiciMusic
