= Dardanus (Raymond Leppard recording) =

- Erato LP: STU 71416

Studio album by Raymond Leppard
- Released: 1981
- Studio: Église Notre-Dame du Liban, Paris
- Genre: Baroque opera
- Length: 119:03
- Language: French
- Label: Erato
- Producer: Michel Garcin

Dardanus
- Erato CD: 4509-95312-2

Dardanus is a 119-minute studio album of Jean-Philippe Rameau's opera, performed by a cast led by José van Dam, Michael Devlin, Veronique Dietschy, Christiane Eda-Pierre, Georges Gautier, Roger Soyer and Frederica von Stade with the Chorus and Orchestra of the National Theatre of the Paris Opera under the direction of Raymond Leppard. It was released in 1981.

== Background ==
After the first staging of Dardanus in 1739, Rameau produced several revised versions of his opera, most notably in 1744. The performing score crafted by Leppard and used in the making of this album is a conflation of this latter version with that of the opera's première. Writing in the album's notes, Leppard asserted that he had "found a way to produce a version of the opera with a dramatic structure which makes theatrical sense in terms of the ebb and flow of tension and relaxation, while preserving most of the best music from both versions." Leppard's version omits Rameau's 1739 prologue, cuts some of his ballet sections and replaces his concluding danced chaconne with a chorus of praise for Venus and Love.

The album was recorded following theatrical performances of Dardanus at the Paris Opera by a cast substantially the same as that of the recording. One of these performances was broadcast by French television, and, while not yet available on DVD, may be viewed online. Leppard has written a lengthy, tragi-comic account of the staging's many travails, which included a clowning violist, an incompetent organist, wire-flown singers squeaking with terror and a director and designer who abandoned the production midway through its run. He summed up Paris's Dardanus as one of the worst experiences of his conducting life, an agonizing episode that left a permanent scar on his psyche.

== Recording ==
The album was recorded using analogue technology in November 1980 in the Église Notre-Dame du Liban, Paris.

== Packaging ==
The cover of the LP edition of the album features a photograph from the Paris Opera production mentioned above. The cover of the CD edition, designed by Mister Brown, shows a detail of Nicolas Poussin's Le jugement de Salomon, a painting in the Louvre, photographed by Hubert Josse.

== Critical reception ==
=== Reviews ===
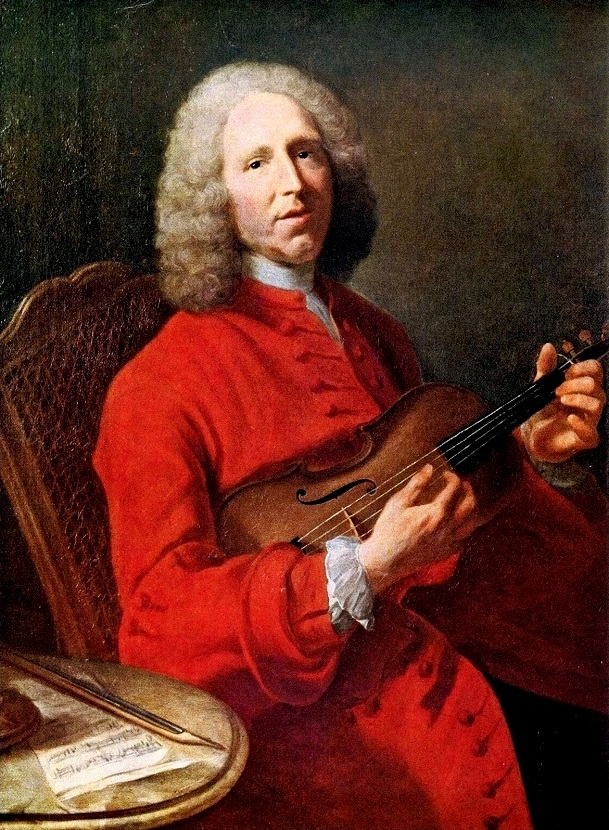
Jean-Philippe Rameau portrayed by Joseph Aved, circa 1728

Lionel Salter reviewed the album on LP in Gramophone in May 1981. Noting that Rameau's 1739 and 1744 versions of Dardanus both had strengths and weaknesses, he agreed with Leppard that when it came to compiling a working edition of the piece, "conflation [offered] the best solution". This said, he was not altogether happy with how Leppard had gone about his task. Some beautiful music had been discarded, and some awkward key-sequences had been introduced. About the performance that Leppard had elicited, on the other hand, there was little negative that could be said. Christiane Eda-Pierre was "radiant" as Vénus, lovely in her dea ex machina arrival in Act 4, florid in her virtuoso climactic aria. Frederica von Stade was almost as impressive, singing "intelligently and expressively" although challenged by a tessitura uncomfortably high for her and sometimes singing with a more pronounced vibrato than usual. Of the male singers, the best was José van Dam as the magician Isménor, "noble in tone, with a fine, ringing high register, and most impressive in his invocation of the supernatural powers". Georges Gauthier was courageous in the stratospheric title role, even if its demands inevitably bleached some of the colour out of his voice. Michael Devlin's Anténor had a soldierly sturdiness, although he was not as eloquent as Gérard Souzay had been when singing one of Anténor's arias on a 1964 recital album. The one grave disappointment in the cast was Roger Soyer as King Teucer. His voice was "dry and worn", his important Act 1 duet with Devlin was "singularly ineffective" and he conveyed "no suggestion of terror or urgency" when announcing the arrival of a Godzilla-like sea monster. All of the soloists sang with flawless enunciation; they also made "a very fair shot at the unfamiliar technique of French baroque ornamentation". The chorus sang as though from the heart. Conducting, Leppard imparted "his characteristically alert rhythmicality" to the orchestra, making the opera "tingle with life right from the outset". Salter acknowledged that Dardanus was obscure, and that its libretto was a fanciful one - a tale of ill-starred lovers, sorcery, knight-errantry and divine intervention. But he concluded by advising his readers to "sample its riches".

Eric Salzman reviewed the album on LP in Stereo Review in April 1982. He did not share Salter's reservations about Leppard's editing. Leppard, he wrote, had "succeeded in arranging this difficult and trouble-ridden work so that it functions". Of the soloists, José van Dam was probably the best, but Frederica von Stade and Michael Devlin were strong too; the one disappointment was Georges Gauthier. But the true stars of the album were Leppard and Rameau himself. Leppard's conducting was "brilliant, clear, precise - and yet moving." From his soloists, his chorus and his orchestra alike, he had elicited "a certain liveliness, an articulation and intensity ... that [were] very engaging." He had "helped both singers and musicians to find a legitimate-sounding style without sacrificing to antiquity anything in the way of vigour, pathos, mystery or enchantment". As for Rameau, Salzman exhausted the thesaurus in hymning him to high heaven. His score was wonderful, superb, graceful, charming, delightful, a masterpiece of orchestration and, he insisted, "always real and powerful stage music", lyric drama that could be spoken of in the same breath as that of Monteverdi, Mozart, late Verdi or Wagner. Well recorded and beautifully balanced, the album was "an essential documentation of Rameau's art".

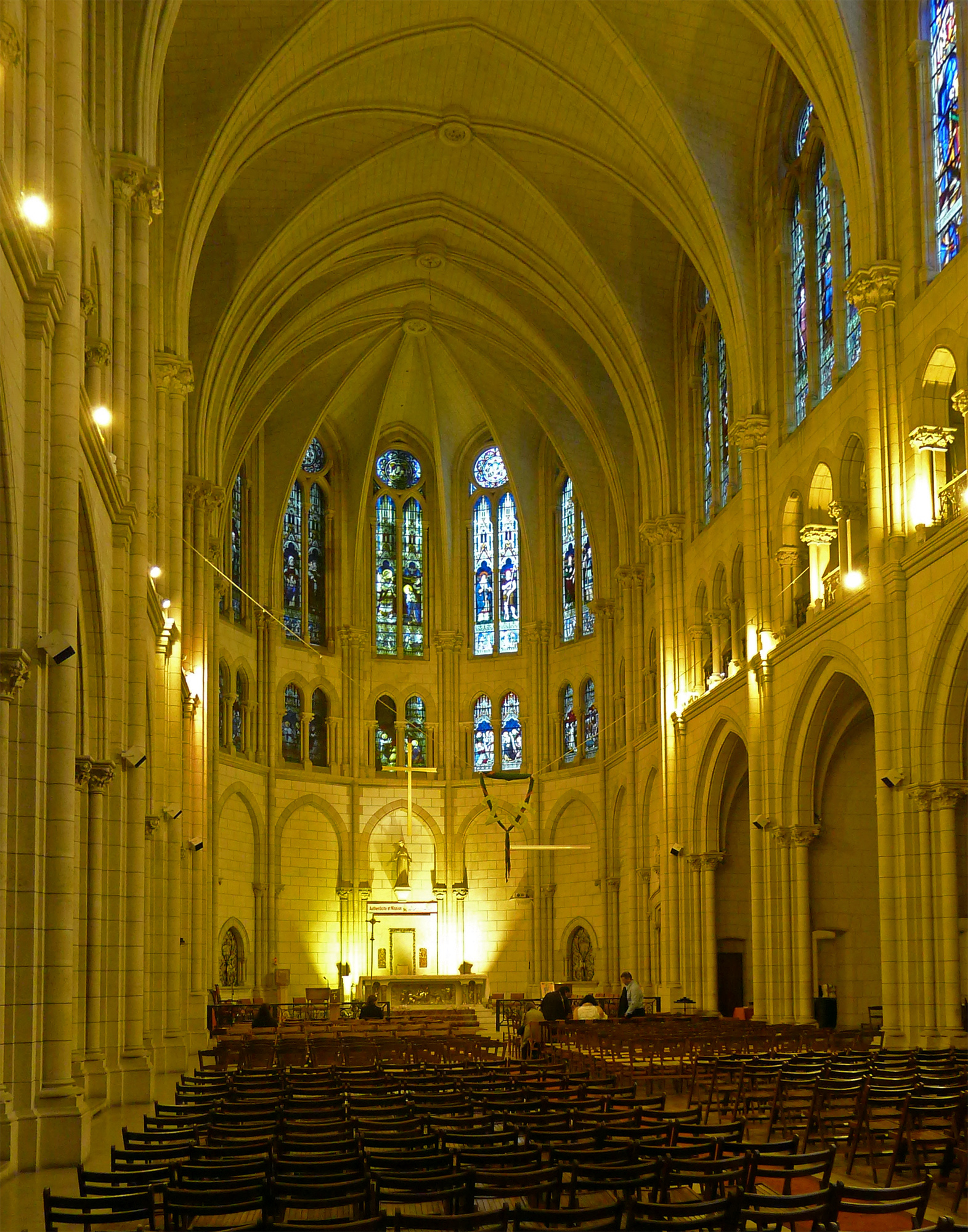
Paris's Maronite Catholic church of Our Lady of Lebanon, where the album was taped

Nicholas Anderson reviewed the album on silver disc in Gramophone in May 1995. Rameau's 1739 and 1744 versions of Dardanus were so different, he thought, that conflating them had given to rise to problems which Leppard had been unable to solve convincingly. His cuts were so severe - omitting, for instance the prologue and the concluding elegiac chaconne - that the music which he had left out would have filled most of a third CD. He had also added "an organ which played no part in Rameau's orchestra" and "a very anachronistic, Italianate cello solo". Anderson found Leppard's cast a mixture of good and bad. Like Salter and Salzman, he thought José van Dam's Isménor unequivocally magnificent. Frederica von Stade's Iphise was "ravishingly beautiful-sounding", but not sung in an authentically Ramellian style. Georges Gauthier had the vocal resources for his part yet was dull and sometimes insecure. Michael Devlin was forgettable, and Roger Soyer worse. Yet despite all the album's defects, there was at that time no alternative available, and Anderson encouraged his readers to give Leppard's reading a try. Most of Dardanus showed Rameau in good form, and some parts of it - like Iphise's "O jours affreux", Anténor's "Monstre affreux" or the Trio of Dreams - were gorgeous. The album's audio quality was excellent.

=== Accolade ===
Writing in Gramophone in December 1981, Lionel Salter included the album in his Critic's Choice list of the best recordings of the year.

== Track listing: CD1 ==
Jean-Philippe Rameau (1683-1764)

Dardanus (1739), lyric tragedy in five acts, with libretto by Le Clerc de la Bruère, in a performing edition by Raymond Leppard

- 1 (4:57) Overture

Act One

- 2 (4:03) "Cesse, cruel amour" (Iphise)
- 3 (0:42) "Ma fille, enfin le ciel" (Teucer, Iphise)
- 4 (2:14) "Princesse, après l'espoir" (Anténor, Iphise, Teucer)
- 5 (1:40) "Mânes plaintifs" (Teucer, Anténor)
- 6 (2:24) "Par des jeux éclatants" (Chorus)
- 7 (1:04) "Mars, Bellone, guidez nos coups" (Anténor, Teucer, Chorus)
- 8 (2:12) Rigaudons I and II
- 9 (1:32) "Guerriers, je remplirai" (Anténor, Iphise)
- 10 (1:21) Majestic march of the warriors

Act Two

- 11 (2:15) "Tout l'avenir est présent" (Isménor)
- 12 (3:51) "On vient c'est Dardanus" (Isménor, Dardanus)
- 13 (1:15) "Hâtons-nous, commençons" (Chorus)
- 14 (2:34) Slow air, "Suspends ta brillante carrière" (Isménor)
- 15 (4:32) Fast air, "Nos cris ont pénétré" (Isménor)
- 16 (1:27) "Obéis aux lois des Enfers" (Chorus)
- 17 (4:10) "Quelqu'un vient" (Isménor, Anténor, Dardanus)
- 18 (3:55) "Je la vois" (Dardanus, Iphise)
- 19 (5:48) "D'un penchant si fatal" (Iphise)
- 20 (1:59) "Dardanus gémit dans nos fers" (Chorus)

== Track listing: CD2 ==
Act Three

- 1 (4:39) "O jours affreux" (Iphise)
- 2 (4:27) "Elle gémit" (Anténor, Iphise)
- 3 (2:03) "Que l'on chante" (Chorus)
- 4 (4:32) Divertissements: Rigaudons I and II, Minuets I and II
- 5 (0:38) "Volez, Plaisirs, volez" (Phrygian woman)
- 6 (2:12) Tambourins I and II
- 7 (4:47) "Cessez vos jeux" (Teucer, Anténor), Symphony

Act Four

- 8 (6:31) "Lieux funestes" (Dardanus)
- 9 (4:50) "Ami tender et fidèle" (Dardanus, Isménor)
- 10 (2:13) "Malgré le Dieu des mers" (Vénus)
- 11 (2:28) "Par un sommeil agréable" (Three Dreams, Chorus)
- 12 (2:17) "Un monstre furieux" (Dream)
- 13 (2:26) "La gloire vous appelle" (Three Dreams, Chorus)
- 14 (1:29) "Où suis-je" (Dardanus)
- 15 (4:55) "Voici les tristes lieux" (Anténor)
- 16 (2:02) "Mon rival va périr" (Dardanus, Anténor)

Act Five

- 17 (1:03) "Anténor est victorieux" (Chorus)
- 18 (4:33) "Triomphez, héros généreux" (Teucer, Iphise, Anténor, Dardanus, Chorus)
- 19 (4:19) "Pour célébrer les feux" (Vénus)
- 20 (2:44) "Chantons la Reine" (Chorus, Iphise, Dardanus, Teucer)

== Personnel ==
=== Musicians ===
- Christiane Eda-Pierre (soprano), Vénus
- Georges Gautier (tenor), Dardanus, son of Jupiter and Electra
- Roger Soyer (bass-baritone), Teucer, King of Phrygia
- Frederica von Stade (mezzo-soprano), Iphise, daughter of Teucer
- Michael Devlin (bass-baritone), Anténor, King of a neighbouring country
- José van Dam (bass), Isménor, a magician
- Veronique Dietschy (soprano), a Phrygian Woman
- Hélène Garetti, a Dream
- Annick Dutertre, a Dream
- Monique Marandon, a Dream
- Jean-Philippe Courtis, a Dream
- Jean Mallandaine, harpsichord continuo
- Dominique My, harpsichord continuo
- Gérard Parmentier, organ continuo
- Michel Tournus, cello continuo
- Philippe Cheron, cello continuo
- Jean-Marc Rollez, double bass continuo
- Jean-Pierre Logerot, double bass continuo
- Chorus of the National Theatre of the Paris Opera (chorus master: Jean Laforge)
- Orchestra of the National Theatre of the Paris Opera
- Raymond Leppard (1927-2019), conductor

=== Other ===
- Michel Garcin, producer
- Pierre Lavoix, balance engineer
- Yolanta Skura, assistant engineer
- Tim Oldham, mastering engineer

== Release history ==
In 1981, Erato released the album as a double LP (catalogue number STU 71916) with a booklet including notes and libretti in English, French and German. The album was not released on cassette.

In 1994, Erato issued the album as a double CD (catalogue number 4509-95312-2) with a 96-page booklet providing libretti, synopses, notes about the opera by Philippe Beaussant and notes about Leppard's edition by Leppard himself, all in English, French and German.
