= Annon Lee Silver =

Canadian lyric soprano singer (1938–1971)

- Born: November 18, 1938; Glace Bay, Cape Breton, Nova Scotia, Canada
- Died: July 28, 1971 (aged 32); London, England, United Kingdom
- Education: Mount Allison University; Royal College of Music
- Occupation: Lyric soprano
- Spouse: Ronald Lumsden
- Children: 1

Annon Lee Silver (November 18, 1938 – July 28, 1971) was a Canadian lyric soprano singer. She made her opera debut at the Glyndebourne Festival Opera in 1963 and had leading operatic roles throughout her career. Silver was a member of the Oper Frankfurt and performed with the Phoenix Opera and the Welsh National Opera. She gave master classes on BBC Television and performed at The Proms.

== Early life and education ==
On November 18, 1938, Silver was born in Glace Bay, Cape Breton, Nova Scotia, Canada. She was encouraged by her parents in the art of singing, having remembered her parents taking her to air force and army bases when she was aged three or four. Silver earned Bachelor of Music and Bachelor of Arts degrees from Mount Allison University in New Brunswick in 1958. She later went to the United Kingdom on both a Canada Council grant and a Beaverbrook scholarship to attend the Royal College of Music in London. Silver studied under Cuthbert Smith and Maggie Teyte. Following her first year, she was invited to tea by Max Aitken, 1st Baron Beaverbrook and he was impressed by her aspirations and singing that he renewed Silver's scholarship for the next year. She supplemented her studying teaching at a London secondary school. Silver's abilities were noticed by the voice pedagogues Frederick Husler and Yvonne Rodd-Marling and studied under them in Darlington, England and Switzerland.

== Career ==
She made her opera debut at Glyndebourne Festival Opera in 1963, performing the role of Amor in L'incoronazione di Poppea by Claudio Monteverdi. Silver also performed at multiple concerts and recitals, with one such performance as Mother Earth at the annual druid ceremony at Stonehenge. Her studying in Switzerland led her to perform as Amor at Glyndebourne for the second time and further engagements in Canada and Europe. Silver also had leading operatic roles including Monteverdi's Il ballo delle ingrate, John Blow's Venus and Adonis, The Beggar's Opera and Hansel and Gretel among others. She won the 1966 Dame Maggie Teyte prize. Silver performed with the Montreal Symphony Orchestra at Expo 67, and recorded for the Canadian Broadcasting Corporation after she received the top vocal award at the JMC Centennial Competition. She also won the second prize in the vocal competition in the 21st World Congress of the International Federation of Jeunesses Musicales. In 1969, she sung the role of Sophie in Michael Redgrave's production of Werther at Glyndebourne.

That same year, Silver became a member of the Oper Frankfurt, singing in several leading roles and frequently appeared in broadcasts, concerts, opera and recitals in the United Kingdom and Europe. She created the role of Atlanta for the 1970 production The Rising of the Moon by Nicholas Maw. Silver sung Pamina in The Magic Flute by the touring company. Other roles Silver performed in were Blondchen at the Bath Festival's production of The Abduction from the Seraglio, Norina in Don Pasquale with the Phoenix Opera, Rigoletto with the Welsh National Opera in the part of Gilda, Marzelline in Fidelio at the Grand Théâtre de Genève, and multiple parts with the Oper Frankfurt such as Zerlina in Don Giovanni over a period of two years. She gave master classes alongside Carl Ebert and Gerald Moore for BBC Television and, with the Amadeus String Quartet, performed Mozart arias. Silver performed at The Proms and took the leading roles in the Mozart operas Zaide and The Impresario.

At the time of her death, she was due to perform in Benjamin Britten's Cantata academica at the last night of the 1971 Proms and was going to appear at the Edinburgh Festival. Silver was also due to reprise her role of Atlanta in Maw's The Rising of the Moon at Glyndebourne.

== Personal life ==
She had a son with her husband, the pianist Ronald Lumsden. In the late 1960s, Silver noticed a lump on one of her breasts, and subsequent tests diagnosed breast cancer. The lump was removed but the cancer had spread. On July 28, 1971, Silver died at a London hospital. Her body was repatriated to Canada for a memorial service at her home town. Silver was buried at Oakfield Cemetery, Marion Bridge, Cape Breton.

== Legacy ==
Her obituary in The Times said she would be remembered for "her voice of unmistakable, individual quality and... her particular vivacious charm and endearing personality." It was written in The Musical Times that "her bright, clear voice and her vivacious, charming personality made her justly popular." Zelda Heller of the Montreal Gazette noted the middle and upper registers of her voice projected "Purity and a really beautiful bell-like sound character".
