= Rae Woodland =

British soprano

Rae Woodland (9 April 1922 – 12 December 2013) was a British soprano who studied with Roy Henderson. Her debut was as Queen of the Night at Sadlers Wells. She sang in many European festivals, and debuted at Covent Garden in La sonnambula with Joan Sutherland and Luciano Pavarotti. She was first asked to sing for Benjamin Britten on the English Opera Group's tour of Russia, and played many roles for him subsequently. She also created roles for Gottfried von Einem, Nicholas Maw and Sir Arthur Bliss, and made many live broadcasts for the BBC, from the RAH Proms to Friday Night is Music Night. She retired from the opera stage in 1984. She then taught singing at the Royal Academy of Music in London, and at the Britten-Pears School in Snape Maltings on the invitation of Sir Peter Pears.

== Early and personal life ==
She was born in Nottingham, but her hare lip meant that she was sent away to a convent school in Warwickshire. Her parents were hoteliers, and moved often. For her secondary education, she returned to Nottingham and the Mundella School, where her talent for singing became evident. At fifteen, she was taken to the pioneers of reconstructive surgery, Harold Gillies and Archibald McIndoe, whose work on her hare lip made it invisible. She married Denis Stanley, an engineer. They began married life near Sheffield, and moved to London when her career required it. They spent their retirement in Suffolk, and are buried together in Snape churchyard.

== Career ==
Her formal training began at the advice of a judge in a northern singing competition, who sent her to London where she auditioned for Roy Henderson, the distinguished, independent teacher of Kathleen Ferrier. On their first meeting, 'Prof', as his students called him, told her she was a soprano, not a mezzo, as she had previously thought. He saw her potential, and warned her the training would take seven years, but also recommended a visit to Bond Street, to 'see how the ladies dress', as he feared she looked 'a little bit provincial'. Woodland took to heart his advice on her appearance, but always saw the funny side of it.

Once she was trained, Henderson sent her to Lotte Lehman, who recommended a scholarship to the National School of Opera, then run by Joan Cross. It was there that Woodland was asked to sing 'Queen of the Night' at Sadlers Wells, to cover for an indisposed soprano. This became one of her signature roles, for her dramatic coloratura voice was ideal both for the tessitura and the power required to invoke hellish vengeance.

Despite turning down Vittorio Gui's offer to move to La Scala, she remained busy in Britain and Europe, and was thought to be the first English soprano to share the Covent Garden stage with Luciano Pavarotti, where she sang Lisa to Joan Sutherland's Amina in La Sonnambula, to much acclaim. She sang at the BBC Proms on many occasions, including for Stokowski's premier of Mahler's Resurrection Symphony, with Janet Baker.

She said "Sadler's Wells made me, and Glyndebourne was the icing on the cake" and performed many roles in both houses. Her Mimi, in La Bohème at Sadler's Wells earned the admiration of Lord Lurgan, who had studied and toured as a baritone (William Brownlow) with Melba, before he inherited the title. He presented Woodland with two Puccini scores which had come from his association with Melba.

She also created several new roles, including The Rising of the Moon for Nicholas Maw, Der Besuch der alten Dame for Gottfried von Einem, and Rout for Sir Arthur Bliss, who wrote Angels of the Mind for her. Woodland also developed a lasting relationship with Benjamin Britten and Peter Pears, singing and touring in their English Opera Group, and often performing at the Aldeburgh Festival. She eventually moved to Suffolk, near Snape Maltings.

== Retirement ==
Woodland retired from the opera stage in 1984 and began teaching at the Royal Academy of Music, then, at the invitation of Peter Pears, at the Britten-Pears School for Advanced Musical Studies.

== Recordings ==
- Bliss: Rout, with the London Symphony Orchestra under Sir Arthur Bliss (Lyrita)
- Bliss: The Olympians Polyphonia Orchestra, Ambrosian Singers, under Bryan Fairfax, live at the Royal Festival Hall, 1972
- Graun: Montezuma (Pilpatoè) Ambrosian Singers, London Philharmonic, under Richard Bonynge, (Decca Reissue 1999)
- Handel: Messiah, under John Tobim, (ABC 1976)
- Mahler: Symphony No. 2, with Janet Baker, BBC Chorus and Choral Society and the London Symphony Orchestra under Leopold Stokowski, live recording, BBC Proms, 1963
- Mendelssohn: A Midsummer Night's Dream, with Helen Watts, London Philharmonic, under Bernard Haitink (Philips)
- Mozart: Idomeneo (Elettra) with Peter Pears, Heather Harper, under Benjamin Britten, 1969
- Mozart: Idomeneo (Elettra) with Jessye Norman, Nicolai Gedda, under Colin Davis, Live recording, Rome Opera, 1971
- Novello: Glamorous Night (Militza) with Monica Sinclair, and Robert Thomas under Marcus Dods, circa 1964 (EMI LP TWO-243)
- Rameau: Hippolyte et Aricie (Diana) with Janet Baker, Robert Tear, John Shirley-Quirk, under Anthony Lewis, conductor, (Decca/L'oiseau Lyre), 1966
- Strauss: Intermezzo (Notary's Wife) with Felicity Lott, John Pringle, Elizabeth Gale, under Gustav Kuhn (conductor), 1983, Glyndebourne (Warner)
- Verdi: Macbeth (the Lady-in-waiting) with Kostas Paskalis, Josephine Barstow, under John Pritchard, Glyndebourne, 1972 (Arthaus Musik)
