= Ann Murray =

Irish mezzo-soprano

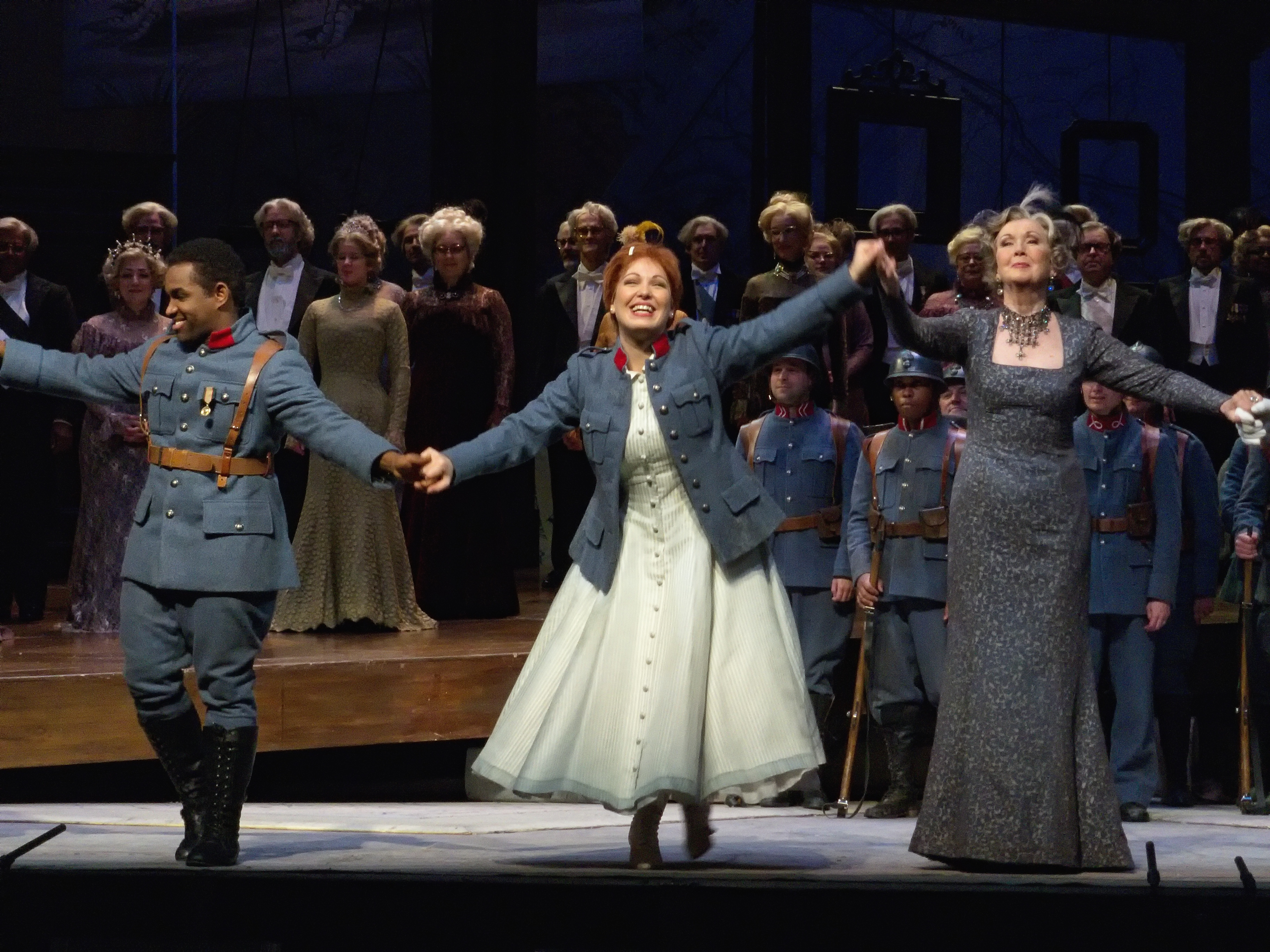
Final curtain call of the Metropolitan Opera's 24 December 2011 performance of La fille du régiment (l to r) Lawrence Brownlee (Tonio), Nino Machaidze (Marie), and Ann Murray (Marquise)

Ann Murray DBE (born 27 August 1949) is an Irish mezzo-soprano.

== Life and career ==
Murray was born in Dublin. Having won a number of prizes at the Feis Ceoil, she studied singing at the College of Music (now the DIT Conservatory of Music and Drama, Dublin) with Nancy Calthorpe, as well as arts and music at University College Dublin. In 1968, she made her Irish opera debut performing the shepherd role in a concert performance of Tosca. She pursued further studies with Frederic Cox at the Royal Manchester College of Music and made her stage debut as Alcestis in Christoph Willibald Gluck's Alceste in 1974. Murray made her debut in 1981 at the Salzburg and the Zurich Festivals. She has since sung at all major opera houses and is particularly noted for her performances in works by George Frideric Handel, Wolfgang Amadeus Mozart and Richard Strauss.

Murray performs mainly at Covent Garden (where she performed as Siphare in Mozart's Mitridate, re di Ponto), the English National Opera and the Bavarian State Opera. Murray was the featured singer in volume three of the Hyperion Schubert Edition, Hyperion Records' complete Franz Schubert lieder project, in 1988, led by pianist Graham Johnson.

She maintains her links with Ireland and was a patron of the Young Associate Artists Programme of Dublin's Opera Theatre Company. In September 2010, she was appointed professor of singing at the Royal Academy of Music in London, where she was previously (since 1999) an honorary fellow.

== Awards and honours ==
She received an honorary doctorate in music from the National University of Ireland in 1997. She was made Bavarian Kammersängerin in 1998.

In 2002, she was made an Honorary Dame Commander of the Order of the British Empire in the Diamond Jubilee Honours for her services to music.

She was awarded the Bavarian Order of Merit in 2004.

== Personal life ==
Murray was married to the English tenor Philip Langridge. The couple had one son, Jonathan, also a tenor.

== Recordings ==
- Mozart: Mass No. 18 in C Minor KV427 (with Amor Artis Chorale, English Chamber Orchestra, cond. Johannes Somary: LP, Vanguard, 1976)
- Donizetti: Lucia di Lammermoor (with Ambrosian Opera Chorus, New Philharmonia Orchestra, cond. Jesús Lopez-Cobos: LP, Philips, 1977; re-issued CD, 1991)
- Verdi: La Battaglia di Legnano (with Austrian Radio Chorus & Symphony Orchestra, cond. Lambert Gardelli: LP, Philips, 1979; re-issued CD, Philips, 1989)
- Gay: The Beggar's Opera, arr. Bonynge/Gamley (with London Voices, National Philharmonic Orchestra, cond. Richard Bonynge: LP, Decca, 1981)
- Charpentier: Te Deum H.146, Magnificat H.74, with Academy Chorus of St. Martin-in-the-Fields, conducted by Neville Marriner. CD Emi Classics 1991
- Stravinsky: Songs (with Ensemble Intercontemporain, cond. Pierre Boulez: LP, Deutsche Grammophon, 1982; re-issued CD, 1992)
- Haydn: Stabat mater (with Lausanne Vocal Ensemble & Chamber Orchestra, cond. Michel Corboz: LP, Erato, 1983)
- Purcell: Dido and Aeneas (with Arnold Schoenberg Choir, Vienna Concentus Musicus, cond. Nikolaus Harnoncourt: LP, Telefunken, 1983)
- Gounod: Romeo et Juliette (with Midi-Pyrenées Regional Choir, Toulouse Capitole Chorus & Orchestra, cond. Michel Plasson: LP, HMV, 1985)
- Offenbach: Les Contes d'Hoffmann (with Chorus & Symphony Orchestra of the Brussels Opéra National du Théâtre Royal de la Monnaie, cond. Sylvain Cambreling: LP/CD, EMI, 1988)
- Brahms/Schumann: Voices of the Night (The Songmakers' Almanac: CD, Hyperion, 1989)
- Hyperion Schubert Edition vol.3 (with Graham Johnson, pf: CD, Hyperion, 1989)
- Mozart: Cosi fan tutte (with Vienna State Opera Chorus, Vienna Philharmonic Orchestra, cond. James Levine: LP/CD, Deutsche Grammophon, 1989)
- Berlioz: L'Enfance du Christ op.25 (with Choir of King's College Cambridge, Royal Philharmonic Orchestra, cond. Stephen Cleobury: MC/CD, EMI, 1990)
- Mahler: Songs from 'Des Knaben Wunderhorn' (with London Philharmonic Orchestra, cond. Charles Mackerras: CD, Virgin Classics, 1991)
- Purcell: The Fairy Queen (with The Sixteen Choir & Orchestra, cond. Harry Christophers: CD, Collins Classics, 1992)
- Vivaldi: Gloria in D major RV589 (with Academy of St Martin in the Fields Chorus & Orchestra, cond. Neville Marriner: LP/CD, EMI, 1992)
- Rossini: La Cenerentola (with Vienna State Opera Chorus, Vienna Philharmonic Orchestra, cond. Riccardo Chailly: CD, Pioneer, 1993)
- The Last Rose of Summer: Best Loved Songs of Ireland (with Graham Johnson, pf: CD, Hyperion, 1993; re-issued 2005)
- De Falla: El sombrero de tres picos (with Academy of St Martin in the Fields, cond. Sir Neville Marriner: CD, EMI, 1994)
- Beethoven Folksong Arrangements vols 1 & 2 (with Marieke Blankestijn, vn, Elizabeth Layton, vn, Krysia Osostowicz, vn, Ursula Smith, vc, Malcolm Martineau, pf: CD, Deutsche Grammophon, 1997)
- Irish Songs: Bid Adieu (with Graham Johnson, pf: CD, Forlane, 1998)
- Songs by Bizet (with Graham Johnson, pf: CD, Hyperion, 1998)
- Fauré Requiem/Duruflé Requiem (with Corydon Singers, English Chamber Orchestra etc.: CD, Hyperion, 1998)
- Vivaldi: Juditha triumpharis RV644 (with The King's Consort Choir, The King's Consort, cond. Robert King: CD, Hyperion, 1998)
- L. Boulanger: D'un matin du printemps etc. (with City of Birmingham Symphony Orchestra Chorus, BBC Philharmonic Orchestra, cond. Yan Pascal Tortelier: CD, Chandos, 1999)
- Handel: Serse (with Bavarian State Opera Chorus & Orchestra, cond. Ivor Bolton: CD, Farao Classics, 2000)
- Hummel: Mass in E flat etc. (with Collegium Musicum 90, cond. Richard Hickox: CD, Chandos Chaconne, 2004)
- The Songs of Robert Schumann vol. 9 (with Felicity Lott, S, Graham Johnson, pf: CD, Hyperion, 2004)
- Britten, Mahler, Schumann (with Malcolm Martineau, pf: CD, Avie/Crear Classics, 2005)

== See also ==
- List of honorary British knights and dames
- Monteverdi: Il ritorno d'Ulisse in patria (Raymond Leppard recording)

== Bibliography ==
- "Soprano Is Discovery of 1968 Feis Ceoil", The Irish Times, 18 May 1968
- "Memoranda: Busy Singer", The Irish Times, 29 September 1979
- Edward Seckerson: "The Right Repertoire", Gramophone 65 (December 1988), p. 933
- Gus Smith: Irish Stars of the Opera (Dublin, 1994), p. 113–30
- David Nice: "Murray: Mezzo Ann Murray on the Art of Opera", Gramophone 71 (May 1994), p. 26–29
- Michael Dervan: "Songs in the Key of Home", The Irish Times, 15 January 1999, p. 14
