= Il ritorno d'Ulisse in patria (Raymond Leppard recording) =

- CBS Masterworks LP, M3 35910

Studio album by Raymond Leppard
- Released: 1980
- Studio: Henry Wood Hall, London
- Genre: Baroque opera
- Length: 166:36
- Language: Italian
- Label: CBS Masterworks
- Producer: David Mottley

Il ritorno d'Ulisse in patria ("The return of Ulysses to his homeland") is a 166-minute studio album of Claudio Monteverdi's opera, performed by a cast of singers headed by Ann Murray, Patrick Power, Frederica von Stade and Richard Stilwell with the Glyndebourne Chorus and the London Philharmonic Orchestra under the direction of Raymond Leppard. It was released in 1980.

== Background and recording ==
During 1–26 June 1979, the album's soloists, chorus, orchestra and conductor gave ten performances of the opera at Glyndebourne. (Glyndebourne's staging was produced by Peter Hall and revived by Patrick Libby, with sets and costumes designed by John Bury and lighting designed by Robert Bryan.) The album was recorded using analogue technology on 4–22 June 1979 in the Henry Wood Hall, London.

The performing score used in the making of the album was Leppard's own edition of 1972, in which some of Monteverdi's music is discarded, music of Leppard's own composition interpolated and Monteverdi's orchestration greatly enriched.

== Cover art ==
The cover of the album shows von Stade and Stilwell on stage at Glyndebourne during the opera's concluding scene, in which Penelope acknowledges that the apparent stranger who has come to Ithaca claiming to be Ulysses is indeed her husband.

== Critical reception ==
=== Reviews ===
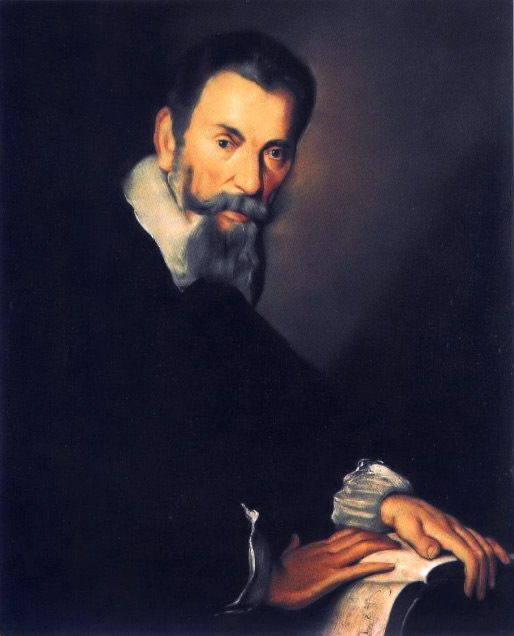
Claudio Monteverdi portrayed in Venice by Bernardo Strozzi in 1640

The musicologist Denis Arnold reviewed the album on LP in Gramophone in December 1980, comparing it with earlier versions of the opera conducted by Rudolf Ewerhart and Nikolaus Harnoncourt. Ann Murray and Patricia Parker were deft in their minor roles, he thought, but their starrier colleagues were less satisfactory. Frederica von Stade, he conceded, "does sing uncommonly well, with some delicious veiled tone to convey Penelope's anguish". But some of her music had had to be transposed into the wrong key, and she was too young to play Penelope plausibly. "Penelope need not be portrayed as an old woman, but at least her face has been lined by the troubles of her life; Miss von Stade is far too attractive for us not to suspect that the suitors are after her body as well as the throne". Ewerhart's Maureen Lehane was much more au fait with Monteverdi's phrasing and accentuation than von Stade, and more successful too at expressing Penelope's "pathos and dignity". Penelope's husband was also better sung on Ewerhart's LPs than on Leppard's. Ewerhart's Gerald English had a much better grasp of Monteverdi's idiom than Leppard's Richard Stilwell, and presented a Ulisse who was convincing in sounding as though his return to his homeland had refreshed his weary soul. Orchestrally, Leppard's London Philharmonic sounded heavy-handed after one had heard Ewerhart's smaller Santini Chamber band. The score that Leppard used on his album was the edition that he had assembled himself, and it had both good points and bad. He had addressed the lacunae in the opera's Vienna urtext with great skill, composing a missing ballet, for instance, that could easily be mistaken for one of Monteverdi's Scherzi Musicali. But he had written an aria for Penelope that sounded incongruous, and he had been unwise to recompose the scene in which Penelope's suitors take turns to try to bend Ulisse's bow. His use of a large orchestra was justifiable in principle - the earliest extant score of the opera had been found in Vienna, and Viennese court productions if the early 1600s were believed to have deployed a wide assortment of instruments. However, the way in which he used his resources was ill-judged. Much music for which Monteverdi had wanted only a simple bass continuo had been augmented with strings and brass. The result was that "the expressive movement between recitative, arioso and aria is obscured ... and the music becomes monotonous". Moreover, the richness of Leppard's orchestration diverted listeners' attention away from his singers and their words. Leppard's album was exciting, and would be welcomed by devotees of Glyndebourne, but Ewerhart's was definitely preferable.

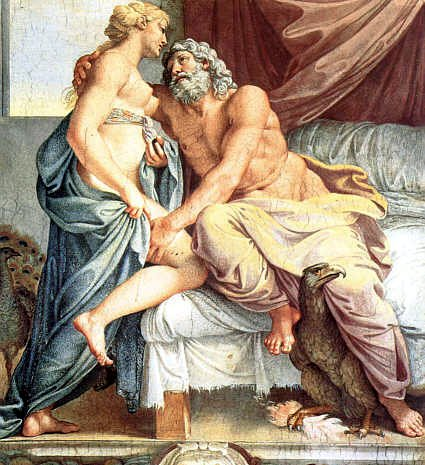
Ulysses's benefactors, Juno and Jupiter, portrayed by one of the Carracci family

J. B. Steane reviewed the album on LP in Gramophone in January 1981. After failing to get to Glyndebourne's staging of the opera in 1979, he wrote, he had consoled himself with imagining that the festival's grapes had been sour. The production could not have been as good as had been claimed. But now that Raymond Leppard's album had appeared, "gloriously vivid in humanity and splendour", there was no doubting that the grapes had been sweet indeed. Richard Stilwell and Frederica von Stade performed Monteverdi's eloquent music with "noble restraint and sincerity". "Von Stade", he wrote, "has probably never had a role that draws so fully upon her special character as an artist". At the emotional zenith of her performance, the moment when Penelope at last permitted herself to have faith that her long years of separation from her husband were about to end, "the beauty of voice and character are exactly matched - as with some other great operatic performances of the past, the identity is complete". A debt of gratitude was owed to Leppard for his realization's "great scrolls and flourishes of harp and harpsichords [and its] majesty of organs and solemn brass". Leppard's dramatic interpretation was complemented by a sound quality that was equally, unapologetically bold.

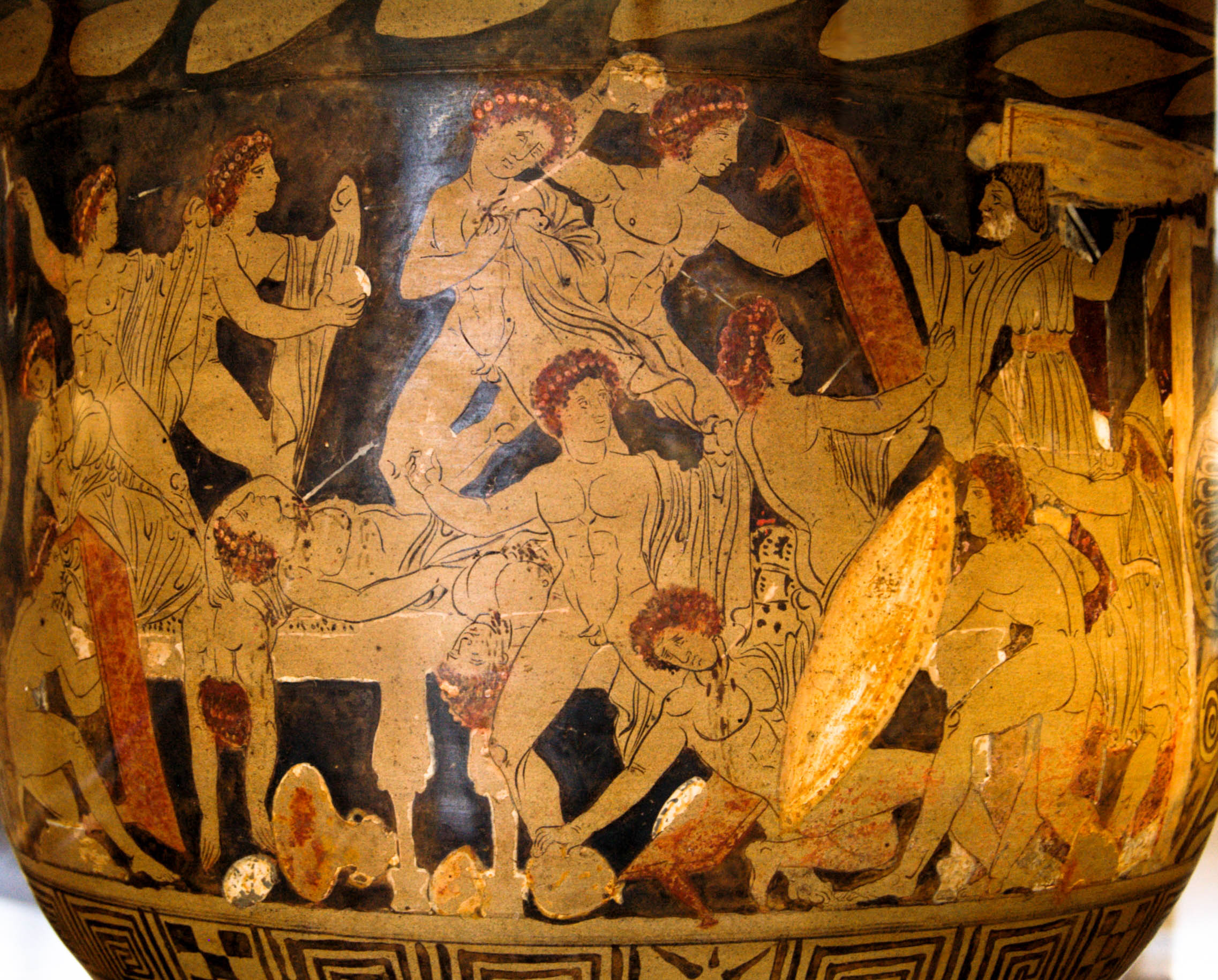
The slaying of Penelope's suitors, depicted by an unknown artist in circa 330 BCE

Stoddard Lincoln reviewed the album on LP in Stereo Review in April 1981. Frederica von Stade, he thought, was excellent as Penelope. Longing for her husband to come back to her; blending flirtatiousness with "sinister charm" in her management of her loathsome suitors; glowing with hope that her ordeal might eventually end; stricken with fear that the man who seemed to be Ulysses might not be; rhapsodic in her recognition that her prayers had finally been answered: in every chapter of Penelope's narrative arc, she was totally convincing. Richard Stilwell was just as impressive as a Ulysses of unwavering determination, and the secondary roles were all well taken too, with Richard Lewis a notably idiomatic old shepherd and Alexander Oliver both pathetic and absurd as a gourmandizing halfwit. Raymond Leppard's reworking of Monteverdi's score was so radical as to amount to a metamorphosis. Monteverdi's sparsely accompanied declamation was enveloped in a constricting quasi-symphonic structure that was at times reminiscent of Richard Strauss. But even though Leppard's treatment of his source material was undeniably anachronistic, it was also "extremely effective", indeed "stunning" - what Monteverdi has left as a skeleton of a piece had been changed into an opera "full of drama and lyricism". We were "fortunate to have such a superb performance committed to records".

David Shengold mentioned the album in Opera News in December 2016 while reviewing an anthology of von Stade's recordings which included several excerpts from it. "The magnificent Ritorno d'Ulisse, he wrote, "... is subjected to Raymond Leppard's syrupy, swooning 'realization', which now sounds risible, but - however lavishly transposed and ornamented - it's inspiring to hear von Stade's bereft Penelope".

=== Accolades ===
The album was nominated for a Grammy award for the best operatic recording of 1981. It was also included in Stereo Review's 1981 list of the best records of the year.

== Track listing, CD 1 ==
Claudio Monteverdi (1567–1643)

Il ritorno d'Ulisse in patria, SV 325 (Venice, 1639-1640 carnival season), with a libretto by Giacomo Badoaro (1602–1654) after The Odyssey by Homer; abridged and realized by Raymond Leppard

- 1 (8:43) Prologo (L'Umana Fragilità, Il Tempo, La Fortuna, Amore)

Act One

Scene 1

- 2 (11:53) "Di misera regina non terminate mai dolente affanni!" (Penelope, Ericlea)

Scene 2

- 3 (7:18) "Duri e penosi son gli amorosi fieri desir" (Melanto, Eurimaco)
- 4 (2:03) Sinfonia

Scene 5

- 5 (7:35) "Superbo è l'uom" (Nettuno, Giove)

Scene 6

- 6 (2:30) "In questo basso mondo" (Coro di Feaci, Nettuno)

Scene 7

- 7 (4:44) "Dormo ancora o son desto?" (Ulisse)

Scene 8

- 8 (11:46) "Cara e lieta gioventù che disprezza empio desir" (Minerva, Ulisse)

Scene 9

- 9 (2:40) "Tu d'Aretusa a fonte in tanto vanne" (Minerva, Ulisse)

== Track listing, CD 2 ==
Act One, continued

Scene 10

- 1 (6:24) "Donate un giorno, o Dei, content a' desir miei" (Penelope, Melanto)

Scene 11

- 2 (1:49) "Come, oh come mal si salva un Regio amante" (Eumete)

Scene 12

- 3 (1:23) "Pastor d'armenti può prati e boschi lodar" (Eumete, Ulisse)

Scene 13

- 4 (3:12) "Ulisse generoso! Fu nobile intrapresa" (Eumete, Ulisse)

Act Two

Scene 1

- 5 (2:34) "Lieto cammino, dolce viaggio" (Telemaco, Minerva)

Scene 2

- 6 (4:57) "Oh gran figlio d'Ulisse! È pur ver che tu torni" (Eumete, Ulisse, Telemaco)

Scene 3

- 7 (5:45) "Che veggio, ohimè, che miro?" (Telemaco, Ulisse)
- 8 (0:42) Sinfonia

Scene 5

- 9 (9:17) "Sono l'altre regine coronate di servi e tu d'amanti" (Antinoo, Pisandro, Anfinomo, Penelope)

Scene 7

- 10 (1:38) "Apportater d'altre novella vengo!" (Eumete, Penelope)

Scene 8

- 11 (6:52) "Compagni, udiste? Il nostro vicin rischio mortale" (Antinoo, Anfinomo, Pisandro, Eurimaco)

Scene 9

- 12 (3:32) "Perir non può chi tien per scorta il Cielo" (Ulisse, Minerva)

Scene 10

- 13 (2:04) "Io vidi, o pellegrin, de' proci amanti l'ardir infermarsi" (Eumete, Ulisse)

Scene 11

- 14 (3:33) "Del mio lungo viaggio i torti errori già vi narrari" (Telemaco, Penelope)
- 15 (3:05) "Voglia il ciel" (Penelope)

== Track listing, CD 3 ==
Act Two, continued

Scene 12

- 1 (4:28) "Sempre villano Eumete" (Antinoo, Eumete, Iro, Ulisse, Telemaco, Penelope)
- 2 (14:09) "Generosa regina!" (Anfinomo, Penelope, Pisandro, Telemaco, Antinoo, Ulisse)

Act Three

Scene 1

- 3 (5:14) "O dolor, o martir che l'alma attrista!" (Iro)

Scene 3

- 4 (1:13) "È quai nuovi rumori, è che insolite stragi" (Melanto, Penelope)

Scene 4

- 5 (1:31) "Forza d'occulto affetto raddolcisce il tuo petto" (Eumete, Penelope)

Scene 5

- 6 (1:15) "E saggio Eumete, e saggio!" (Telemaco, Penelope, Eumete)

Scene 6

- 7 (1:59) "Fiamma e l'ira, o gran Dea, foco è lo sdegno" (Minerva, Giunone)

Scene 7

- 8 (6:00) "Gran Giove, alma de' Dei, Dio delle menti" (Giunone, Giove, Nettuno, coro in Cielo, coro marittimo, Minerva)

Scene 8

- 9 (4:00) "Ericlea, che vuoi far, vuoi tacer o parlar?" (Ericlea)

Scene 9

- 10 (0:22) "Troppo incredula!" (Eumete, Telemaco)

Scene 10

- 11 (10:26) "O delle mie fatiche meta dolce e soave" (Ulisse, Penelope, Ericlea)

== Personnel ==
=== Musical ===
- Diana Montague (mezzo-soprano) as L'Umana Fragilità (Human frailty)
- Ugo Trama (bass) as Il Tempo (Time) and Antinoo (Antinous), suitor to Penelope
- Lynda Russell (soprano) as La Fortuna (Fortune)
- Kate Flowers (soprano) as Amore (Cupid)
- Keith Lewis (tenor) as Giove (Jupiter)
- Roger Bryson (bass) as Nettuno (Neptune)
- Ann Murray (mezzo-soprano) as Minerva
- Claire Powell (mezzo-soprano) as Giunone (Juno)
- Richard Stilwell (baritone) as Ulisse (Ulysses), King of Ithaca
- Frederica von Stade (mezzo-soprano) as Penelope, Ulysses's wife
- Alexander Oliver (tenor) as Iro (Irus), a foolish glutton
- Patrick Power (tenor) as Telemaco (Telemachus), Ulysses's son
- John Fryatt (1927–2011, tenor) as Pisandro (Pisandrus), suitor to Penelope
- Bernard Dickerson (tenor) as Anfinomo (Anfinomus), suitor to Penelope
- Richard Lewis (1914–1990, tenor) as Eumete (Eumaeus), a shepherd
- Nucci Condò (mezzo-soprano) as Ericlea (Euryclea), Ulysses's nurse
- Max Rene Cossotti (tenor) as Eurimaco (Eurymachus), Melantho's lover
- Patricia Parker (mezzo-soprano) as Melanto (Melantho), Penelope's maid
- Glyndebourne Chorus as Chorus of Phaeacians, Naiads, Chorus in Heaven, Chorus of the waters
- London Philharmonic Orchestra
- Raymond Leppard (1927–2019), abridger, realizer and conductor

=== Other ===
- David Mottley, producer

== Release history ==
In November 1980, CBS Masterworks released the album as a triple LP (catalogue number M3 35910), with a libretto containing texts, translations, notes and photographs from the stage production of the opera that was mounted at Glyndebourne in 1979 in conjunction with the making of the recording. The album was never issued on cassette.

In 2016, Sony issued the album as a triple CD (catalogue number 88985345922), with a 16-page booklet offering a synopsis of the drama.
