= Raymond Leppard =

British-American conductor and harpsichordist (1927–2019)

Raymond Leppard CBE
- Born: Raymond John Leppard; 11 August 1927; London, England
- Died: 22 October 2019 (aged 92); Indianapolis, Indiana, U.S.
- Citizenship: United Kingdom; United States
- Education: Trinity College, Cambridge
- Occupations: Conductor; Harpsichordist; Composer; Editor
- Organizations: English Chamber Orchestra; BBC Northern Symphony Orchestra; Indianapolis Symphony Orchestra

Raymond John Leppard CBE (11 August 1927 – 22 October 2019) was a British-American conductor, harpsichordist, composer and editor. In the 1960s, he played a prime role in the rebirth of interest in Baroque music; in particular, he was one of the first major conductors to perform Baroque opera, reviving works by Claudio Monteverdi, Francesco Cavalli and Jean-Philippe Rameau. He conducted operas at major international opera houses and festivals, including the Glyndebourne Festival where he led the world premiere of Nicholas Maw's The Rising of the Moon, the Metropolitan Opera and the Royal Opera House. He composed film scores such as Lord of the Flies and Alfred the Great.

== Life and career ==
Leppard (pronounced LEPP-ard) was born in London and grew up in Bath, where he was educated at the City of Bath Boys' School, now known as Beechen Cliff School. He studied harpsichord and viola at Trinity College, Cambridge, and became interested in choral conducting.

In 1952, he made his London debut at Wigmore Hall in London, conducted his own Leppard Ensemble. He became closely associated with the Goldsbrough Orchestra, which became the English Chamber Orchestra in 1960. Also, he gave recitals as harpsichordist, and was a fellow of Trinity College and a lecturer in music from 1958 to 1968. He retired from his post as Director of Music at Trinity College in 1968.

His interest in early music prompted him to prepare several realisations of scores from the period. While musicologists considered his editions controversial, his performances were important for introducing early operatic masterpieces to the general public. In 1962, he prepared a performing score of Monteverdi's L'incoronazione di Poppea for a production at the Glyndebourne Festival. He subsequently edited Monteverdi's other surviving stage works, L'Orfeo and Il ritorno d'Ulisse in patria, as well as operas by Francesco Cavalli and Jean-Philippe Rameau. He conducted several of his realisations both in the theatre and in the recording studio.

In 1963, he composed the original film score for Peter Brook's Lord of the Flies, the adaptation of William Golding's novel. His other film work included composing the score to Alfred the Great (1969), and arranging the music for Laughter in the Dark (1969) and The Hotel New Hampshire (1984).

In November 1969, he made his American debut conducting the Westminster Choir and the New York Philharmonic, at which occasion he also appeared as soloist in Joseph Haydn's Harpsichord Concerto in D major. In 1973 he became principal conductor of the BBC Northern Symphony Orchestra in Manchester (now the BBC Philharmonic), a position he retained until 1980.

Leppard conducted Britten's Billy Budd at the Metropolitan Opera and the San Francisco Opera, as well as Gluck's Alceste and Handel's Alcina at the New York City Opera. He also conducted at the Royal Opera House in London, in Paris, at the Hamburg State Opera, the Santa Fe Opera, in Stockholm and Geneva.

In September 1986 Raymond Leppard conducted the BBC Symphony Orchestra, Singers and Chorus at the Last Night of the Proms in the Royal Albert Hall, London.

At Glyndebourne, he conducted the world premiere of Nicholas Maw's The Rising of the Moon. From 1987 to 2001, Leppard was the music director of the Indianapolis Symphony Orchestra, where he collaborated with concertmaster Hidetaro Suzuki. From 2004 to 2006, he served as music advisor to the Louisville Orchestra.

In 1973, the Republic of Italy conferred upon him the title of Commendatore della Republica Italiana for services to Italian music. He received an Honorary Degree of a Doctor of Letters by the University of Bath in 1973. He was appointed a Commander of the Order of the British Empire (CBE) by Queen Elizabeth II in 1983. Leppard became an American citizen in 2003. He died in Indianapolis on 22 October 2019. He bequeathed his extensive archive of opera realisations to the Royal Conservatoire of Scotland.

Leppard received a total of 7 Grammy Award nominations during his career:

- Best Opera Recording in 1970 (for L'Ormindo)
- Best Choral Performance in 1973 (for Monteverdi: Madrigals, Books 8, 9 & 10)
- Best Choral Performance in 1974 (for Monteverdi: Madrigals, Books 3 & 4)
- Best Opera Recording in 1981 (for Monteverdi: Il ritorno d'Ulisse in patria; see more here)
- Best Choral Performance in 1984 (for Bach: St. Matthew Passion)
- Best Classical Album in 1984 (for Trumpet Concertos, with Wynton Marsalis)
- Best Classical Album in 1985 (for Wynton Marsalis Plays Handel, Purcell, Torelli, Fasch & Molter)

== See also ==
- Monteverdi: Il ritorno d'Ulisse in patria (Raymond Leppard recording)
- Rameau: Dardanus (Raymond Leppard recording)
- Frederica von Stade: Monteverdi & Cavalli Arias (Raymond Leppard recording)

Cultural offices
Preceded by Hubert Stanley Middleton	Organist and Master of the Choristers of Trinity College, Cambridge; 1958–1968	Succeeded by Richard Marlow
Preceded by John Nelson	Music Directors, Indianapolis Symphony Orchestra; 1987–2001	Succeeded by Mario Venzago
