= Richard Stilwell (bass-baritone) =

American baritone

Richard Stilwell III (born May 6, 1942, in St. Louis, Missouri) is an American operatic and concert baritone.

After graduating from Indiana University in 1966, Stilwell joined the United States Army Chorus in Washington He appeared as a soloist with the Chorus singing the tribute: "One Small Step" in a national telecast with the returning astronauts of Apollo 11 and President Richard Nixon. He also appeared with the American Light Opera Company.

Stilwell sang Billy Budd in the premiere of Britten's Billy Budd at the Metropolitan Opera, directed by John Dexter, and The Lodger in the premier of Dominick Argento's The Aspern Papers alongside Frederica Von Stade and Elisabeth Söderström. He appears alongside Frederica von Stade in the landmark recording of Pelléas et Mélisande under the baton of Herbert von Karajan, and as the voice of Count Almaviva (from Le nozze di Figaro) and Don Giovanni in the 1984 film, Amadeus.

On DVD, Stilwell can be seen in Götz Friedrich's film of Falstaff (with Karan Armstrong and Gabriel Bacquier, conducted by Sir Georg Solti, 1979), La bohème from the Met (with Teresa Stratas, Renata Scotto, and José Carreras, in Franco Zeffirelli's production, 1982), and Robert Wilson's production of Madama Butterfly (2003).

After serving for 16 years as artist-faculty at Roosevelt University’s Chicago College of Performing Arts, Stilwell is now retired.

== See also ==
- Debussy: Pelléas et Mélisande (Herbert von Karajan recording)
- Monteverdi: Il ritorno d'Ulisse in patria (Raymond Leppard recording)

== Sources ==
- Myers, Eric, Reunion: Richard Stilwell,Opera News, June 2006, volume 70, number 12
- Biography on Columbia Artists Management (archived version)
