= Mozart Requiem discography =

This is a discography of the Requiem by Wolfgang Amadeus Mozart.

In the following table, ensembles playing on period instruments in historically informed performance are marked by a green background under the header Instr..

Recordings of Mozart's Requiem
Conductor / Choir / Orchestra	Soloists	Label	Year	Instr.
Bruno Kittel (Musiker) Bruno-Kittel-Chor Berliner Philharmoniker	Tilla Briem; Gertrude Freimuth; Walther Ludwig; Fred Drissen	Polydor	1941	
Josef Krips Wiener Hofmusikkapelle Wiener Philharmoniker	Werner Pech; Hans Breitschopf; Walther Ludwig; Harald Pröglhöf	London	1950	
Josef Messner Salzburg Cathedral Choir Salzburg Mozarteum Orchestra	Hilde Güden; Rosette Anday; Julius Patzak; Josef Greindl	performed at the Salzburger Festspiele in the Aula Academica	1950	
Robert Shaw Robert Shaw Chorale RCA Victor Orchestra	Yvonne Ciannella; Doris Okerson; Walter Carringer; Raymond Keast	RCA Victor	1950	
Hans Schmidt-Isserstedt NDR Chor NDR Orchestra	Lisa Della Casa; Maria von Ilosvay; Helmut Krebs; Gottlob Frick	Tahra	1952	
Hermann Scherchen Wiener Akademie Kammerchor Orchestra of the Vienna State Opera	Magda László; Hilde Rössel-Majdan; Petre Munteanu; Richard Standen	Westminster	1953	
Rudolf Kempe Chor der St. Hedwigs-Kathedrale Berlin Berlin Philharmonic	Elisabeth Grümmer; Marga Höffgen; Helmut Krebs; Gottlob Frick	His Master's Voice	1955	
Eugen Jochum Vienna State Opera Chorus Vienna Philharmonic	Irmgard Seefried; Gertrude Pitzinger; Richard Holm; Kim Borg	Deutsche Grammophon	1955	
Bruno Walter Vienna State Opera Chorus Vienna Philharmonic	Lisa Della Casa; Ira Malaniuk; Anton Dermota; Cesare Siepi	Orfeo d'Or	1956	
Bruno Walter Westminster Choir New York Philharmonic	Irmgard Seefried; Jennie Tourel; Léopold Simoneau; William Warfield	Columbia Masterworks	1956	
Karl Böhm Vienna State Opera Chorus Vienna Symphony	Teresa Stich-Randall; Ira Malaniuk; Waldemar Kmentt; Kurt Böhme	Philips	1956	
Hermann Scherchen Wiener Akademie Kammerchor Orchestra of the Vienna State Opera	Sena Jurinac; Lucretia West; Hans Löffler; Frederick Guthrie	Westminster	1958	
Jascha Horenstein Wiener Singverein Vienna Symphony	Wilma Lipp; Elisabeth Höngen; Murray Dickie; Ludwig Weber	Vox	1961	
Karl Richter Münchener Bach-Chor Münchener Bach-Orchester	Maria Stader; Hertha Töpper; John van Kesteren; Karl-Christian Kohn	Teldec	1961	
Herbert von Karajan Wiener Singverein Berlin Philharmonic	Wilma Lipp; Hilde Rössel-Majdan; Anton Dermota; Walter Berry	Deutsche Grammophon	1962	
Erich Leinsdorf Chorus pro Musica, Harvard Glee Club, Radcliffe Choral Society, New England Conservatory Chorus, Saint John's Seminary (Massachusetts) Choir Boston Symphony Orchestra	Saramae Endich; Eunice Alberts; Nicholas Di Virgilio; Mac Morgan	RCA Victor Red Seal	1964	
Roland Bader Bach Chor, Böblingen Stuttgarter Philharmoniker	Ursula Buckel; Margarethe Bence; Hans Ulrich Mielsch; Eduard Wollitz	Vox	1964	
István Kertész Vienna State Opera Chorus Vienna Philharmonic	Elly Ameling; Marilyn Horne; Ugo Benelli; Tugomir Franc	Decca	1966	
Wolfgang Gönnenwein Südwestdeutscher Madrigalchor Consortium Musicum	Teresa Żylis-Gara; Oralia Domínguez; Peter Schreier; Franz Crass	EMI	1966	
Colin Davis John Alldis Choir BBC Symphony Orchestra	Helen Donath; Yvonne Minton; Ryland Davies; Gerd Nienstedt	Philips	1967	
Rafael Frühbeck de Burgos New Philharmonia Chorus New Philharmonia Orchestra	Edith Mathis; Grace Bumbry; George Shirley; Marius Rintzler	EMI	1968	
Karl Böhm Vienna State Opera Chorus Wiener Symphoniker	Gundula Janowitz; Christa Ludwig; Peter Schreier; Walter Berry	Deutsche Grammophon (DVD)	1971	
Benjamin Britten Aldeburgh Festival Chorus English Chamber Orchestra	Heather Harper; Alfreda Hodgson; Peter Pears; John Shirley-Quirk	BBC	1971	
Karl Böhm Vienna State Opera Chorus Vienna Philharmonic	Edith Mathis; Julia Hamari; Wiesław Ochman; Karl Ridderbusch	Deutsche Grammophon	1971	
Daniel Barenboim John Alldis Choir English Chamber Orchestra	Sheila Armstrong; Janet Baker; Nicolai Gedda; Dietrich Fischer-Dieskau	EMI	1972	
Gerhard Schmidt-Gaden Tölzer Knabenchor Collegium Aureum	Hans Buchhierl; Mario Krämer; Werner Krenn; Barry McDaniel	Deutsche Harmonia Mundi	1974	
Herbert von Karajan Wiener Singverein Berlin Philharmonic	Anna Tomowa-Sintow; Agnes Baltsa; Werner Krenn; José van Dam	Deutsche Grammophon	1975	
Hans Gillesberger Vienna Boys' Choir, Vienna State Opera Men's Chorus Orchestra of the Vienna State Opera	Soprano soloist from the Vienna Boys' Choir; Alto soloist from the Vienna Boys' Choir; Kurt Equiluz; Gerhard Eder	RCA	1976	
Michel Corboz Coro Gulbenkian Gulbenkian Orchestra	Elly Ameling; Barbara Scherler; Louis Devos; Roger Soyer	Erato	1977	
Neville Marriner Academy of St Martin in the Fields	Ileana Cotrubaș; Helen Watts; Robert Tear; John Shirley-Quirk	Decca	1977	
Carlo Maria Giulini Philharmonia Chorus Philharmonia Orchestra	Helen Donath; Christa Ludwig; Robert Tear; Robert Lloyd	EMI	1979	
Helmuth Rilling Gächinger Kantorei Bach-Collegium Stuttgart	Arleen Auger; Carolyn Watkinson; Siegfried Jerusalem; Siegmund Nimsgern	CBS	1979	
Nikolaus Harnoncourt Vienna State Opera Chorus Concentus Musicus Wien	Rachel Yakar; Ortrun Wenkel; Kurt Equiluz; Robert Holl	Teldec	1982	Period
Peter Schreier Leipzig Radio Chorus Staatskapelle Dresden	Margaret Price; Trudeliese Schmidt; Francisco Araiza; Theo Adam	Philips	1983	
Sir Colin Davis Bavarian Radio Chorus Bavarian Radio Symphony Orchestra	Edith Mathis; Trudeliese Schmidt; Peter Schreier; Gwynne Howell	Arthaus (DVD)	1984	
Christopher Hogwood Academy of Ancient Music English Baroque Soloists	Emma Kirkby; Carolyn Watkinson; Anthony Rolfe Johnson; David Thomas	L'Oiseau-lyre	1984	Period
Daniel Barenboim Choeur de Paris Orchestre de Paris	Kathleen Battle; Ann Murray; David Rendall; Matti Salminen	EMI	1986	
Robert Shaw Atlanta Symphony Chorus Atlanta Symphony Orchestra	Arleen Auger; Delores Ziegler; Jerry Hadley; Tom Krause	Telarc	1986	
John Eliot Gardiner Monteverdi Choir English Baroque Soloists	Barbara Bonney; Anne Sofie von Otter; Hans Peter Blochwitz; Willard White	Philips	1987	Period
Herbert von Karajan Wiener Singverein Vienna Philharmonic	Anna Tomowa-Sintow; Helga Müller-Molinari; Vinson Cole; Paata Burchuladze	Deutsche Grammophon	1987	
Riccardo Muti Swedish Radio Choir, Stockholm Chamber Choir Berlin Philharmonic	Patrizia Pace; Waltraud Meier; Frank Lopardo; James Morris	EMI	1987	
Leonard Bernstein Bavarian Radio Chorus Bavarian Radio Symphony Orchestra	Marie McLaughlin; Maria Ewing; Jerry Hadley; Cornelius Hauptmann	Deutsche Grammophon	1989	
Carlo Maria Giulini Philharmonia Chorus Philharmonia Orchestra	Lynne Dawson; Jard van Nes; Keith Lewis; Simon Estes	SONY	1989	
Ton Koopman Choir of the Dutch Bach Association Amsterdam Baroque Orchestra	Barbara Schlick; Carolyn Watkinson; Christoph Pregardien; Harry van der Kamp	ERATO	1990	
Georg Solti Vienna State Opera Chorus Vienna Philharmonic	Arleen Auger; Cecilia Bartoli; Vinson Cole; René Pape	Decca	1991	
Colin Davis Bavarian Radio Chorus Bavarian Radio Symphony Orchestra	Angela Maria Blasi; Marjana Lipovšek; Uwe Heilmann; Jan-Hendrik Rootering	RCA	1991	
Gary Bertini Kölner Rundfunk Chor Kölner Rundfunk Sinfonie Orchester	Krisztina Laki; Doris Soffel; Robert Swensen; Thomas Quasthoff	Phoenix	1991	
Roger Norrington Schütz Choir of London London Classical Players	Nancy Argenta; Catherine Robbin; John Mark Ainsley; Alastair Miles	EMI	1992	
William Christie Les Arts Florissants	Anna Maria Panzarella; Nathalie Stutzmann; Christoph Prégardien; Nathan Berg	Erato	1995	Period
Philippe Herreweghe La Chapelle Royale Orchestre des Champs-Élysées	Sibylla Rubens; Annette Markert; Ian Bostridge; Hanno Müller-Brachmann	Harmonia Mundi France	1997	Period
Sigiswald Kuijken Nederlands Kamerkoor La Petite Bande	Ingrid Schmithüsen; Catherine Patriasz; Neil Mackie; Matthias Hölle	ACCENT	1997	Period
Jordi Savall La Capella Reial de Catalunya Le Concert des Nations	Montserrat Figueras; Claudia Schubert; Gerd Türk; Stephan Schreckenberger	Alia Vox	1998	Period
Claudio Abbado Swedish Radio Choir Berlin Philharmonic	Karita Mattila; Sara Mingardo; Michael Schade; Bryn Terfel	Deutsche Grammophon	1999	

== Other recordings ==
- Ralf Otto, Bachchor Mainz (Levin completion), L'arpa festante München, Julia Kleiter, Gerhild Romberger, Daniel Sans, Klaus Mertens, NCA
- Christoph Spering, Chorus Musicus, Das Neue Orchester, Iride Martinez, Monica Groop, Steve Davislim, Kwangchul Youn, Opus 111 (2002)
- Nikolaus Harnoncourt, Arnold Schoenberg Chor, Concentus Musicus Wien, Christine Schäfer, Bernarda Fink, Kurt Streit, Gerald Finley, Deutsche Harmonia Mundi
- Carl Czerny transcription for soli, coro and piano four hands: Antonio Greco, Coro Costanzo Porta, Diego Maccagnola, Anna Bessi, Silvia Frigato, Raffaele Giordani, Riccardo Demini. Discantica (2012)
- John Butt conducting the Dunedin Consort on the Linn Records label. The first recording to use David Black's new critical edition of the Süssmayr version, it attempts to reconstruct the performing forces at the first performances in Vienna in 1791 and 1793. It won the 2014 Gramophone Award for Best Choral Recording.
- Zdeněk Košler conducting the Slovak Philharmonic Orchestra and Chorus, with Magdaléna Hajóssyová, Jaroslava Horská, Jozef Kundlák and Peter Mikuláš, Naxos, 1989: recorded at the Reduta, Bratislava, March 1985.
