= Christmas Oratorio (disambiguation) =

Christmas Oratorio is an oratorio by Bach.

Christmas Oratorio may also refer to:

- Christmas oratorio, an oratorio written for Christmas or the Christmas season
- Oratorio de Noël, an 1858 oratorio by Camille Saint-Saëns
- The Christmas Oratorio, a 1983 novel by Göran Tunström
  - Christmas Oratorio (film), a 1996 film version
- Christmas Oratorio (MacMillan), a 2019 oratorio by James MacMillan

== See also ==
- List of oratorios
