= Daniel Sans =

German tenor (born 1975)

Daniel Sans (born 1975) is a German tenor.

== Career ==
Daniel Sans was a boy soprano in the choir of the Mainz Cathedral. He studied at the Musikhochschule Frankfurt. He specialized in oratorio and lied.

Sans has performed in the Wiener Konzerthaus with Michael Schneider, the Teatro Colon with Karl-Friedrich Beringer, at the Feldkirch Festival with Thomas Hengelbrock, the Kölner Philharmonie with Peter Neumann, the Berliner Philharmonie with Hans-Christoph Rademann, the Dresdner Kreuzkirche with Roderich Kreile, the Leipziger Thomaskirche with Gotthold Schwarz, and the Alte Oper in Frankfurt with Ralf Otto. In 2009 he performed Mendelssohn's Paulus with the Landesjugendorchester (State Youth Orchestra) of NRW.

Sans has collaborated with the Bachchor Mainz, conducted by Ralf Otto. He has appeared with local choirs of the Rhein Main area; for example, in 1999 he appeared with Christof Fischesser in Puccini's Messa di Gloria, both in St. Martin, Idstein and the Basilika of Schloss Johannisberg. In 2001 he sang there the tenor part in Britten's The Company of Heaven for speaker, soloists, choir and orchestra (1937), which the composer had written for Peter Pears. In 2009 he was the tenor soloist (Uriel) in Haydn's Die Schöpfung with Elisabeth Scholl (Gabriel, Eve), Andreas Pruys (Raphael, Adam) and the Neue Rheingauer Kantorei in the Rheingauer Dom in Geisenheim and in the Basilika of Schloss Johannisberg.

Sans recorded with Nicol Matt the masses of Mozart and Bruckner's Mass in D minor. He recorded the Levin completion of Mozart's Requiem with the Bachchor Mainz, L'arpa festante München, Julia Kleiter, Gerhild Romberger, and Klaus Mertens, conducted by Ralf Otto, Schubert's Mass in E-flat major with Matthias Breitschaft, and Mendelssohn's Elias with Ronen Borshevsky. Again with Matt, he recorded in 2002 the complete choral works of Mendelssohn, and in 2006, Mahler's Das Lied von der Erde and Mozart's Der Schauspieldirektor.

== Awards ==
- First prize at the Internationaler Brahms-Wettbewerb in Austria
- Förderpreis Rheinland-Pfalz.
