= Laetentur Caeli =

Laetentur Caeli may refer to:

- The final verses of the Latin version of Psalm 96
- The final verses of the Latin version of Tollite Hostias in Oratorio de Noël by Camille Saint-Saëns.
- The Bull of Union with the Greeks issued by Pope Eugene IV in 1439
- A letter from Cyril of Alexandria to John I of Antioch written in April 433 that contains the Formula of Reunion
