= Pierre Even =

Pierre Even may refer to:

- Pierre Even (composer) (born 1946), Luxembourgian composer
- Pierre Even (producer), Canadian film producer
- Pierre Even (cyclist), French cyclist participant in the 1950 UCI Track Cycling World Championships
