= Oratorio de Noël =

Cantata by Camille Saint-Saëns

- Cantata by Camille Saint-Saëns
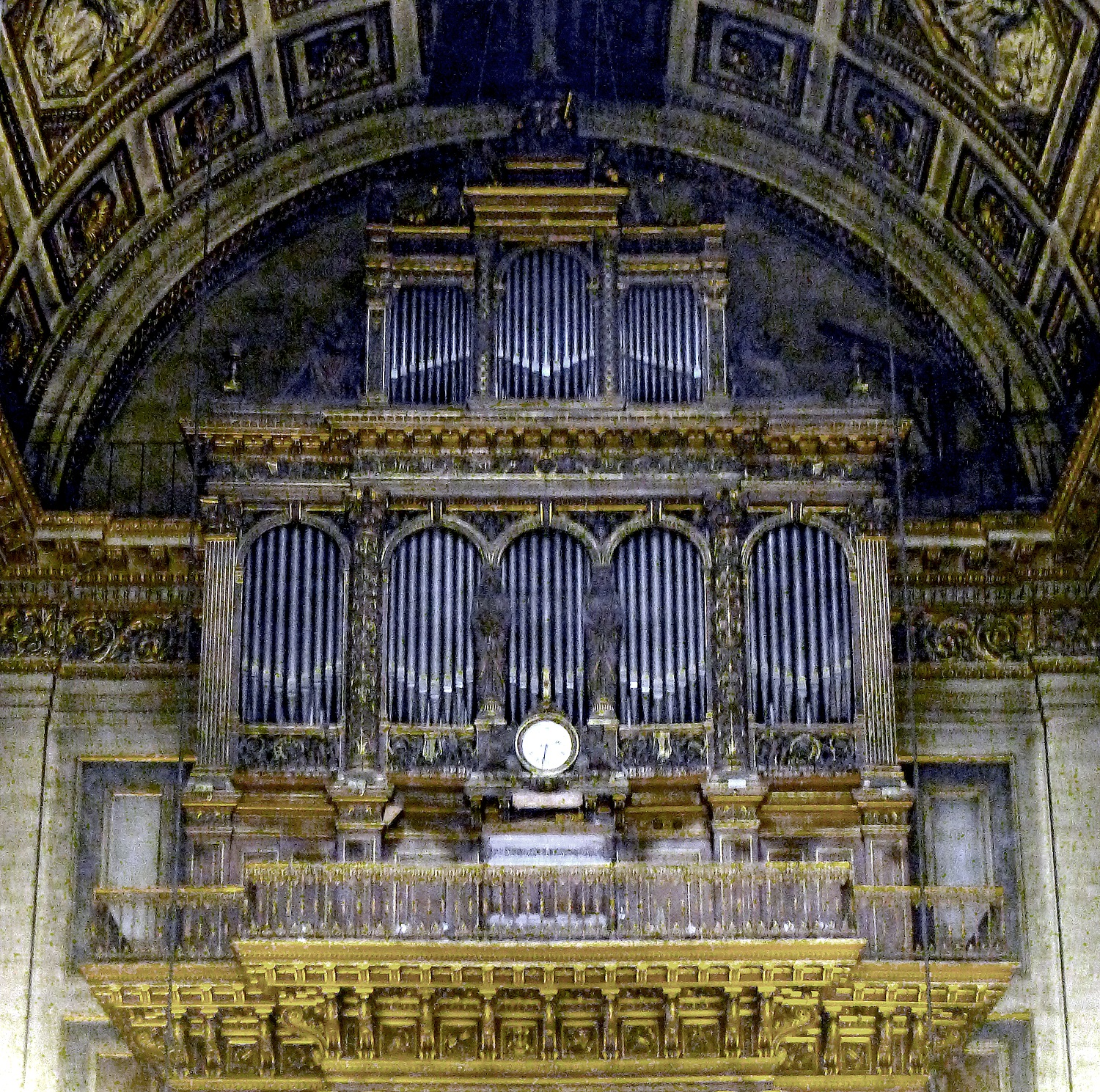
- The Aristide Cavaillé-Coll organ at La Madeleine, where the music premiered
- English: Christmas oratorio
- Opus: 12
- Text: from the Vulgate
- Language: Latin
- Performed: 24 December 1858: Paris
- Published: 1863
- Movements: 10
- Scoring: soprano; mezzo-soprano; alto; tenor; baritone; mixed chorus; organ; harp; strings

The Oratorio de Noël, Op. 12, by Camille Saint-Saëns, also known as his Christmas Oratorio, is a cantata-like work scored for soloists, chorus, organ, strings and harp. While an organist at La Madeleine, Saint-Saëns wrote the Christmas oratorio in less than a fortnight, completing it ten days before its premiere on Christmas 1858. The vocal score of this oratorio was prepared later by the composer and organist Eugene Gigout, a colleague of Saint-Saëns.

== Performing forces ==
The work is scored for five soloists (soprano, mezzo-soprano, alto, tenor, and baritone), SATB mixed chorus, organ, harp, and strings in the standard five sections. The women of the chorus divide into four parts in one movement. The organ plays a significant role in the work, often playing alone, while the harp is limited to three movements.

== Text ==
Saint-Saëns chose several verses from the Latin Vulgate Bible for the text of the work. "While these texts are not from a single source, it is clear that the traditional church liturgies surrounding Christmas influenced Saint-Saëns. About half of the texts he chose match different portions of two Christmas Offices: the First Mass at Midnight and the Second Mass at Dawn." One author calls the work "a musical enhancement of the words of the [Christmas] Office, without interest in the human drama."

The narrative portion of the text, taken from the second chapter of St. Luke, appears in the second movement and tells the part of the traditional Christmas story involving the shepherds. The remainder of the texts, taken from John, Isaiah, Lamentations, and the Psalms, reflect upon the meaning and significance of the event.

== Structure and style ==
Les Petits Chanteurs de Passy sing Tollite Hostias from the Oratorio de Noël

The Oratorio de Noël is structured in a way that "hardly exceeds the limits of a cantata, but musically is constructed in oratorio style." However, "its shorter length and the fact that it was intended for presentation during a worship service place it closer in character and purpose to a traditional sacred cantata." Its structure bears a greater resemblance to oratorios of the early Baroque than to later works of that genre.

Saint-Saëns divided the work into 10 movements, a prelude followed by nine vocal numbers. After the prelude, opening recitatives and chorus, the work gradually builds from a single soloist accompanied by a small ensemble to involve the entire instrumental and vocal forces. The full chorus sings in the second, sixth, and final movements and the women of the chorus accompany the tenor soloist in the fourth.

While there are brief episodes of grandeur in the solo parts and one frenetic section for the chorus, most of the work is subdued and lyrical in character. Saint-Saëns's study of the choral music of Bach, Handel, Mozart, Berlioz, and others had a great influence on the work, with the most significant influences being Part II of J. S. Bach's Christmas Oratorio and Gounod's St. Cecilia Mass.

== Movements ==
There are ten movements:

1. Prélude (dans le style de Seb. Bach), for organ and strings
2. Recitative: “Et pastores erant”, for Soprano, Alto, Tenor and Baritone soloists, organ and strings; Chorus: "Gloria in altissimis," for mixed chorus, organ and strings
3. Air: "Exspectans expectavi," for Mezzo-soprano soloist, organ and strings
4. Air and chorus: “Domine, ego credidi,” for Tenor soloist, women's chorus, organ and strings
5. Duet: “Benedictus,” for Soprano and Baritone soloists, organ and harp
6. Chorus: “Quare fremuerunt gentes,” mixed chorus, organ and strings
7. Trio: “Tecum principium,” for Soprano, Tenor, and Baritone soloists, organ and harp
8. Quartet: “Laudate coeli,” for Soprano, Mezzo-soprano, Alto, and Baritone soloists, organ and strings
9. Quintet and chorus: “Consurge, filia Sion,” for all five soloists, chorus, organ, strings, and harp
10. Chorus: “Tollite hostias,” for mixed chorus, organ and strings

== Recordings ==
Conductor	Soloists	Choir and orchestra	Organ	Harp	date	Label
Diethard Hellmann	Verena Schweizer, Soprano; Edith Wiens, Soprano; Helena Jungwirth, Alto; Friederich Melzer, Ténor; Kurt Widmer, Bass	Bachchor & Bachcorchester Mainz	Hans-Joachim Bartsch	Barbara Biermann	1976	Calig report Profil (Édition Günter Hänssler) 2005
Sylvain Cambreling	Michèle Lagrange, Soprano; Annie Tasset, Mezzo-soprano; Georges Gauthier, Ténor; Hanna Schaer, Contralto; Paul Guigue, Baryton	Le Madrigal de Lyon; Orchestre de Chambre de Lyon	Paul Coueffé	Germaine Lorenzini	1981	Arion; Grand Prix de l'Académie du Disque Lyrique
Anders Eby	Anne Sophie von Otter, Mezzo-soprano; Britt-Marie Aruhn, Soprano; Erland Hagegård, Ténor; Ulf Lundmark, Bass; Ing-Mari Landin, Alto	Royal Opera Theater Orchestra; Mikaeli Chamber Choir	Lars Hagström	Karin Langebo	1981	Proprius Musik AB; 1994
Piet Kiel Jr	Marja Pool, Alto; Arthur Schildmeyer, Bass; Hélène Verslot, Mezzo-soprano; Wendela Bronsgeet, Soprano; Jos Van Der Lans, Ténor	L'Estro Armonico	Piet Halsema	Frieda Kahn	1983	Larigot
Martin Flämig	Elisabeth Wilke; Armin Ude; Egbert Junghanns; Annette Market; Juta Zoff; Ute Selbig	Dresdner Kreuzchor; Dresdner Philarmonie	Michael-Christfried Winkler		1987	Capriccio
Jean-Louis Petit	Claire Louchet, Soprano; Marie-Madelein Lauvin, Mezzo-soprano; Danielle Michel, Alto; Hervé Lamy, Ténor; Marc Thoron, Bass	Ensemble Polyphonique de Versailles; Ensemble instrumental de Ville d'Avray	Jean-Michel Louchart		1993	REM
Michael Weber	Hendrik Ritter, Ténor; Steffen-Friedl-Schneider, Baritone; Traudl Well, Soprano; Andrea Forscher, Mezzo-soprano; Ulla Teich, Alto	Cor der Evangelischen Gemeinde Hemsbach/sulzbach; Lukas Kamerata Mannheim	Andreas Well		10/12/1995	SFS
Alexandros Myrat	Julia Souglakou; Marina Fideli, mezzo-soprano Marina Ferreira; Vanghelis Hatzisimos, tenor Christoforos Stabogli, bass	Greek Radio and Television Choir La Camerata	Martin Haselböck	Ion Ivan-Roncea	1997	DOM
Sven-Ingvart Mikkelsen	Tinebeth Hartkopf, Soprano; Bolette Bruno Hansen et Lilly Schulz, Mezzo-soprano; June Lund, Ténor; Lars Fentz Krogh, Bass	Logumkloster Vokal Ensemble	Bent Sorensen	Joost Schelling	1998	CD Scandinavian Classics
Jörg-Hannes Hahn	Anna Maria Friman, Soprano; Aleksandra Lustig, Mezzo-soprano; Patricia Wagner, Alto; Andreas Wagner, Tenor; Tobias Schabel, Bass	Cantus Stuttgart; Bachchor Stuttgart; Bachorchester Stuttgart	Peter Kranfoed Rie Hiroe-Lang		2005	Cantate
Holger Speck	Antonia Bourvé, Soprano; Gundula Schneider, Mezzo-soprano; Sabine Czinczel, Alto; Marcus Ullman, Ténor; Jens Hamann, Baritone	Vocalensemble Rastatt; Les Favorites	Romano Giefer		2006	Carus
Ralf Otto	Simona Houda-Šaturová, soprano Regina Pätzer, mezzo-soprano Anke Vondung, alto Hans Jörg Mammel, tenor Florian Boesch, baritone	Bachchor Mainz L'arpa festante	Petra Morath-Pusinelli	Françoise Friedrich	2008	Deutsche Harmonia Mundi
Tim Keyes	Justin Connors, Ténor; Victoria Lotkowictz, Mezzo-soprano; Gary Gavula, Baritone; Elisa Rush, Soprano	The Keyes Consort			2008	ALLMUSIC PLAY VOD
Roberto Molinelli		Orchestra da Camera delle Marche; Coro Colombati Città di Pergola			2009	You Tube TheRMstaff
Christoph Poppen	Ruth Ziesak, Soprano; Anja Schlosser, Mezzo-soprano; Claudia Mahnke, Mezzo-soprano; James Taylor, Ténor; Nikolai Borchev, Baritone	Saarbrücken, Chor & Orchestra			2008	DVD 16222

== Literature ==
- Music, David W. (1998). "Camille Saint-Saëns's Christmas Oratorio: Description, Accessibility, Comparison". The Choral Journal. 39 (5). American Choral Directors Association: 49–53. ISSN 0009-5028. JSTOR 23552680.
- Barrow, Lee G. (2014). Camille Saint-Saëns, Christmas Oratorio. BarGraphica. ISBN 978-1-4973-9389-9.
