= L'arpa festante =

Baroque chamber orchestra based in Munich

- Baroque chamber orchestra on period instruments
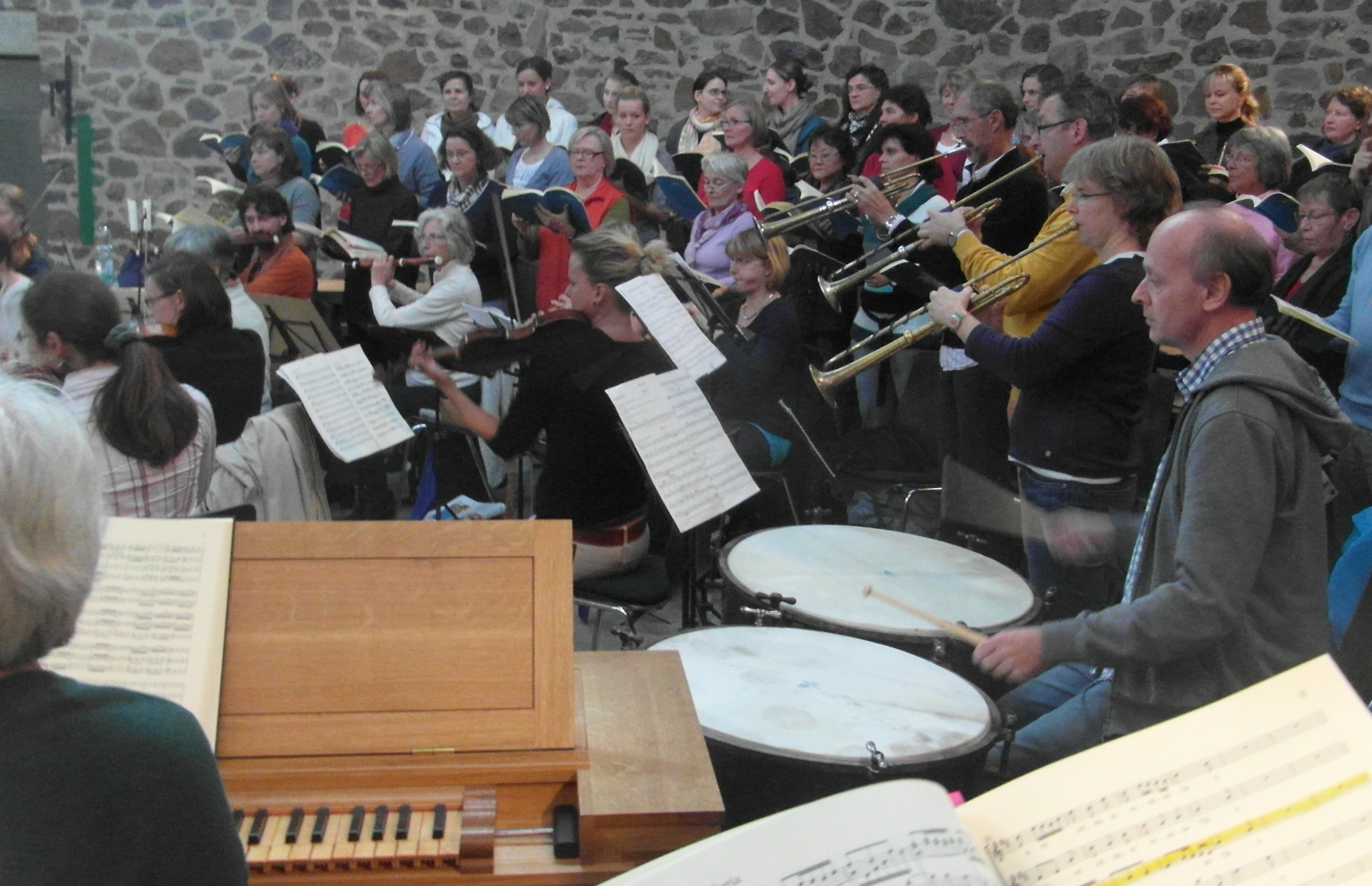
- Rehearsal of Bach's Mass in B minor in St. Martin, Idstein
- Founded: 1983 by concertmaster Michi Gaigg
- Location: Munich

L'arpa festante is a German chamber orchestra, specializing in the revival and performance of unknown works, especially from the Baroque era. It was established in Munich in 1983 by Michi Gaigg, who also led the ensemble as concertmaster until 1995. The ensemble takes its name from Giovanni Battista Maccioni's dramatic cantata L'arpa festante (The Festive Harp) which was first performed in 1653, inaugurating what was to become the Bavarian State Opera.

L'arpa festante plays in varying ensembles of up to 40 players, often with choirs and soloists. Early music is played on period instruments in historically informed performances. The orchestra's focus is on revivals of less-known works of the Baroque in Southern Germany, music by members of the Bach family, and oratorios of the Baroque and Classical periods.

The orchestra played Bach's Mass in B minor with the Frankfurter Kantorei, conducted by Winfried Toll. They performed the work at the Cathedral of Trier with the cathedral choir, when Domkapellmeister Stephan Rommelspacher left after 13 years for a new position in Leipzig, and in St. Martin, Idstein.

== Recordings ==
The orchestra has recorded rarely performed music, some for the first time. Examples include Vêpres aux Jésuites by Marc-Antoine Charpentier recorded in 1993, with Michel Corboz as conductor, six symphonies by Georg Matthias Monn recorded in 1996, and cello concertos and symphonies (Cello-Konzerte und Sinfonien) by Christian Ernst Graf and Carl Friedrich Abel in 2010. They also have participated in the recording of vocal works. In 2003 they recorded Telemann's Passion Das selige Erwägen des bittern Leiden und Sterbens Jesu Christi with the Freiburger Vokalensemble, conducted by Wolfgang Schäfer, then probably the only recording of the work. A review noted: "The orchestra ... playing on original instruments, relish all of Telemann's varied orchestration and the wind players in particular contribute some fine solos." In 2006 they recorded Bach's Christmas Oratorio and a first recording of Pythagorische Schmids-Fuencklein (1692) by Rupert Ignaz Mayr in 2006. They recorded his Confitebor Tibi in 2008.

For the publisher Carus-Verlag they produced a first recording of eleven sacred vocal works by Johann Philipp Förtsch, titled Ich freue mich im Herrn, and in 2004 of works by David Pohle, titled Wie der Hirsch schreyet: Diligam te Domine; In te Domine speravi; Benedicam Dominum; Jesu chare; Paratum cor meum., conducted by Rien Voskuilen.

On the Leipzig label GENUIN, they released two recordings of works by Dietrich Buxtehude with Stephan Schreckenberger and Musica Lingua: Festive Cantatas (2002, ) and Membra Jesu Nostri (2005, ).

They recorded Carl Heinrich Graun's Te Deum and motets with the Basel Madrigalists, conducted by Fritz Näf. In 2006 they recorded a historically informed performance of Mozart's Requiem with the Bachchor Mainz conducted by Ralf Otto, with soloists Julia Kleiter, Gerhild Romberger, Daniel Sans and Klaus Mertens which was broadcast by Hessischer Rundfunk in a documentary on the work on 28 April 2006. With the same choir and conductor they began in 2010 a recording of cantatas by Wilhelm Friedemann Bach. They recorded music by Giovanni Battista Martini, Te Deum – Magnificat – Introitus – Concerti in 2010. The same year they ventured into historically informed performances of Romantic music with Rheinberger's Cantus Missae and Bruckner's Mass in E minor.

They recorded violin concertos by Francesco Maria Cattaneo and anonymous music from the Dresden court library with soloist Anton Sterck in 2019. A reviewer described the group as "an excellent ensemble, playing with taste and a feel of joie de vivre, the string sound enhanced by a crisp harpsichord or gentle lute, depending on the mood in any particular movement." In 2020 they recorded sacred music composed in Germany in the late 17th century, selected by counter-tenor David Erler for his first solo album. A reviewer summarised: "His singing and the way he treats the text do full justice to what this music is about, both musically and spiritually. L'arpa festante is his perfect partner, as the instrumentalists are also very aware of the texts and their meaning."

In a world premiere recording, the ensemble led by Florian Heyerick recorded the complete cantatas for tenor by Christoph Graupner (1683–1760) with the soloist Georg Poplutz. The recording highlights a rare aspect of Graupner's sacred output, as solo tenor cantatas constitute only six works among his nearly 1,450 surviving church cantatas.
