= Harmoniemesse =

Mass by Joseph Haydn

- Mass by Joseph Haydn
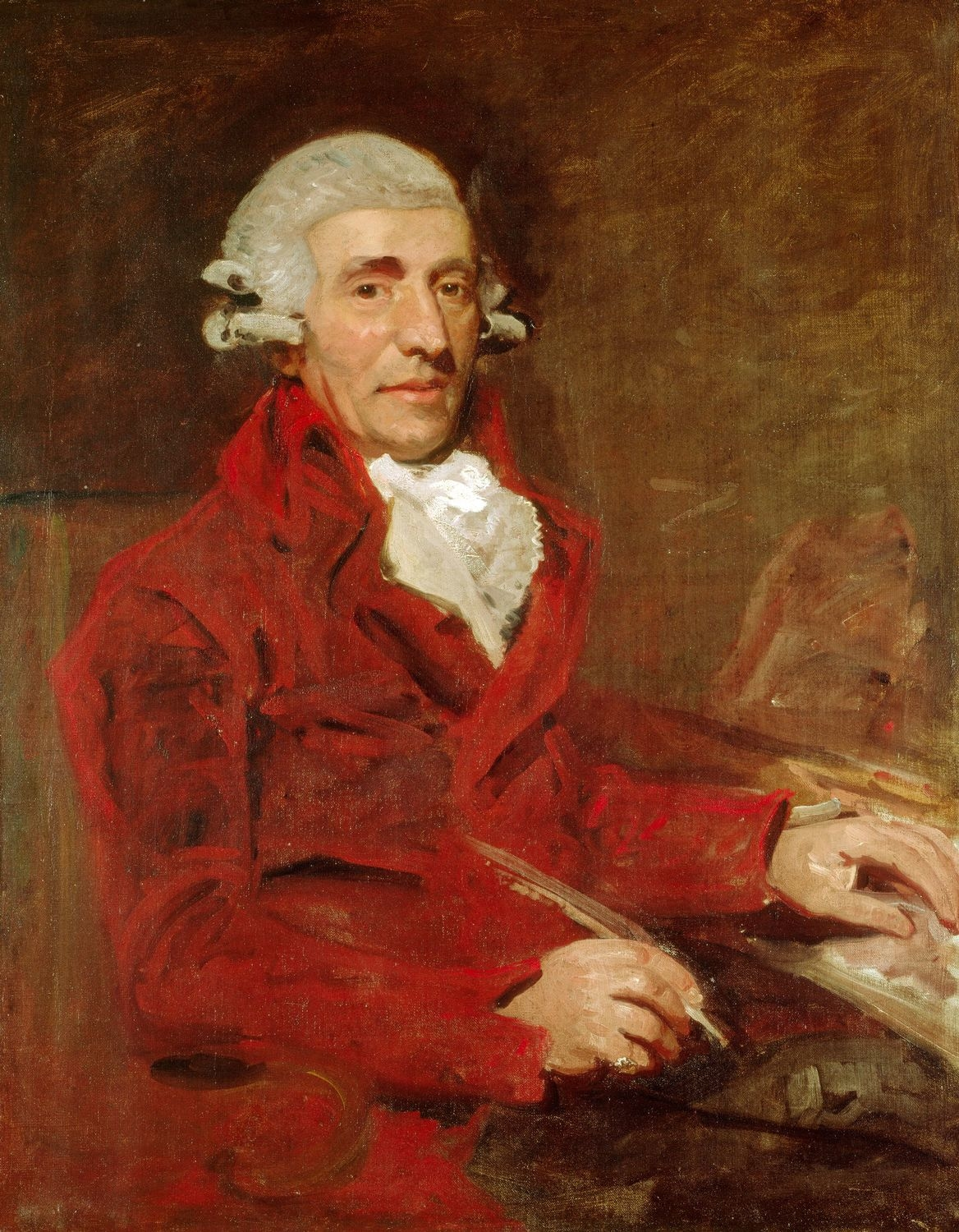
- Haydn as portrayed by John Hoppner in England in 1791
- Key: B♭ major
- Catalogue: Hob. XXII/14
- Composed: 1802
- Movements: 6
- Vocal: SATB choir and soloists
- Instrumental: Orchestra

The Harmoniemesse is a mass in B♭ major by Joseph Haydn, Hob. XXII:14, Novello 6, was written in 1802. It was Haydn's last major work. It is because of the prominence of the winds in this mass and "the German terminology for a kind of wind ensemble, Harmonie," that this mass setting is called "Harmoniemesse" or "Wind Band Mass". Besides flute, 2 oboes, 2 clarinets, 2 bassoons, 2 horns in B♭, 2 trumpets in B♭, the mass also calls for choir, timpani, strings, and organ, the latter supplying figured bass for most of the duration.

The setting is divided into six movements.

1. Kyrie Poco adagio, B♭ major, 3/4
2. Gloria Vivace assai, B♭ major, common time
  "Gratias agimus" Allegretto, E♭ major, 3/8
  "Quoniam tu solus sanctus" Allegro spiritoso, common time, B♭ major
3. Credo Vivace, B♭ major, common time
  "Et incarnatus est" Adagio, E♭ major, 3/4
  "Et resurrexit" Vivace, B♭ major, common time
  "Et vitam venturi" Vivace, 6/8
4. Sanctus Adagio, B♭ major, 3/4
  "Pleni sunt coeli..." Allegro, 3/4
5. Benedictus Molto allegro, F major, common time
  "Osanna" 3/4, B♭ major
6. Agnus Dei Adagio, G major, 3/4
  "Dona nobis pacem" Allegro con spirito, B♭ major, cut time

The Kyrie has "the most striking 'introductory' shock in Haydn's late vocal music ... a rather long orchestral introduction ... [with] unceasing contrasts between soft and loud, and the unexpected entry of G♭, the flat submediant, in the fifth bar." The Agnus Dei makes reference both to the Adagio of Symphony No. 98 and to Mozart's Coronation Mass.

The Harmoniemesse was performed at St. Peter's Basilica in the Vatican City for the Mass of the Solemnity of Pentecost on 31 May 2009, which coincided with the 200th anniversary of Haydn's death.

== Recordings ==
Soloists	Chorus and Orchestra	Conductor	Label	Year
Wilma Lipp, Margarita Kenney, Waldemar Kmentt, Keith Engen	Chor und Orchester der Wiener Staatsoper	Jonathan Sternberg	Nixa	1956
Erna Spoorenberg, Helen Watts, Alexander Young, Joseph Rouleau	Choir Of St. John's College, Cambridge, Academy of St. Martin in the Fields	George Guest	Decca	1966
Judith Blegen, Frederica von Stade, Kenneth Riegel, Simon Estes	Westminster Choir, New York Philharmonic	Leonard Bernstein	Sony	1973
Barbara Martig-Tüller, Ria Bollen, Adalbert Kraus, Kurt Widmer	Bachchor Mainz, Sinfonieorchester des Südwestfunks	Diethard Hellmann	Calig	1981
Joanne Lunn, Sara Mingardo, Topi Lehtipuu, Brindley Sherratt	Monteverdi Choir, English Baroque Soloists	John Eliot Gardiner	Philips	2001
Mireille Asselin, Catherine Wyn-Rogers, Jermy Budd, Sumner Thompson,	Handel and Haydn Society	Harry Christophers	CORO	2019

== See also ==
Die Schöpfung & Harmoniemesse (Leonard Bernstein recording)
