= Judith Raskin =

American opera singer

Judith Raskin (June 21, 1928 – December 21, 1984) was an American lyric soprano, renowned for her fine voice as well as her acting.

== Life and work ==
Raskin was born in New York to Harry A. Raskin, a high school music teacher, and Lillian Raskin, a grade school teacher. Her father aroused her childhood interest in music, leading her to study violin and piano, before she turned her focus to singing. In 1945, she graduated from Roosevelt High School, Yonkers and attended Smith College, where she majored in music. It was during her college years that she began taking singing lessons, which she continued after graduation in order to develop further the warmth and artistry of her voice.

In 1948, she married Dr. Raymond A. Raskin, with whom she had two children, Jonathan and Lisa.

Winning the Marian Anderson award in 1952 and 1953, and the Musicians Club of New York's Young Artist Award in 1956, Raskin started to perform in concerts throughout the United States. She secured national recognition in 1957 for her part as Sister Constance in the televised American premiere of Poulenc's Dialogues des Carmélites. Her prominence continued to rise in July the same year when she starred in a concert version of Puccini's La bohème, with the Symphony of the Air in Central Park. Finally, in 1959, she joined the New York City Opera (NYCO), debuting as Despina in Mozart's Così fan tutte.

Her next spectacular performance was the title role of Douglas Moore's The Ballad of Baby Doe for the New York City Opera in 1960. She also sang Baby Doe in Central City Colorado where the opera had premiered. Two years later, she made her crowning debut in 1962 at the Metropolitan Opera, as Susanna in Mozart's The Marriage of Figaro. It is with Mozart that she became most closely associated. Reviewing the debut Raymond Ericsson wrote “ Pretty as a picture, never forcing her musical phrases or overplaying the comedy, enunciating the Italian like a veteran, Miss Raskin was as appealing a Susanna as the Met could wish for.”

During her career at the Met she also performed as Zerlina in Don Giovanni, and she had the distinction of performing at the new Met as Pamina in the memorable Marc Chagall-designed performance of The Magic Flute. In reviewing the recordings of the CDs produced for the Metropolitan Opera's 50th year celebration of the new opera house, Dewey Faulkner wrote that hearing the broadcast of Judith Raskin's Pamina “makes one love her all over again.”

Raskin appeared on the NBC television opera as the bride in Menotti's Labyrinth, an opera that was never intended to be performed on stage. Although Harold Schonberg of The New York Times was critical of the opera, he praised the singers, including John Reardon and Judith Raskin. Other roles performed at the Met included Micaela in Carmen, Nanetta in Falstaff, Marzeline in Fidelio and Sophie in Der Rosenkavalier. Raskin performed Pamina in The Magic Flute for two summer seasons at the Glyndebourne Festival. She also sang at the Chicago Lyric Opera and the San Francisco Opera Company.

In 1969, Raskin performed in Boston for the Peabody Mason Concert series. During the rest of her career, she would specialize in lyrical roles written not only by Mozart but also by Richard Strauss. She was chosen by George Szell to be the “first desk soprano” of the Cleveland Orchestra; with the maestro she recorded Mahler's Fourth Symphony, a highly rated recording that was reissued in the CBS Great Performances series. The album was nominated for the Best Classical Solo Vocal Album at the 9th Annual Grammy Awards in 1967. With Szell she also recorded Mozart's Exsultate, jubilate. She was chosen by Igor Stravinsky to be the Anne Trulove in a studio recording of his opera, The Rake's Progress, that was conducted by Stravinsky himself. Raskin's discography is extensive, having recorded for Decca, Columbia/CBS, Sony and RCA. In addition to her 1967 nomination, she was nominated as Best New Classical Artist at the 1965 ceremony, losing to American mezzo-soprano Marilyn Horne, for her recording of Bach's cantata Jauchzet Gott in Allen Landen, BWV 51. Despite having nominations, Raskin won the award for Best Opera Recording at the 11th Annual Grammy Awards for her role as Despina in Mozart's Così fan tutte (alongside cast members Leontyne Price, Tatiana Troyanos, George Shirley, Sherrill Milnes and Ezio Flagello, with conductor Erich Leinsdorf directing the New Philharmonia Orchestra and producer Richard Mohr for RCA).

Raskin also served on many music advisory boards, as well as in the Young Concert Artists, the National Opera Institute and the National Endowment for the Arts. One of her main concerns was the need to establish more opera companies in American cities to provide practical experience to "well trained American singers with no place to go", since "the only way to become professional is to perform." She moved gracefully from the large opera stage to the intimate settings of recitals. She was well known for her concerts in, and recordings of, Lieder. Beginning her recital work in 1964 after receiving the Ford Foundation grant, she continued to concertize in many venues. She performed the works of contemporary composers Miriam Gideon and Ezra Laderman at Carnegie Hall in 1977; Harold Schonberg of The New York Times wrote that she “honor[ed] to the music.” She sang at the Cleveland Chamber Music Society, a performance of which Robert Finn in The Plain Dealer wrote in 1967 "...when it comes to the total package of voice, musicianship, personality projection and so on, I cannot think of any recitalist who is her superior." While her operatic singing received excellent reviews, in 1981 she commented to Edward Rothstein of The New York Times: "In my heart of hearts I have always been a recitalist. The recital is personal. I always liked the idea that I could say something directly. One person is all I need. An audience is multiples of one person."

In 1977, she was also a soloist with the Naumburg Orchestral Concerts, in the Naumburg Bandshell, Central Park, in the summer series.

As a music educator, Raskin taught at the Manhattan School of Music, and at the 92nd Street Y, where she took the role of Pearl, the rabbi's wife, in Lazar Weiner's opera The Golem in 1979.

Following a 2-year battle with ovarian cancer, Raskin died in New York in 1984. Harold Schonberg, in his New York Times obituary of Raskin, wrote “as a leading singer with the New York City Opera, and then at the Metropolitan Opera from 1962 to 1972, Miss Raskin was hailed as one of the finest artists of her time. She had a voice that critics constantly referred to as 'ravishing.’ Combined with the beauty of her sound was a high order of musicianship. In addition, Miss Raskin was a beautiful woman and an excellent actress. As a complete artist, she captivated audiences whenever she appeared.” “Many believed her to be the most attractive Adele in Strauss' Fledermaus within memory.” After her death the family began an annual concert at The Stephen Wise Free Synagogue at which a winner of the National Council awards would perform; the annual Judith Raskin Memorial Concert ran for 25 years. There are currently awards established in her name for young singers at the National Council of the Metropolitan Opera, the Manhattan School of Music and Smith College.

== Recordings ==
=== Recordings for RCA/RCA Red Seal ===
- 1960 – The Desert Song: Highlights (with Mario Lanza).
- 1961 – The Vagabond King (with Mario Lanza).
- 1966 – Handel: Messiah (with Florence Kopleff, Richard Lewis, Thomas Paul and The Robert Shaw Orchestra and Chorale, conducted by Robert Shaw)
- 1966 – Gluck: Orfeo ed Euridice (with Shirley Verrett, Anna Moffo and the Virtuosi di Roma, conducted by Renato Fasano)
- 1968 – Mozart: Così fan tutte (with Leontyne Price, Tatiana Troyanos, George Shirley, Sherrill Milnes, Ezio Flagello and the New Philharmonia Orchestra and Ambrosian Opera Chorus, conducted by Erich Leinsdorf)
- 1968 – Mozart: Der Schauspieldirektor (with Reri Grist, Richard Lewis, Sherrill Milnes, Leo McKern and the English Chamber Orchestra, conducted by André Previn; sung in English with a libretto translated and prepared by Dory Previn)

=== Recordings for Columbia/CBS ===
- 1964 – Stravinsky: The Rake's Progress (with Jean Manning, Regina Sarfaty, Alexander Young, Kevin Miller, John Reardon, Don Garrard, Peter Tracey and the Royal Philharmonic Orchestra and Sadler's Wells Opera Chorus, conducted by Igor Stravinsky)
- 1964 – Bach: Easter Oratorio (with Maureen Forrester, Richard Lewis, Herbert Beattie and the Philadelphia Orchestra and the Temple University Choirs, conducted by Eugene Ormandy)
- 1965 – Mahler: Symphony No. 4 (with the Cleveland Orchestra, conducted by George Szell)
- 1965 – Mozart: Sinfonia Concertante / Exsultate, jubilate (with instrumentalists Rafael Druian, Abraham Skernick and the Cleveland Orchestra, conducted by George Szell)

== See also ==
- Haydn: Die Schöpfung (Leonard Bernstein recording)

== Sources ==
Brody, Seymour "Sy" (1996). "Judith Raskin". Jewish Heroes & Heroines of America: 150 True Stories of American Jewish Heroism. Lifetime Books, Inc., Hollywood, FL.
