= Ralf Otto =

German conductor (born 1956)

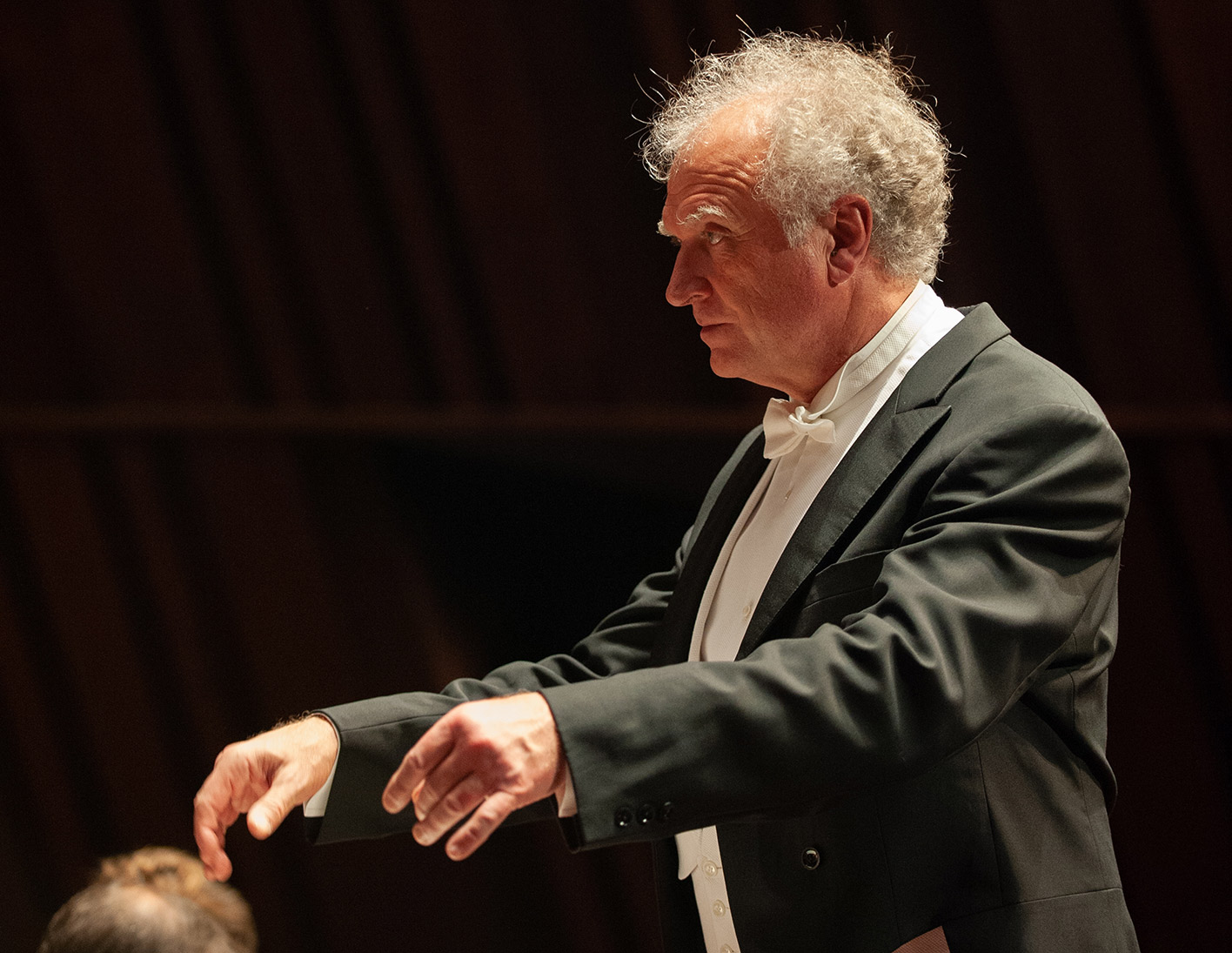
- Born: 1956 (age 68–69); Kassel, Hesse, Germany
- Education: Musikhochschule Frankfurt
- Occupations: Choral conductor; Academic teacher
- Organizations: Vokalensemble Frankfurt; Bachchor Mainz; Folkwang Hochschule; Hochschule für Musik Mainz

Ralf Otto (born 1956) is a German conductor, especially known as a choral conductor and academic teacher. He founded the Vokalensemble Frankfurt, focused on contemporary music and winning competitions including Let the Peoples Sing. Since 1986, he has been director of the Bachchor Mainz, with a tradition of performing Bach cantatas in broadcast church services. He added late romantic and contemporary works to their repertoire and made international tours with them. They made world premiere recordings of some cantatas by Bach's oldest son, Wilhelm Friedemann Bach, among other recordings. Otto was professor of choral conducting at the Folkwang Hochschule from 1990 to 2006, when he took the same position at the Hochschule für Musik Mainz.

== Life and career ==
=== Vokalensemble Frankfurt ===
Otto was born in Kassel. While still studying church music at the Musikhochschule Frankfurt, Otto founded the Vokalensemble Frankfurt in 1981. With this chamber choir, consisting of young, partly professional singers, who specialised in demanding and rarely performed works of all eras, Otto achieved international competition successes, including:

- 1984: 1st prize at the Hessian Choir Competition
- 1985: 1st prize at the Deutscher Chorwettbewerb and special prize for the best interpretation of a contemporary work (Lars Edlund's Elegi)
- 1990: 1st prize at the BBC choir competition Let the Peoples Sing

In addition to ancient music in historically informed performance, Otto has focused on contemporary music. He was a regular guest at the Frankfurt Feste with numerous premieres, presenting works by composers such as Olivier Messiaen, Klaus Huber, Iannis Xenakis, Luciano Berio, Brian Ferneyhough, Gerhard Müller-Hornbach, Wolfgang Rihm, Anton Webern and Michael Gielen. In addition, he collaborated with the Ensemble Modern and the London Sinfonietta Voices as well as with conductors Lothar Zagrosek and Gielen.

He has produced numerous radio and CD co-productions for the Hessischer Rundfunk, including in 1991 Bach's Christmas Oratorio, with Concerto Köln and soloists Ruth Ziesak, Monica Groop, Christoph Prégardien, Klaus Mertens.

=== Bachchor Mainz ===
In 1986 Otto was appointed artistic director of the Bachchor Mainz. The choir was founded by Diethard Hellmann and educated in the Leipzig Bach tradition since 1955, giving regular Bach cantata services in the Christuskirche which were broadcast. Otto added late romantic and contemporary music to their repertoire, including Schmidt's Das Buch mit sieben Siegeln, Hanns Eisler's Deutsche Sinfonie, Britten's War Requiem, Müller-Hornbach's Am Rande der Zeit and premieres by Tilo Medek. They performed Bach's Matthäus-Passion in Mendelssohn's version and Bach's Johannespassion in Schumann's version in Mainz, and sang Bach's Mass in B minor with one voice per part. He has also conducted works by composers such as Luigi Dallapiccola, Arnold Schoenberg, and Luigi Nono (La victoire de Guernica), and by contemporary composers.

Otto has conducted the ensemble in subscription concerts, in the regular cantata services, and in guest concerts abroad. Partners include the Bachorchester Mainz playing on historical instruments, the Munich Baroque orchestra L'arpa festante and the Staatsphilharmonie Rheinland-Pfalz. Tours led the choir with Otto to France, Spain, Italy, Luxembourg, Switzerland, and in the years 2003 and 2006 together with the Junge Deutsche Philharmonie on two concert tours organized by the Mozarteum Argentino to Argentina, Brazil and Uruguay.

Ralf Otto is connected with the Südwestrundfunk and various production companies by extensive recording activities:

- Mozart's Requiem in the version completed by Robert D. Levin, (Julia Kleiter, Gerhild Romberger, Daniel Sans, Klaus Mertens, L'arpa festante – NCA)
- Camille Saint-Saëns' Noel – French Christmas Music of Romanticism, (Saturova, Pätzer, Anke Vondung}, Hans Jörg Mammel, Boesch, L'arpa festante – Sony, Deutsche Harmonia Mundi)
- Wilhelm Friedemann Bach: Cantatas, (Dorothee Mields, Romberger, Poplutz, Mertens, L'arpa festante – Carus & Accentus Leipzig)

With the world premiere recordings of some cantatas by Bach's eldest son, the ensemble contributed to the beginning of the renaissance of his works. Otto also presented works by Heinrich von Herzogenberg. In 2018, they recorded Bach's St John Passion and his Christmas Oratorio with the Bachorchester Mainz. The soloists in the Passion were Georg Poplutz as the Evangelist, Yorck Speer as the vox Christi, Julia Kleiter, Gerhild Romberger, Daniel Sans and Matthias Winckler. The soloists in the Oratorio were Kleiter, Katharina Magiera, Poplutz and Thomas E. Bauer. A reviewer of the Bayerischer Rundfunk noted precise diction and a transparent sound.

=== Teaching ===
Otto was professor of choral conducting at the Folkwang Hochschule in Essen from 1990 to 2006; since then he has held the same position at the Hochschule für Musik Mainz.

=== Other commitments ===
As a guest conductor Otto also worked with orchestras such as the Staatsphilharmonie Rheinland-Pfalz, the Frankfurter Opern- und Museumsorchester, the Junge Deutsche Philharmonie, the Württemberg Chamber Orchestra Heilbronn, the Philharmonia Hungarica, the Munich Radio Orchestra, the Munich Bach Orchestra and the Polish Chamber Philharmonic. From 1998 to 2000, he was chief conductor of the Jugendsinfonieorchester of Hesse. In addition, Otto has worked regularly in the past with the Münchener Bach-Chor and with the radio choirs NDR Chor and WDR Rundfunkchor Köln, and has been invited to festivals including the Schleswig-Holstein Music Festival, the Herbstliche Musiktage Bad Urach, and the Weilburger Schlosskonzerte. He conducted performances at festivals such as Rheingau Musik Festival and Schleswig-Holstein Musik Festival, among others.

== Awards ==
Otto was awarded the Peter-Cornelius-Plakette, the highest award of Rhineland-Palatinate, in 2011. In 2016, he received the Gutenberg Medal, the highest cultural honour of Mainz.
