= Die Schöpfung & Harmoniemesse (Leonard Bernstein recording) =

- Sony CD: SM2K 47560

Studio album by Leonard Bernstein
- Released: 1992
- Studio: Avery Fisher Hall and Manhattan Center
- Genre: Classical vocal
- Length: 149:26
- Language: German and Latin
- Label: Sony Classical
- Producer: Thomas Z. Shepard and John McClure

Harmoniemesse
- CBS Masterworks LP: CBS 76410

Die Schöpfung & Harmoniemesse is a 1992, 149-minute CD issue of two studio recordings of classical vocal works by Joseph Haydn, both accompanied by the New York Philharmonic and conducted by Leonard Bernstein. The oratorio Die Schöpfung (The Creation), sung by Judith Raskin, John Reardon, Alexander Young and the Camerata Singers, was first released in 1968. The Harmoniemesse (Wind Band Mass), sung by Judith Blegen, Simon Estes, Kenneth Riegel, Frederica von Stade and the Westminster Choir, was first released in 1975.

== Recording ==
Die Schöpfung was recorded using analogue technology on 17, 18 and 20 May 1966 in the Philharmonic Hall – afterwards renamed the Avery Fisher Hall, and then the David Geffen Hall – in the Lincoln Center, New York City. The Harmoniemesse was recorded using analogue quadraphonic (four-channel) technology in February 1973 in the Manhattan Center, also in New York City.

== Packaging ==
The cover of the album, designed by C. C. Garbers, features a photograph by Lesley Donald of a 1991 watercolour by the Prince of Wales: View of Ben Avon, Balmoral. (The back of the album credits the painting to A. G. Carrick Ltd, a company set up by the Prince of Wales to exploit his intellectual property rights for the benefit of The Prince of Wales's Charitable Fund. A. G. Carrick is an alias that the Prince derived in jest from his full, formal title: His Royal Highness Prince Charles Philip Arthur George, Prince of Wales, Earl of Chester, Duke of Cornwall, Duke of Rothesay, Earl of Carrick, Baron of Renfrew, Lord of the Isles and Prince and Great Steward of Scotland.) Also on the album's cover are a photograph of Bernstein by Ludwig Schirmer and a photograph of the Prince by dpa/Camera Press.

== Critical reception ==
=== Reviews ===
Joseph Haydn portrayed by Thomas Hardy in 1791

Alec Robertson reviewed Die Schöpfung on LP in Gramophone in January 1969, comparing Bernstein's recording with what he considered to be the best of its predecessors, a 1968 Decca album conducted by Karl Münchinger. In the work's Introduction, Haydn's depiction of the world's primordial chaos, Münchinger, he wrote, offered "mystery and awe", Bernstein drama and colour. In Bernstein's recording, "God was not so much moving over the face of the water as being moved", driven across it by the conductor. This contrast between Münchinger's and Bernstein's approaches continued when the archangel Raphael began his narration. Where Münchinger's Tom Krause sang "in hushed tones", Bernstein's John Reardon sang "loudly, and so [destroyed] the atmosphere just created". Matters improved on Bernstein's album when Alexander Young delivered Uriel's "Now vanish before the holy beams", Bernstein laudably animating a "rhythmic vitality... admirably suited to this work". Young's virile singing and the more lyrical performance of Münchinger's Werner Krenn were both enjoyable in their own way. As the soprano archangel, Gabriel, Münchinger's Elly Ameling was unequivocally better than Bernstein's Judith Raskin, with "more variation of tone" and "more sensitive feeling" than the American. The albums' rival choirs and orchestras all had much to commend them. Bernstein's Camerata Singers sang with "great enjoyment and excellent tone"; Münchinger's Vienna State Opera Chorus with superior diction. Similarly, where Bernstein's New York Philharmonic provided "finely pointed orchestral detail", Münchinger's Vienna Philharmonic had a string section that the Americans could not equal. Bernstein's album was better engineered than Münchinger's, offering "bright recording", "great clarity" and "excellent balance". In sum, though, even if Bernstein's release gave "considerable pleasure and [had] a great deal to recommend it", Münchinger's version was the more desirable of the two overall.

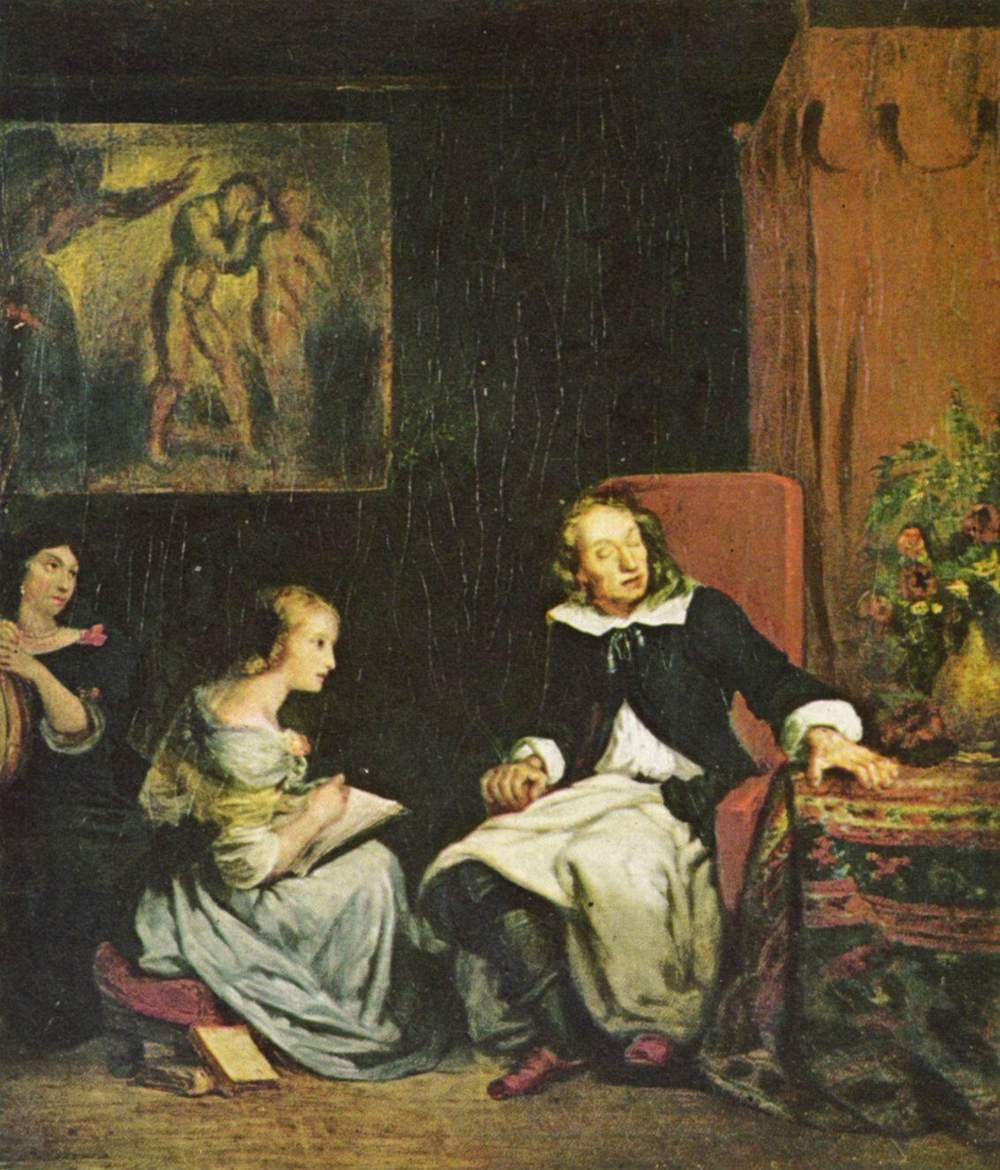
Eugène Delacroix's painting (circa 1826) of the elderly, blind John Milton dictating Paradise Lost to his daughters

Richard Freed reviewed the Harmoniemesse on LP in Stereo Review in September 1975. "There can be few scores of any kind", he wrote, "whose vigour, joy and unlaboured exaltation find so close a parallel in the characteristics of Bernstein's music-making." All four vocal soloists sang well, particularly Frederica von Stade in the Gloria's "Gratias agimus tibi" and Judith Blegen in the Credo's "Et incarnatus est". The chorus was no less impressive, if it could perhaps have sung even more lustily than it did. The New York Philharmonic, sometimes disappointing with other conductors, was on its best form for Bernstein. The recording quality was variable, but mostly satisfactory. "One hesitates to overwork such words as 'inspiration' and 'glory'," Freed concluded, "but these are the qualities that shine from every bar of this beautiful performance."

Roger Fiske reviewed the Harmoniemesse on LP in Gramophone in December 1975, comparing it with an Argo disc of the Mass conducted by George Guest and released in 1966. Bernstein's soloists, he thought, sounded as though they were "behind the orchestra and in amongst the chorus", Guest's as though they were standing much closer. Bernstein's arrangement was possibly in accord with the custom of Haydn's own day, but seemed to deny his soloists as much scope for self-expression as had been enjoyed by Guest's. Bernstein's chorus itself was "of the highest class", as was his orchestra, which demonstrated its virtuosity by coping with the breakneck pace that he had adopted, perhaps unwisely, for the end of the "Agnus Dei". The audio quality of his disc was fairly good, even if his balance engineer had allowed his woodwinds to "occasionally sound unnaturally prominent". Bernstein's was "a strong, vivid performance", but, although there was little to choose between the two discs, Guest's was the better both technologically and musically.

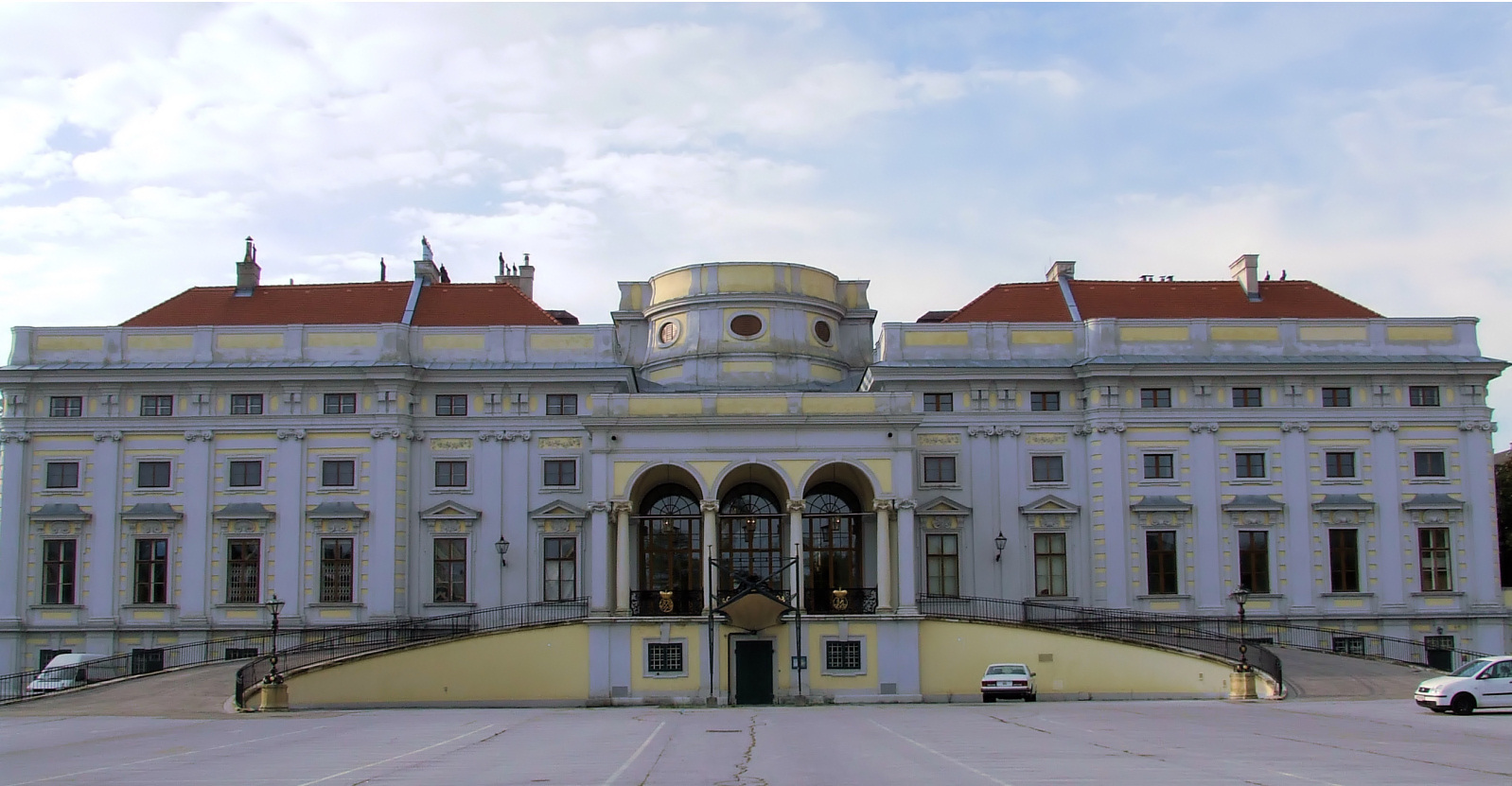
Vienna's Palais Schwarzenberg, where Die Schöpfung was first performed in 1798

David S. Gutman reviewed Die Schöpfung and the Harmoniemesse coupled on CD in Gramophone in May 1993. Bernstein's Die Schöpfung, he thought, was among the conductor's better essays in Haydn. Yes, the solo singing was problematic, and Judith Raskin had been "much criticized for her inadequate German". Yes, Bernstein's tempi were sometimes unorthodox. And yes, some numbers were hammy. But "the basic impression made [was] brisk and taut". As for the Harmoniemesse, "featuring some big-name soloists", it was "exciting (if rough-and-ready)". The album as a whole was "well worth considering".

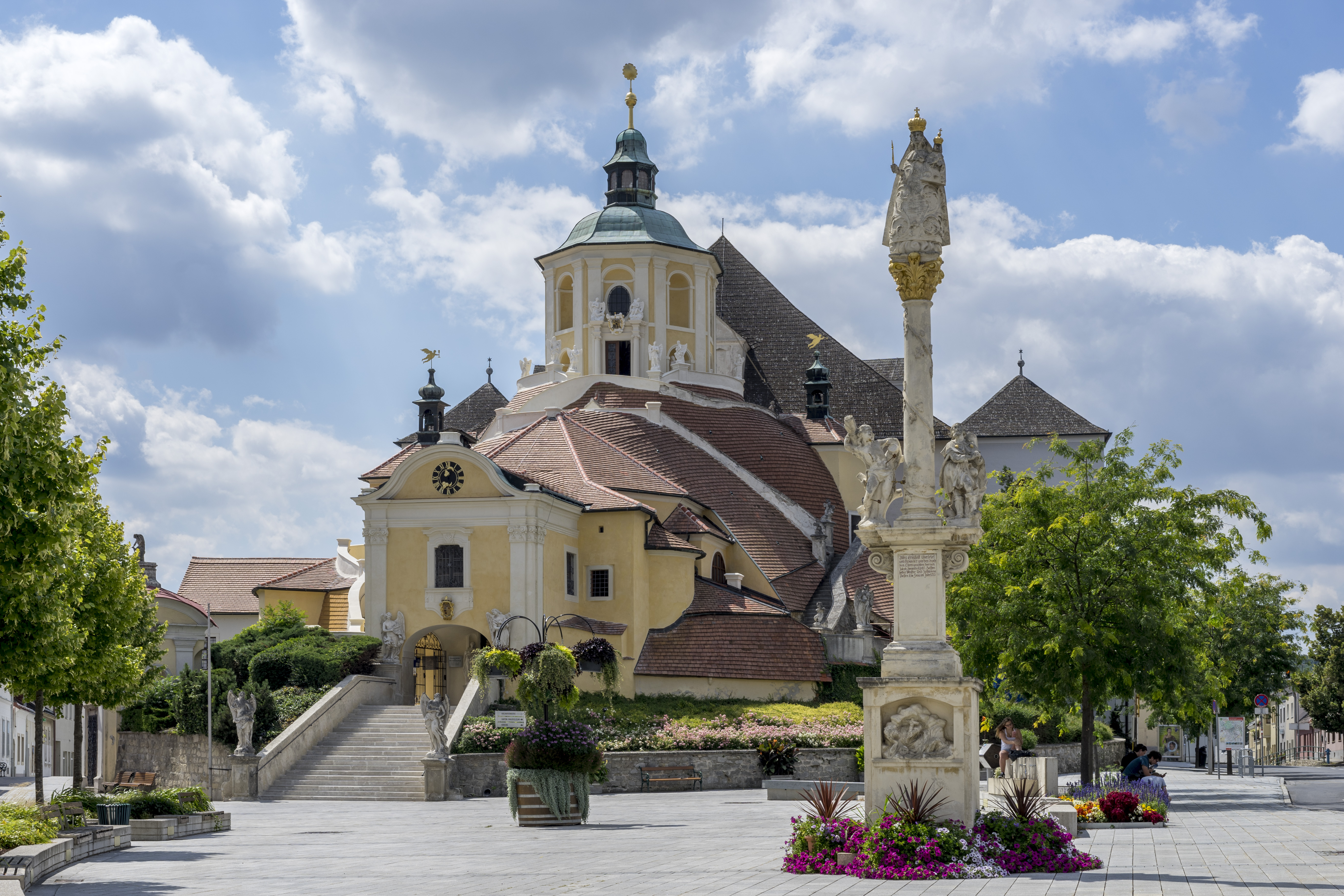
The Bergkirche – also known as the Haydnkirche – in Eisenstadt, Vienna, where the Harmoniemesse was first performed and where Haydn was entombed

Geraint Lewis included the album in a survey of the Harmoniemesse discography in Gramophone in April 2014. He made little mention of the soloists, noting only a "richly operatic contribution from a youthful Frederica von Stade". He found Joseph Flummerfelt's Westminster Choir "painfully stretched", and thought that their "democratic choral-society gusto" was not ideally suited to music meticulously crafted for performance during a religious service. He was happier with the relish that the orchestra displayed while delivering "big-boned Haydn in every sense". He characterized Bernstein's conducting as "galvanizing". "He clearly enjoys the music unreservedly and propels it forward with insight and enthusiasm", he wrote. His final verdict was that "the essential greatness of the music is not seriously compromised on this recording."

=== Accolade ===
In the September 1975 issue of Stereo Review, Harmoniemesse was included in the magazine's list of the "Best Recordings of the Month".

== Track listing, CD1 ==
Joseph Haydn (1732–1809)

Die Schöpfung, Oratorium für Solostimmen, Chor und Orchester (Vienna, 1798), Hob. XXI/2, with a text by Freiherr Gottfried van Swieten (1733-1803) after the Book of Genesis and Paradise Lost by John Milton (1608–1674)

Part One

- 1 (9:15) No. 1 Einleitung: Die Vorstellung des Chaos: Rezitativ mit Chor: "Im Anfange schuf Gott Himmel und Erde... Und der Geist Gottes schwebte auf der Fläche der Wasser" (Raphael, Chorus, Uriel)
- 2 (3:43) No. 2 Arie mit Chor: "Nun schwanden vor dem heiligen Strahle... Verzweiflung, Wut und Schrecken" (Uriel, Chorus)
- 3 (2:09) No. 3 Rezitativ: "Und Gott machte das Firmament" (Raphael)
- 4 (1:44) No. 4 Solo mit Chor: "Mit Staunen sieht das Wunderwerk... Und laut ertönt aus ihren Kehlen" (Gabriel, Chorus)
- 5 (0:50) No. 5 Rezitativ: "Und Gott sprach: Es sammle sich das Wasser" (Raphael)
- 6 (3:46) No. 6 Arie: "Rollend in schäumenden Wellen" (Raphael)
- 7 (0:37) No. 7 Rezitativ: "Und Gott sprach: Es bringe die Erde Gras hervor" (Gabriel)
- 8 (5:19) No. 8 Arie: "Nun beut die Flur das frische Grün" (Gabriel)
- 9 (0:14) No. 9 Rezitativ: "Und die himmlischen Heerscharen verkündigten" (Uriel)
- 10 (2:07) No. 10 Chor: "Stimmt an die Saiten" (Chorus)
- 11 (0:44) No. 11 Rezitativ: "Und Gott sprach: Es sei'n Lichter an der Feste des Himmels" (Uriel)
- 12 (2:46) No. 12 Rezitativ: "In vollem Glanze steigt jetzt" (Uriel)
- 13 (4:38) No. 13 Terzett mit Chor: "Die Himmel erzählen die Ehre Gottes... Dem kommenden Tage sagt es der Tag" (Chorus, Gabriel, Uriel, Raphael)

Part Two

- 14 (0:39) No. 14 Rezitativ: "Und Gott sprach: Es bringe das Wasser in der Fülle hervor" (Gabriel)
- 15 (6:19) No. 15 Arie: "Auf starken Fittiche schwingt sich der Adler stolz" (Gabriel)
- 16 (2:44) No. 16 Rezitativ: "Und Gott schuf grosse Walfische" (Raphael)
- 17 (0:30) No. 17 Rezitativ: "Und die Engel rührten ihr unsterblichen Harfen" (Raphael)
- 18 (4:23) No. 18 Terzett: "In holder Anmut stehn" (Gabriel, Uriel, Raphael)
- 19 (2:18) No. 19 Terzett mit Chor: "Der Herr ist gross in seiner Macht" (Gabriel, Uriel, Raphael, Chorus)
- 20 (0:34) No. 20 Rezitativ: "Und Gott sprach: Es bringe die Erde hervor lebende Geschöpfe" (Raphael)
- 21 (3:11) No. 21 Rezitativ: "Gleich öffnet sich der Erde Schoss" (Raphael)
- 22 (2:56) No. 22 Arie: "Nun scheint in vollem Glanze der Himmel" (Raphael)
- 23 (0:52) No. 23 Rezitativ: "Und Gott schuf den Menschen" (Uriel)
- 24 (3:25) No. 24 Arie: "Mit Würd' und Hoheit angetan" (Uriel)
- 25 (0:29) No. 25 Rezitativ: "Und Gott sah jedes Ding" (Raphael)
- 26 (1:28) No. 26 Chor: "Vollendet ist das grosse Werk" (Chorus)
- 27 (4:49) No. 27 Terzett: "Zu dir, o Herr, blickt alles auf" (Gabriel, Uriel, Raphael)
- 28 (2:46) No. 28 Chor: "Vollendet ist das grosse Werk" (Chorus)

== Track listing, CD2 ==
Part Three

- 1 (5:03) No. 29 Rezitativ: "Aus Rosenwolken bricht" (Uriel)
- 2 (9:13) No. 30 Duett mit Chor: "Von deiner Güt', o Herr und Gott" (Eva, Adam, Chorus)
- 3 (2:24) No. 31 Rezitativ: "Nun ist die erste Pflicht erfüllt" (Adam, Eva)
- 4 (8:29) No. 32 Duett: "Holde Gattin, dir zur Seite" (Adam, Eva)
- 5 (0:26) No. 33 Rezitativ: "O glücklich Paar, und glücklich immerfort" (Uriel)
- 6 (3:29) No. 34 Schlusschor (mit Soli): "Singt dem Herren alle Stimmen" (All)

Missa Nr. 12 B-Dur, Harmoniemesse (Eisenstadt, 1802), Hob. XXII/14

I Kyrie

- 7 (8:44) "Kyrie eleison", Poco adagio

II Gloria

- 8 (2:02) "Gloria in excelsis Deo", Vivace assai
- 9 (6:17) "Gratias agimus tibi", Allegretto
- 10 (3:25) "Quoniam tu solus sanctus", Allegro spiritoso

III Credo

- 11 (2:42) "Credo in unum Deum", Vivace
- 12 (3:43) "Et incarnatus est", Adagio
- 13 (2:42) "Et resurrexit", Vivace
- 14 (1:47) "Et vitam venturi", Vivace

IV Sanctus

- 15 (3:28) "Sanctus, sanctus". Adagio – Allegro

V Benedictus

- 16 (4:07) "Benedictus qui venit", Molto allegro – Allegro

VI Agnus Dei

- 17 (3:07) "Agnus Dei", Adagio
- 18 (2:38) "Dona nobis pacem", Allegro con spirito

== Personnel ==
=== Performers ===
Die Schöpfung

- Judith Raskin (1928–1984, soprano), Gabriel and Eva
- Alexander Young (1920–2000, tenor), Uriel
- John Reardon (baritone), Raphael and Adam
- Bruce Prince-Joseph, harpsichord continuo
- Bernard Altmann, cello continuo
- Camerata Singers
- Abraham Kaplan, chorus director
- New York Philharmonic
- Leonard Bernstein (1918–1990), conductor

Harmoniemesse

- Judith Blegen, soprano
- Frederica von Stade, mezzo-soprano
- Kenneth Riegel, tenor
- Simon Estes, bass
- Westminster Choir
- Joseph Flummerfelt, chorus director
- New York Philharmonic
- Leonard Bernstein, conductor

=== Other ===
- Thomas Z. Shepard, producer of Die Schöpfung and producer of the CDs' 20-bit remix
- John McClure, producer of the Harmoniemesse
- Francis Pierce, remastering engineer

== Release history ==
In 1968, CBS released Die Schöpfung as a double LP (catalogue number CBS 77221/1-2). In 1975, CBS released the Harmoniemesse as both a stereo LP (British catalogue number CBS 76410, American catalogue number M 33267) and a quadraphonic LP (American catalogue number MQ 33267). The four-channel release used Columbia's SQ stereo-quadraphonic matrix system.

In 1992, CBS issued the two works together on CD (catalogue number SM2K 47560) as the thirty-sixth of the hundred recordings in their Leonard Bernstein "Royal Edition", so called because each album in the series was illustrated with a watercolour by Prince Charles. The album was also available in a 37-CD box set titled "The Royal Edition: Vol. 2" (catalogue number SX37K 48179). The album included a 92-page booklet which provided the text of the Harmoniemesse in English, French, German and Latin, and the text of Die Schöpfung and notes by Andreas Kluge and Prince Charles in English, French, German and Italian. The booklet was illustrated with three of Prince Charles's paintings and five photographs of Bernstein.
