= Colours of Gospel =

- Choir
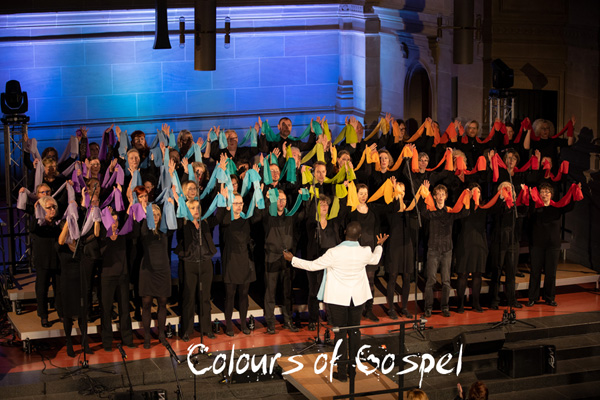
- Colours of Gospel, 2018 with Collins Nyandeje
- Origin: Christuskirche, Mainz
- Founded: 1998
- Genre: Gospel music
- Members: 70 (SATB)
- Chief conductor: Collins Nyandeje
- Website: coloursofgospel.com

Colours of Gospel is a German gospel choir that performs throughout Germany and other European countries. Established in Mainz in 1998, the choir is currently conducted by Collins Nyandeje.

The choir been a non-profit, non-denominational association since 2004.

== Choir ==
The choir consists of about 70 male and female singers in four-part line-up SATB (Soprano, Alto, Tenor, Bass). The members come primarily from the Rhine-Main area.

When performing, the choir optically builds a rainbow with their scarves which represents the international variety of gospel songs . The choir encourages the audiences to sing and dancing with the music.

== Repertoire ==
Some songs are supported by soloists from the choir. When performing, the choir is accompanied by the band "Fools of Rhythm" which consists of keyboard, guitar, bass and drums. Sometimes they are also completed by a brass ensemble. The lyrics are usually in English.

The repertoire includes traditional American gospel, Black gospel, White gospel and Negro Spirituals that are arranged by Collins Nyandeje . The repertoire also includes Latin Gospel. This music includes the soundtrack of the movie "The Gospel" with songs like "He Reigns" (Kirk Franklin), "Glorious" and "Because of who you are" (Martha Munizzi), "Friend of God" (Israel Houghton) and "You are good" (Kirk Franklin). he choir also sings European Christian choir music, called "Lobpreis (praise) and Anbetung (adoration)" ,

== Highlights ==
- 22025 One of four choirs demonstrating the power of choirs in the ZDF report ‘Mehr als Musik’ (More than Music)
- Choir tours to Hamburg, Dijon, Mönchengladbach, Saarlouis
- Supporting act for the Jackson Singers in Wiesbaden in 1998
- Active participation in the international Jazz festival "Bingen swingt"
- Television appearance in the Christmas edition of "Der fröhliche Weinberg" (The Merry Vineyard) on SWR in 2002
- Participation in the live show "Kikania" on the children's channel KIKA where gospel was introduced and explained to the young audience
- Concerts in Nierstein/Oppenheim during "Rheinland-Pfalz-Tag" and in Heppenheim during "Hessentag" 2004
- Active participation in the final ceremony on the occasion of 25 years of ZDF television church service
- Active participation in the ecumenical opening worship of the 2006 FIFA soccer world championship in Frankfurt
- Gospel concert as contribution of Diocese of Mainz for "Hessentag" 2007
- 4th International Gospel Church Days in Hannover 2008
- Anniversary concert with Edwin Hawkins in 2008
- 5th International Gospel Church Days in Karlsruhe 2010
- 6th International Gospel Church Days in Dortmund 2012
- 7th International Gospel Church Days in Kassel 2014
- Support act for Stefan Gwildis on his concert tour "Alles dreht sich" in the "Alte Oper" in Frankfurt in 2016
- 8th International Gospel Church Days in Braunschweig 2016
- 9th International Gospel Church Days in Karlsruhe 2018
- 17 years of "Mainzer Gospelnacht" in the pre-Christmas season in the Christuskirche in Mainz

== Discography ==
- 1998: Precious Light
- 2000: Studio CD: People get ready there's a train it's coming
- 2003: Live recording of the anniversary concert on 8 November 2003 in the Christuskirche in Mainz: Gospels, Spirituals and more
- 2009: Studio CD: All 4 You
- 2013/14: Contribution to the samplers of Gospel - Songs Against Poverty (2013) und Hessen Gospelt! (2014)
