= Christmas oratorio =

Oratorio written for Christmas or the Christmas season

A Christmas oratorio (German: Weihnachtsoratorium; French: Oratorio de Noël) is an oratorio written for Christmas or the Christmas season.

== Christmas oratorios as a set of Christmas cantatas ==
Some Christmas oratorios consist of a collection of Christmas cantatas, to be performed during several days of the Christmas season. Examples include:

- Christmas Oratorio, BWV 248, Johann Sebastian Bach's Weihnachtsoratorium, premiered from 25 December 1734 to 6 January 1735 in Leipzig.
- Liebes-Andachten, nach dem Jahrgang aus denen Evangeliis eingerichtet, cycle of Christmas cantatas by Gottfried Heinrich Stölzel, first performed 25–27 December 1719 in Gotha (music lost).
- Das Volck so im Finstern wandelt, Christmas oratorio by Gottfried Heinrich Stölzel, first performed 25–27 December 1728 in Gotha.

Ach, dass die Hülfe aus Zion über Israel käme, is a Christmas oratorio retroactively compiled from 10 cantatas by Gottfried Heinrich Stölzel, which were performed from 25 December 1736 to 6 January 1737 in Sondershausen (recorded 1999–2000).

== Other examples ==
- Christmas Story, SWV 435, by Heinrich Schütz, likely first performed in 1660, partially published in 1664.
- Vom Himmel Hock, MWV A 22, by Felix Mendelssohn, written in 1831.
- Oratorio de Noël, Op. 12, by Camille Saint-Saëns, written in 1858.
- A Swedish Christmas Oratorio, for 2 choirs, soprano solo and chamber orchestra, by Fredrik Sixten in 2009.
- Christmas Oratorio, for soprano, baritone, chorus, and orchestra by James MacMillan, written in 2019.
