= Giovanni Battista Maccioni =

Italian composer

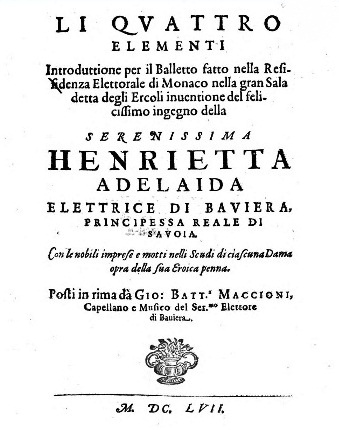
Title page of Maccioni's libretto for the 1657 ballet Li quattro elementi

Giovanni Battista Maccioni (floruit 1651 – 1674) was an Italian composer, librettist, and musician. His L'arpa festante (The Festive Harp), first performed in 1653, inaugurated what was to become the Bavarian State Opera and is often described as the first opera to be wholly written and produced in Germany.

== Life ==
Nothing is known about Maccioni's early life nor the date and place of his birth. The first record of him was in 1651, when he was hired as the court chaplain, poet and musician to Ferdinand Maria, Elector of Bavaria. When Ferdinand married Princess Henriette Adelaide of Savoy in 1652, Maccioni, who was considered an outstanding harpist, became her harp teacher. It was she who encouraged him to write and compose a work to celebrate the visit of Ferdinand III, Holy Roman Emperor to Munich in August 1653. The result was L'arpa festante, often referred to as the first opera to be wholly written and produced in Germany, although it was closer in its form and length to a dramatic cantata. Nevertheless, it differed from previous court entertainments which had been plays with musical interludes. L'arpa festante was an integrated musical drama with recitatives, solo arias, duets and a final chorus. The score is held in the Austrian National Library.

Princess Henriette Adelaide, herself portrayed the role of Feminine Beauty in the prologue of L'arpa festante and is said to have collaborated with Maccioni on several of his other libretti. His libretto for the opera L'Ardelia, performed in 1660 (probably to music by Francesco Cavalli) is dedicated to her. Maccioni remained in Munich until 1662, writing libretti for various court celebrations and ballets by other composers. He then left for Rome, where for the next 12 years, he continued to serve Ferdinand Maria and Henriette Adelaide as their agent, engaging Italian musicians for the court theatre in Munich. There are no further records of him after 1674. The date and place of his death are unknown.

Maccioni's music for L'arpa festante was performed by the Neue Hofkapelle München orchestra conducted by Christopher Hammer in October 2003 to mark the 350th anniversary of opera in Germany. The modern day Baroque music ensemble, L'arpa festante, takes its name from the work.
