= Pierre Even (composer) =

Luxembourgish composer

Pierre Even (born 4 December 1946 in Wiesbaden) is a Luxembourgish composer.

He is a descendant of the Even family from Beaufort, Luxembourg and Metz (France). He studied piano and composition in Wiesbaden with Karl-Wilhelm Brühl from 1959 to 1965, and religious music in Mainz with Diethard Hellmann from 1969 to 1973.

Since 1966 performances of orchestra music, chamber music and religious music, among others: Tango para los oídos (2005), Dithyrambus for Strings (1966), Concertino for viola and string orchestra, Op.11 (1970, 2004), Trio for Flute, Clarinet and Bassoon (2001), Neuf caractères pour violon et piano (2004), Sonata for Cello and Piano (2004), different works for organ (since 1966) and for choir (since 1971), two cantatas (1971/1972), Pastorale for four Trombones (2002).
