= Diethard Hellmann =

German Kantor, composer, and teacher

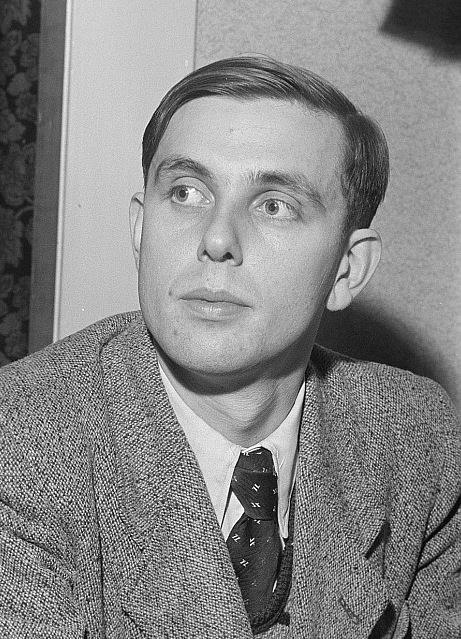
- Hellmanns in 1953
- Born: 28 December 1928; Grimma, Saxony, Germany
- Died: 14 October 1999 (aged 70); Deisenhofen, Bavaria, Germany
- Education: Thomanerchor
- Occupations: Church musician; Composer; Academic teacher
- Organizations: Christuskirche, Mainz; Peter Cornelius Conservatory; Musikhochschule München

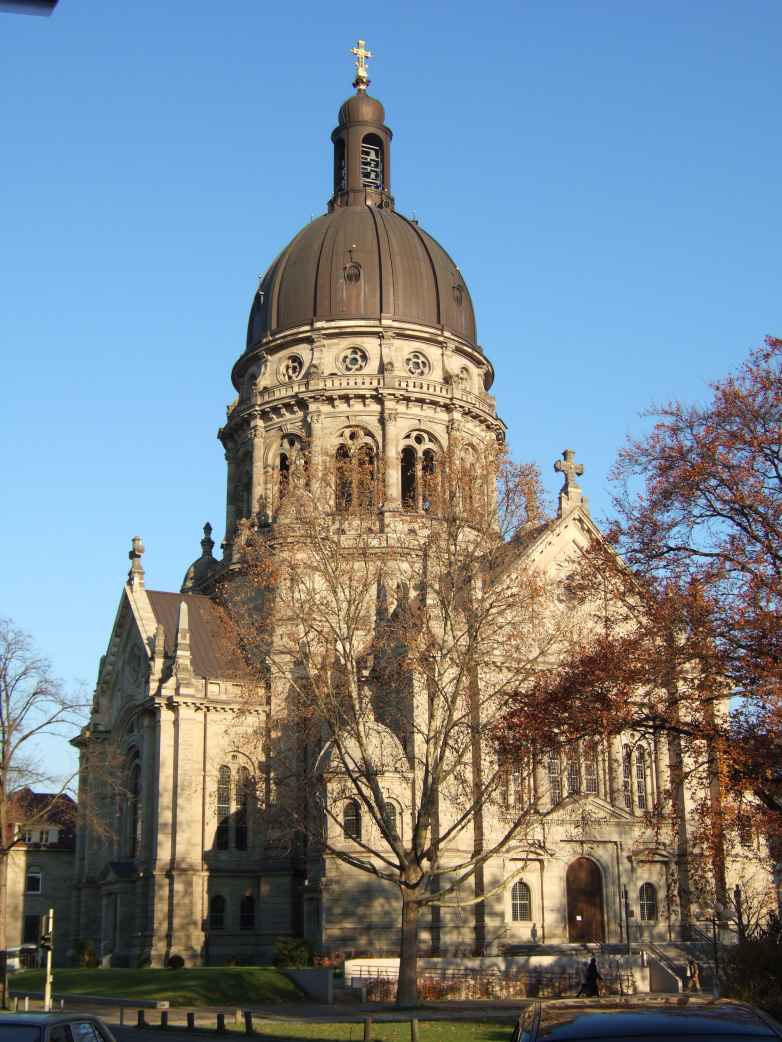
Christuskirche, Mainz, view from the west

Diethard Hellmann (28 December 1928 – 14 October 1999) was a German Kantor, composer and academic teacher, first in Leipzig at the Friedenskirche and the Musikhochschule, then from 1955 in Mainz at the Christuskirche and the Peter Cornelius Conservatory, finally in Munich where he was president of the Musikhochschule München from 1981 to 1988. He was known for a weekly Bach cantata in Mainz, broadcast by SWR.

== Life and career ==
Born in Grimma on 28 December 1928, Hellmann was a member of the Thomanerchor. He studied church music in Leipzig with Günther Ramin. Hellmann was the organist for early recordings of Bach cantatas by Ramin. He was Kantor at the Friedenskirche in Leipzig from 1948 to 1955. At the same time, he was a teacher for organ at the Musikhochschule Leipzig, conducting the choir of the Hochschule, and until 1951, a teacher at the Fürstenschule in Grimma. In 1950, he won a prize for organ at the first International Bach Competition. He started teaching choral conducting in 1952 and was appointed vice director of the department for church music in 1954.

In 1955, he became Kantor of the Christuskirche in Mainz, where he conducted the Kantorei, which in 1965, was named the Bachchor. In November 1955, he performed a concert of Bach cantatas. In 1958, he was awarded a prize by German broadcaster Südwestfunk (SWF) for his composition Musik auf Christi Himmelfahrt (Music for Ascension). He ran a series of Bach cantatas broadcast by SWR.

Hellmann was a teacher for Protestant church music at the Peter Cornelius Conservatory of Mainz, and at the Johannes Gutenberg-Universität Mainz as well from 1959, where he was professor from 1964. He published sheet music, including reconstructions of Bach's Ärgre dich, o Seele, nicht, BWV 186a for the Third Sunday in Advent, Singet dem Herrn ein neues Lied, BWV 190 and the St Mark Passion.

Hellmann took the Bachchor on concert tours to France, Poland and Israel. He collaborated with singers such as Peter Schreier, Aldo Baldin, Ria Bollen, Ursula Buckel, Eva Csapó, Agnes Giebel, Julia Hamari, Ernst Haefliger, Philippe Huttenlocher, Georg Jelden, Helena Jungwirth, Siegfried Lorenz, Adalbert Kraus, Horst Laubenthal, Karl Markus, Barbara Martig-Tüller, Friedreich Melzer, Klaus Mertens, Siegmund Nimsgern, Ernst Gerold Schramm, Verena Schweizer, Jakob Stämpfli, Ortrun Wenkel, Kurt Widmer and Edith Wiens. With the Bachchor Mainz, he recorded more than 100 Bach cantatas, broadcast by SWF once a week.

Hellmann conducted the Requiem by Jean Gilles, Haydn's Harmoniemesse, the Oratorio de Noël by Saint-Saëns, Beethoven's Missa solemnis, the four Choralkantaten by Max Reger, and Frank Martin's Golgotha.

In 1974, he was appointed professor at the Musikhochschule München, where he was the director from 1981 to 1988. Among his students were Gabriel Dessauer and Pierre Even. He was emerited around 1995.

Hellmann died in 1999 in Deisenhofen at age 70. In a memorial service in the Christuskirche, the Bachchor performed Bach's Es erhub sich ein Streit, BWV 19, because Hellmann had loved the tenor aria "Bleibt, ihr Engel, bleibt bei mir!" (Stay, ye angels, stay with me).

== Recordings ==
- Bach / Pergolesi: Tilge, Höchster, meine Sünden, BWV 1083 (Psalm 51) (Kurrende 1966)
- Saint-Saëns: Oratorio de Noël (recorded by SWF in 1976)
- Bruckner: Motets, Kodály: Laudes organi, with Hedwig Bilgram, organ (1979)
- Mozart: Vesperae de Dominica (1980)
- Reger: Choralkantaten (1980, later CD)
- Chorales and choruses from Bach's Christmas Oratorio (1980)
- Haydn: Harmoniemesse (LP 1981)
- Bach: St Mark Passion (1983)

== Awards ==
Hellmann's awards included:

- 1980 Order of Merit of the Federal Republic of Germany
- 1982 Order of Merit of Rhineland-Palatinate
- Bavarian Order of Merit
