= Alexander Young (tenor) =

English tenor

Alexander Basil Young (London, 18 October 1920 – Macclesfield, 5 March 2000) was an English tenor who had an active career performing in concerts and operas from the late 1940s through the early 1970s. He was particularly admired for his performances in the operas of Handel, Mozart, and Rossini and of choral works of the 18th century.

== Life and career ==
After vocal studies at the Royal College of Music with Steffan Pollmann, and undertaking his war service, Young made his professional debut at the 1950 Edinburgh Festival as Scaramuccio in a Glyndebourne production of Ariadne auf Naxos conducted by Beecham. In 1953 he performed the role of Tom Rakewell in the United Kingdom premiere of Stravinsky's The Rake's Progress, a Third Programme broadcast. He would perform the role on stage at Covent Garden in 1962 and on record in the composer's own version from 1964. He sang Orpheus in Monteverdi, Gluck and Offenbach's version of the story.

In 1958 Young took part, with Jennifer Vyvyan and the Goldsbrough Orchestra, in two concerts broadcast on the Third Programme, of excerpts from Mozart operas conducted by Charles Mackerras, incorporating important sources from the Fürstenberg Library in Donaueschingen, an early effort to perform these works in a historically-informed manner.

He created the roles of Charles Darnay in Benjamin's A Tale of Two Cities (1953), Philippe in Berkeley's A Dinner Engagement (1954) and Cicero in Hamilton's The Catiline Conspiracy (1974).

After retiring from the stage, he served as the head of vocal studies of the Royal Northern College of Music from 1973 to 1986.

Grove described him as "a stylish singer with a silvery tenor which he used with intense musicianship" pointing to "his many recordings of operas and oratorios by Handel.

== Recordings ==
Young's opera recordings include Alceste (Evandro) 1956, The Gondoliers (Luiz, Francesco) 1957, Iolanthe (Earl Tolloller) 1959, Patience (Duke of Dunstable) 1962, The Rake's Progress (Tom Rakewell) 1963, Samson (title role) 1968, Tamerlano (Bajazet) 1970, and Saul and David (David) 1972. In the field of song, for Argo, Young recorded On Wenlock Edge by Vaughan Williams, The Curlew and other songs by Peter Warlock, The Holy Sonnets of John Donne and Seven Sonnets of Michelangelo by Britten, and an LP of songs by Quilter. A recording of Liszt's A Faust Symphony, S108, with the Beecham Choral Society, and Royal Philharmonic Orchestra under Thomas Beecham from 1956 was issued by Somm.

== See also ==
- Haydn: Die Schöpfung (Leonard Bernstein recording)
