= Carolyn Watkinson =

British mezzo-soprano singer (1949-)

Carolyn Watkinson (born 19 March 1949) is an English mezzo-soprano, specialising in baroque music. Her voice is alternately characterized as mezzo-soprano and contralto.

Watkinson was born in Preston and studied at the Royal Manchester College of Music and in The Hague. In 1978 she sang Rameau's Phèdre (Hippolyte et Aricie) at the English Bach Festival at London's Royal Opera House, Covent Garden. In 1979 she appeared as Monteverdi's Nero (L'incoronazione di Poppea) with De Nederlandse Opera in Amsterdam. Also in 1979 she was featured as the contralto soloist in Christopher Hogwood's landmark recording of Handel's Messiah, with the Academy of Ancient Music.

In 1981 Watkinson made her La Scala debut in the title role of Ariodante and sang Rossini's Rosina (Il barbiere di Siviglia) in Stuttgart. She appeared as Gluck's Orfeo (Orfeo ed Euridice) with the Glyndebourne Touring Opera in 1982, and made her formal debut at Glyndebourne as Cherubino (Mozart's Le Nozze di Figaro) in 1984.

In 1987 Watkinson toured Australia. She was a soloist in Bach's St. John Passion at Gloucester Cathedral in a performance shown on BBC TV on Good Friday in 1989. In 1990, she appeared as Dido in Purcell's Dido and Aeneas at the Salerno Cathedral and sang Nero at the Innsbruck Festival of Early Music.

== Recordings ==
- Baroque Opera Recital: Carolyn Watkinson with Jan de Vriend and Amsterdam Bach Soloists. Arias by Purcell, Handel and Gluck. EtCetera Records ETC 1064
- Recital at Wigmore Hall, Bizet, Brahms, Berg, Dvorak and Ives: Carolyn Watkinson with Tan Crone. Arias by Bizet, Brahms, Berg, Dvorak and Ives. EtCetera Records ETC 1007
- Bach: Weihnachtsoratorium BWV 248 with Barbara Schlick, Kurt Equiluz, Michel Brodard. Ensemble De Lausanne, dir M Corboz. Warner Classics, Catalog 686217
- Agostino Steffani: Duetti da camera with John Elwes, Paul Eswood and Daniella Mazzucato. Alan Cutis and Wouter Wouter Möller. Archiv, Catalog: 437083-2
- Handel: Aci, Galatea e Polifemo with Emma Kirkby and David Thomas. London Baroque, dir Charles Medlam. Harmonia Mundi France, Catalog: HMC901253.54
- Handel: Rinaldo Performers: Jeanette Scovotti, Ileana Cotrubas, Carolyn Watkinson, Paul Esswood and others. La Grande Ecurie et la Chambre du Roy, dir. Jean-Claude Malgoire. Sony, Catalog: 7576412
- Handel: Serse Performers: Paul Esswood, Carolyn Watkinson, Barbara Hendricks and others. La Grande Ecurie et la Chambre du Roy, dir. Jean-Claude Malgoire. Sony, Catalog: 752724
- Collectors Edition - Handel: Oratorios Performers: Emma Kirkby, Carolyn Watkinson, Judith Nelson, Paul Elliott, David Thomas and others. Christopher Hogwood, Academy of Ancient Music, Christ Church Cathedral Choir, Oxford New College Choir. Decca, Catalog: 000529602
- Handel: Messiah Performers: Emma Kirkby, Paul Elliott, Carolyn Watkinson, David Thomas and others. Christopher Hogwood, Academy of Ancient Music, Christ Church Cathedral Choir. L'Oiseau Lyre, Catalog: 430488
- Handel: Alexander's Feast Performers: Ashley Stafford, Carolyn Watkinson, Donna Brown, Nigel Robson and others. John Eliot Gardiner, English Baroque Soloists, Monteverdi Choir. Philips, Catalog: 000852702
- Handel: Solomon Performers: Carolyn Watkinson, Anthony Rolfe Johnson, Nancy Argenta, Barbara Hendricks and others. John Eliot Gardiner, English Baroque Soloists, Monteverdi Choir. Philips, Catalog: 000667002
- Bach: Cantatas Bwv 206, 215 Performers: Carolyn Watkinson, Edith Mathis, Peter Schreier, Siegfried Lorenz and others. Berlin Soloists, Berlin Chamber Orchestra, dir Peter Schreier. Berlin Classics, Catalog: 2422
- Bach: Zerreisset Bwv 205, Vereinigte Zwieracht Bwv 207 Performers: Carolyn Watkinson, Edith Mathis, Peter Schreier, Siegfried Lorenz and others. Berlin Soloists, Berlin Chamber Orchestra, dir Peter Schreier. Berlin Classics, Catalog: 2392
- Bach: Mass in B Minor Highlights Performers: Carolyn Watkinson, Edith Mathis, Peter Schreier, Siegfried Lorenz and others. Berlin Soloists, Berlin Chamber Orchestra, dir Peter Schreier. Berlin Classics, Catalog: 4910
- Bach: Alto Arias Performers: Helen Watts, Carolyn Watkinson, Hildegard Laurich, Julia Hamari and others. Helmuth Rilling, Stuttgart Bach Collegium. Hänssler Classic, Catalog: 98243
- Bach: Magnificat Performers: Paul Elliott, Carolyn Watkinson, Emma Kirkby, David Thomas and others. Simon Preston, Christopher Hogwood, Christ Church Cathedral Choir, Academy of Ancient Music. L'oiseau Lyre, Catalog: 443199
- Vivaldi: Gloria, Motets, Cantatas Performers: Emma Kirkby, Carolyn Watkinson, Catherine Bott and others. Philip Pickett, Christopher Hogwood, Simon Preston, New London Consort, Academy of Ancient Music, Christ Church Cathedral Choir. L'oiseau Lyre, Catalog: 455727
- Purcell: Dido And Aeneas Performers: George Mosley, Carolyn Watkinson. John Eliot Gardiner, Monteverdi Choir, English Baroque Soloists. Philips, Catalog: 432114
- Monteverdi: Lamento D'arianna, Combattimento Performers: Nigel Rogers, Patrizia Kwella, David Thomas, Carolyn Watkinson. Reinhard Goebel, Musica Antiqua Cologne
- Haydn: Masses Performers: Emma Kirkby, Carolyn Watkinson, Judith Nelson, Shirley Minty, Rogers Covey-Crump and others. Simon Preston, Academy of Ancient Music, Christ Church Cathedral Choir. L'oiseau Lyre, Catalog: 455712
- Haydn: Arianna, English Canzonettas with Glen Wilson. Virgin Classics Veritas, Catalog: 91215
- Mozart: Requiem Performers: Emma Kirkby, Anthony Rolfe Johnson, David Thomas, Carolyn Watkinson. Christopher Hogwood, Academy of Ancient Music, Westminster Cathedral Boys Choir, Academy of Ancient Music Chorus. L'oiseau Lyre, Catalog: 411712
- Mozart: Requiem, Exultate Jubilate Performers: Judith Blegen, Carolyn Watkinson, Siegfried Jerusalem, Siegmund Nimsgern and others. Pinchas Zukerman, Helmuth Rilling, Mostly Mozart Festival Orchestra, Gächinger Kantorei Stuttgart, Stuttgart Bach Collegium. Sony Classical Essential Classics, Catalog: 89849
- Prokofiev: Alexander Nevsky, Scythian Suite with Kurt Masur, Leipzig Gewandhaus Orchestra, Latvian State Choir. Apex, Catalog: 7487472
- Wagner: La Chevauchee Des Walkyries Performers: Margaretha Hintermeier, Anita Soldh, Silvia Herman, Carolyn Watkinson and others. Conductor: Bernard Haitink, Mariss Jansons, Klaus Tennstedt, Otto Klemperer. Emi Classics, Catalog: 558096
- Schmidt: Buch Mit Sieben Siegeln Performers: Carolyn Watkinson, Peter Schreier, Kurt Rydl, Thomas Moser and others. Lothar Zagrosek, Austrian Radio Symphony Orchestra, Vienna State Opera Concert Choir. Orfeo, Catalog: 143862
