= Christuskirche, Mainz =

Church in Mainz, Germany

Coordinates: 50°00′26″N 08°15′59″E

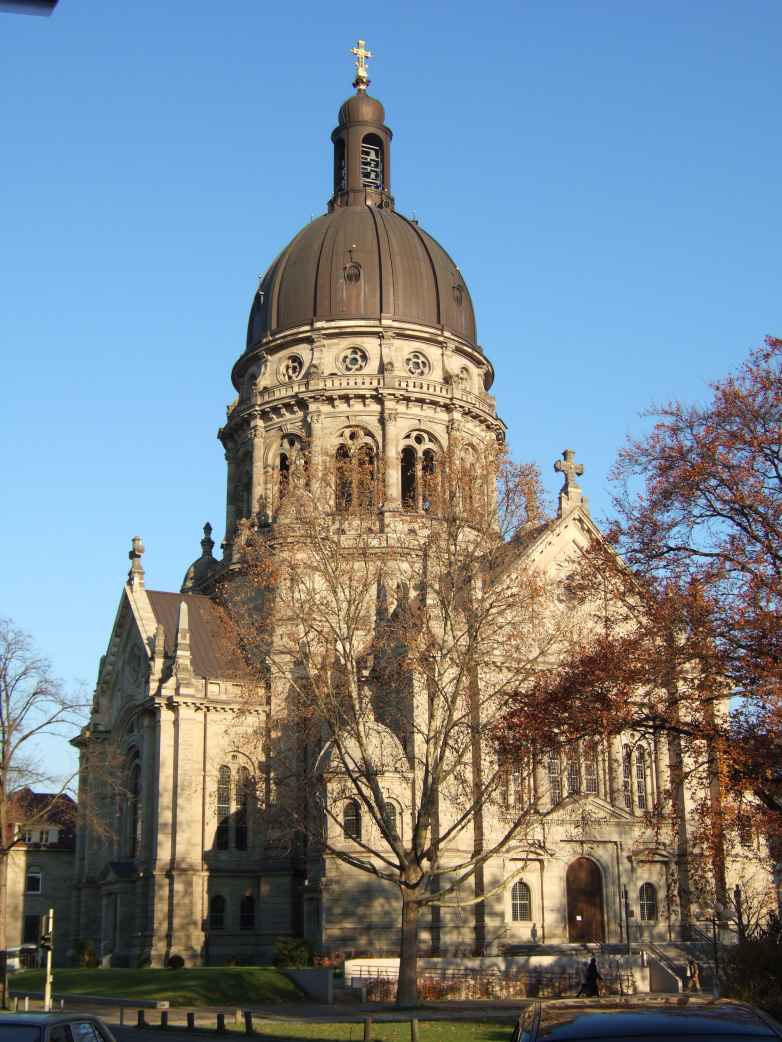
View from the west

The Christuskirche (Christ Church) is a Protestant church located in Mainz. The Christuskirche was built between 1896 and 1903 designed by Eduard Kreyßig. It was consecrated on 2 July 1903. After demolition during the bombing of Mainz in World War II the church was reconstructed between 1952 and 1954. The congregation forms part of the Protestant Church in Hesse and Nassau.

In the predominantly Catholic Mainz of 1802, only some hundred Protestants could be traced at the end of the Ancien Régime. Napoleon Bonaparte was the first to grant them the right of freely practising their religion and he expanded their civil rights. Previously Protestants had the status of "tolerated" human beings, a status they shared with the Jews. Around the year 1900 already 33% of the inhabitants of Mainz had the Protestant confession.

Due to increase of the Protestant community, they had to search for new space. The extension of the old city borders by the new expanded town Mainz-Neustadt during the last trimester of the 19th century opened the opportunity to demonstrate the self-confidence of the Protestant community by erecting a new church building. Along with the Kaiserstraße, a new twin lined three-lane boulevard, the church was erected by Eduard Kreyßig, the master builder of Mainz, in Renaissance Revival style. The church was intended to be a representative counterbalance to the Catholic Mainz Cathedral. The mighty dome excels other churches and buildings of the inner city of Mainz.

Besides services, the Christuskirche is shared by lovers of music, since Diethard Hellmann founded in 1954 the Bach Choir and Bach Orchestra to perform especially Bach's cantatas. Fans of Gospel music enjoy the yearly performances of Colours of Gospel. Traditionally the opening mass services of the University of Mainz at the beginning of the academic term take place here.

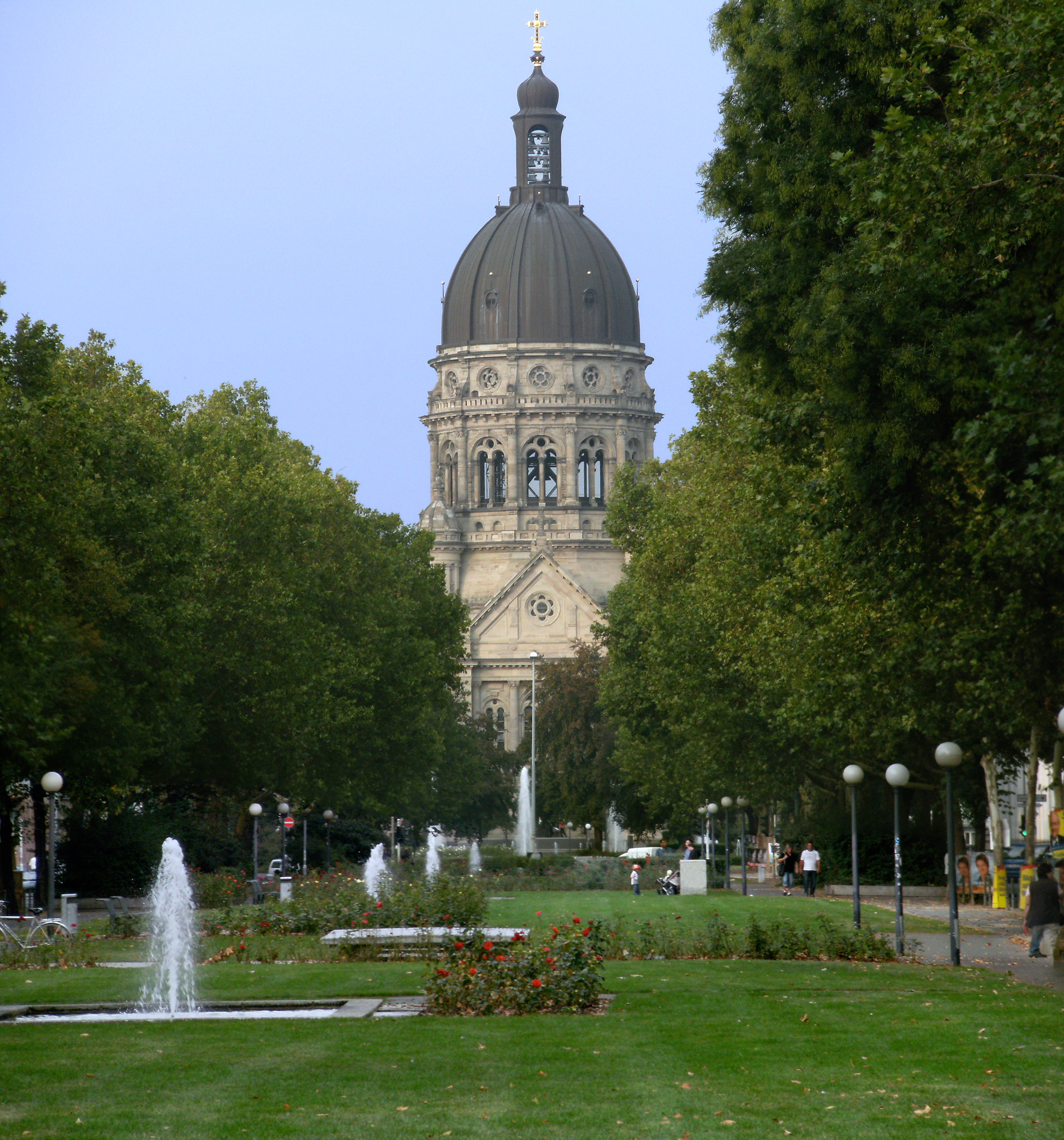
Kaiserstraße with view to the Christuskirche

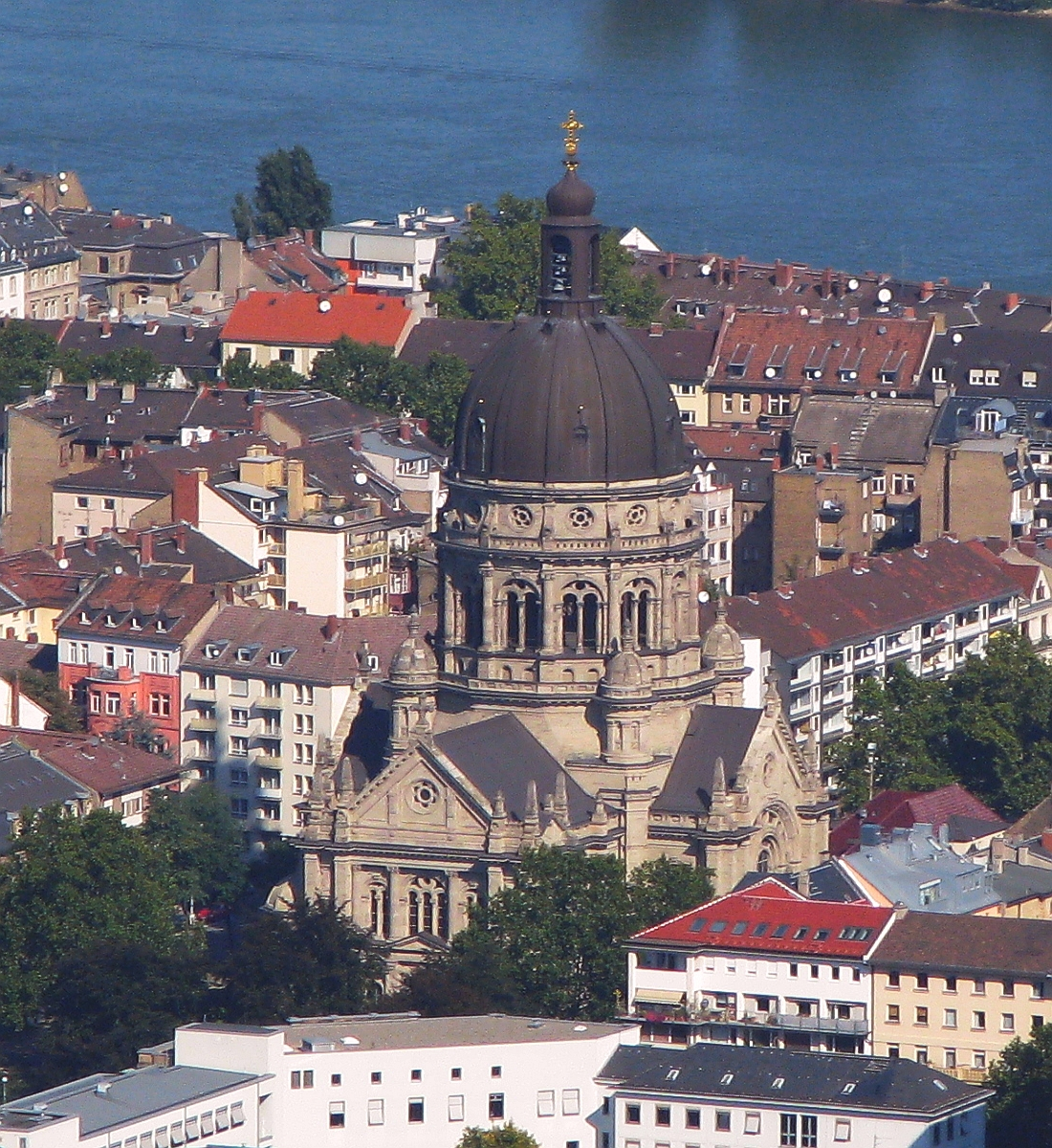
Aerial view of the Christuskirche

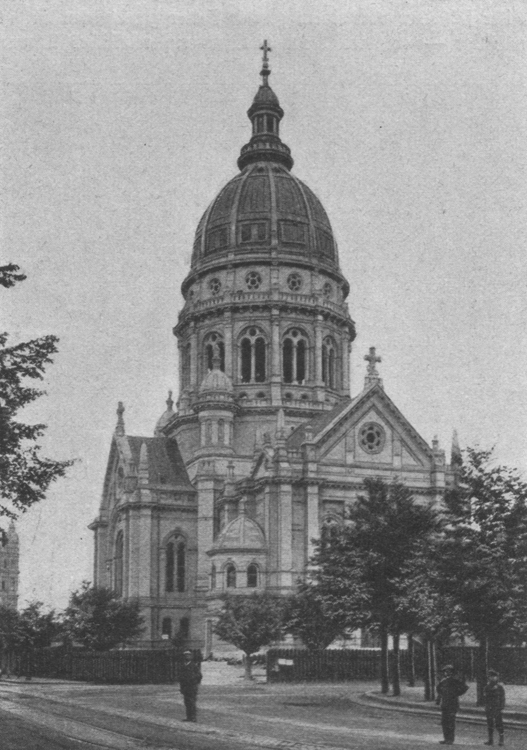
Christuskirche after the outer finishing in 1902

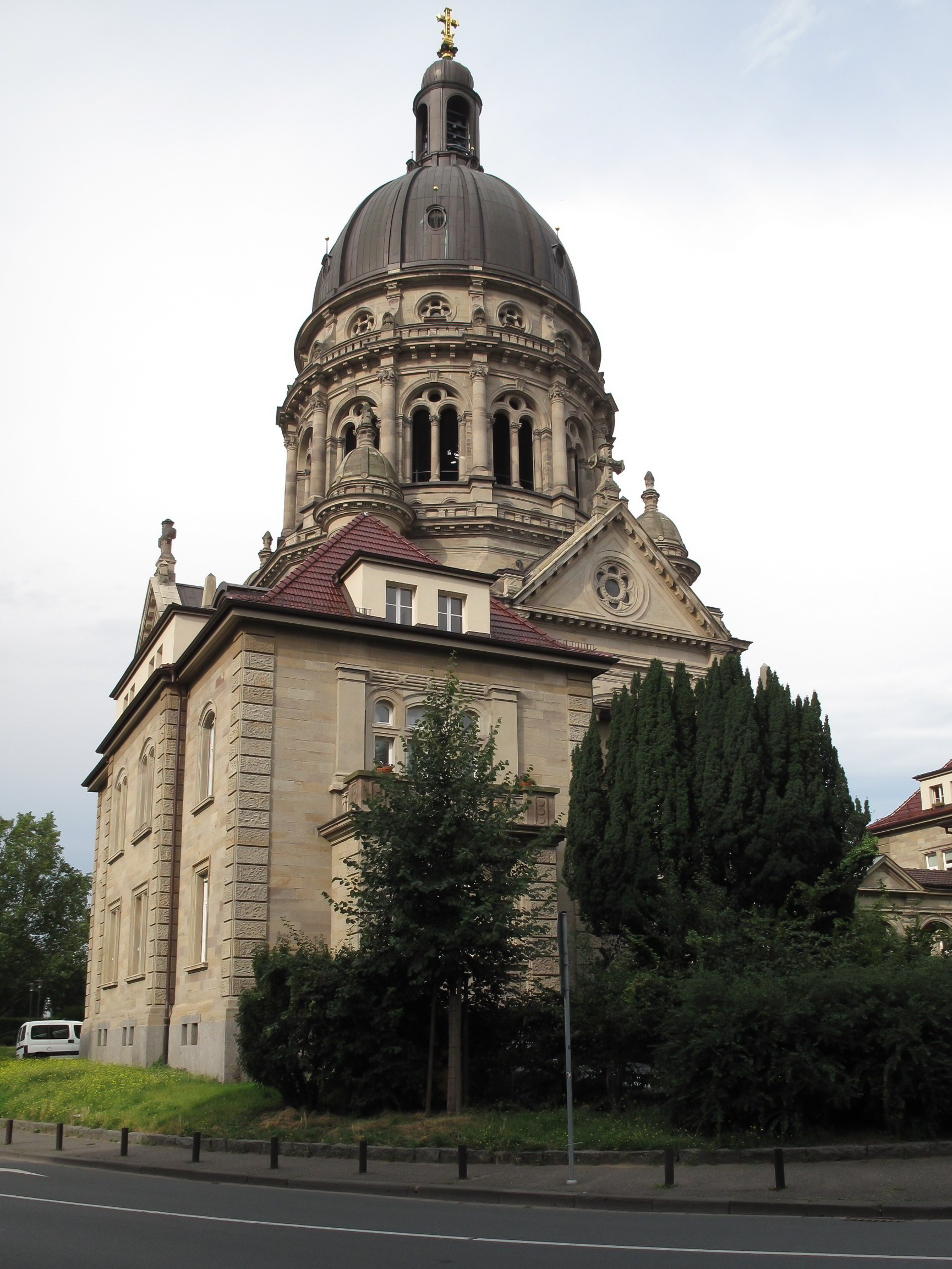
Christuskirche

== Literature ==
- Franz Fredriksson: Die neue evangelische Christuskirche in Mainz. In: Zentralblatt der Bauverwaltung. Jg. 23 (1903), Nr. 65 (15. August 1903), urn:nbn:de:kobv:109-opus-36739, S. 406-408. (Fünf Abbildungen)
