= Christmas Oratorio (MacMillan) =

Oratorio by James MacMillan

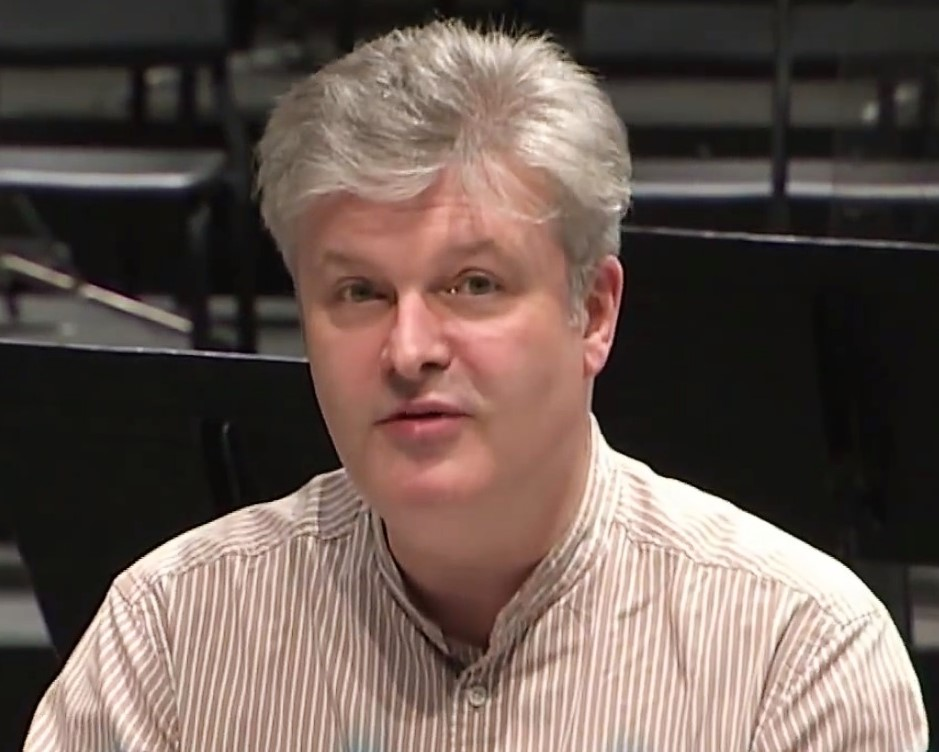
James MacMillan in 2012

The Christmas Oratorio is an oratorio for soprano, baritone, chorus, and orchestra written in 2019 by the Scottish composer James MacMillan. The work was commissioned by the London Philharmonic Orchestra with support of The Boltini Trust, NTR Zaterdagmatinee, Radio 4's concert series in The Concertgebouw Amsterdam, the Melbourne Symphony Orchestra, and the New York Philharmonic. Its world premiere was given by the soprano Mary Bevan, baritone Christopher Maltman, and the Netherlands Radio Philharmonic & Choir conducted by James MacMillan at the Concertgebouw, Amsterdam, on 16 January 2021.

== Composition ==
=== Structure ===
The Christmas Oratorio has a duration of about 105 minutes and is cast in two parts that are divided into seven movements each:

- Part I
1. Sinfonia 1 (orchestra)
2. Chorus 1 (chorus and orchestra)
3. Aria 1 (soprano and orchestra)
4. Tableau 1 (baritone, soprano, chorus, and orchestra)
5. Aria 2 (baritone and orchestra)
6. Chorus 2 (chorus and orchestra)
7. Sinfonia 2 (orchestra)
- Part II
1. Sinfonia 3 (orchestra)
2. Chorus 3 (chorus and orchestra)
3. Aria 3 (baritone and orchestra)
4. Tableau 2 (baritone, soprano, chorus and orchestra)
5. Aria 4 (soprano and orchestra)
6. Chorus 4 (chorus and celesta)
7. Sinfonia 4 (orchestra)

=== Text ===
The text of the oratorio comprises literature from various sources all relating to the birth of Jesus. The choruses are mainly composed of Latin liturgical texts with the addition of a Scottish lullaby in Chorus 4; the arias are set to poetry by Robert Southwell, John Donne, and John Milton; and the two tableaux quote from the Gospel of Matthew and the Gospel of John, respectively.

=== Instrumentation ===
The work is scored for solo soprano and baritone, choir, and an orchestra comprising two flutes, two oboes, two clarinets, two bassoons, four horns, three trumpets, three trombones, tuba, timpani, two percussionists, harp, celesta, and strings.

== Reception ==
The Christmas Oratorio has been highly praised by music critics. Reviewing the United Kingdom premiere, Boyd Tonkin of The Arts Desk wrote, "Within its generous, eclectic and impassioned 100 minutes, it packs a seasonal feast of wonderfully rich and accessible music." Fiona Maddocks of The Guardian similarly remarked, "The entire composition [...] is riven with short fortissimo outbursts as brutal as the four-part choral writing is at times exquisite and hushed. The babe-in-manger chorus at the start of Part 2, O magnum mysterium, from the matins for Christmas Day, could stand alone, though this majestic work deserves full performance."

Terry Blain of BBC Music Magazine declared the oratorio "one of MacMillan's finest ever pieces," adding, "The spiritual charge of MacMillan's Oratorio is made palpable, its heady mix of wonder, trepidation and profound mystery stirringly captured." Richard Bratby of The Spectator further praised the piece, remarking:

It's vigorous, unsentimental and completely unapologetic — a royal feast for a celebration on a cosmic scale. And how! The table overflows, with MacMillan's teeming influences functioning not as sonic fancy dress but as guests at the banquet, very much alive and doing what they've always done, with renewed power. Bach is the most obvious presence: the Oratorio's evening-long span harks back to Johann Sebastian's own gloriously over-filled Christmas Oratorio. But you'll also bump into Holst, Britten, Haydn and Beethoven, all glass in hand and delighted to see you. There are raucous shouts from Janacek and sudden, blinding glimpses of Olivier Messiaen. It goes further: when MacMillan alludes to plainchant, it's never in inverted commas. It's urgent and unselfconscious. He means it, and you can tell.

== Recording ==
A recording of the United Kingdom premiere of the Christmas Oratorio, performed by the soprano Lucy Crowe, the baritone Roderick Williams, and the London Philharmonic Choir and Orchestra conducted by Mark Elder, was released through the LPO record label on 4 November 2022.
