= Julia Kleiter =

German opera singer

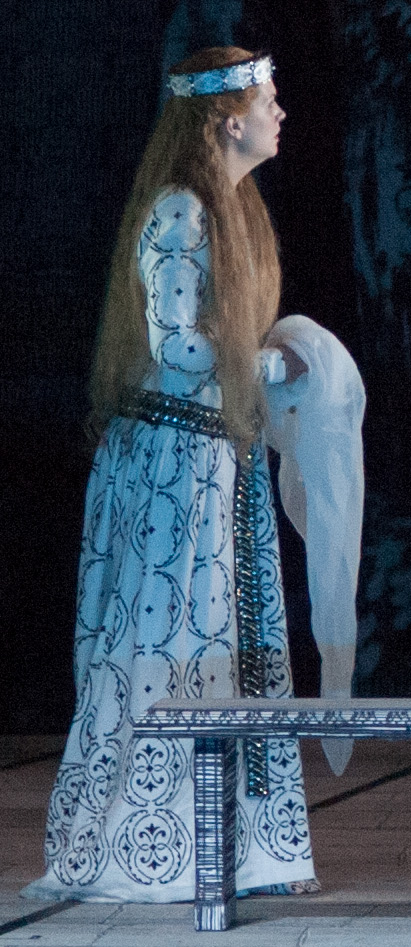
- Julia Kleiter in Fierrabras in 2014
- Born: 5 May 1980 (age 46); Limburg an der Lahn, Hesse, West Germany
- Education: Musikhochschule Hamburg; Musikhochschule Köln
- Occupation: Operatic soprano
- Website: www.juliakleiter.com

Julia Kleiter (born 5 May 1980) is a German operatic soprano and a concert singer. After her debut as Mozart's Pamina at the Opéra Bastille in Paris, she has appeared at major international opera houses, especially the Zurich Opera, and festivals, including the Salzburg Festival. She is also active as a concert singer, and has recorded Bach with Nikolaus Harnoncourt, among others.

== Early life and education ==
Kleiter was born in Limburg an der Lahn, and as a girl, she sang in the Mädchenkantorei (girls' chorale) at the Limburg Cathedral, later in the Cathedral Choir. She studied voice at the Musikhochschule Hamburg with William Workman and at the Musikhochschule Köln with Klesie Kelly. She first focused on concert singing.

== Operatic career ==
In 2004, Kleiter made her stage debut as Pamina in Mozart's Die Zauberflöte at the Opéra Bastille in Paris, conducted by Jiří Kout. She then performed the same role in Madrid, at the Bavarian State Opera in Munich, in New York, Zurich, at the Edinburgh Festival and the 2012 Salzburg Festival, with conductors such as Marc Minkowski and Ádám Fischer, among others. She appeared in the role again in Paris in 2014, conducted by Philippe Jordan.

Kleiter first appeared as Giunia in Johann Christian Bach's Lucio Silla in Winterthur, which led to continued work with the Zurich Opera, where she has appeared as Ilia in Mozart's Idomeneo, as Serpetta in his La finta giardiniera, conducted by Nicolaus Harnoncourt, as Sophie in Der Rosenkavalier by Richard Strauss, as Zdenka in his Arabella, conducted by Franz Welser-Möst, as Donna Elvira in Mozart's Don Giovanni in 2013, as Countess Almaviva in his Le nozze di Figaro in 2014 and as Fiordiligi in his Così fan tutte in 2016. She also performed there as Lisa in Lehar's Das Land des Lächelns.

She appeared as Papagena in Zauberflöte, conducted by Claudio Abbado, in Ferrara, Baden-Baden and Modena. She appeared as Susanna in Figaro in Verona, Reggio Emilia and Paris, and as Celia in Mozart's Lucio Silla conducted by Tomáš Netopil at La Fenice in Venice and at the 2006 Salzburg Festival. She also appeared as Cupid in Gluck's Orfeo ed Euridice, conducted by Riccardo Muti in Florence, and as Eurydice in the same work, conducted by Thomas Hengelbrock in Paris. She performed the role of Marzelline in Beethoven's Fidelio, conducted by Abbado in Baden-Baden, Ferrara and Madrid, and with Sylvain Cambreling in Paris, as Ännchen in Weber's Der Freischütz in Baden-Baden and at the Opernhaus Dortmund, as Zdenka with Ulf Schirmer and as Sophie with Donald Runnicles at the Deutsche Oper Berlin.

In 2012, Kleiter made her U.S. debut at the Chicago Lyric Opera as Almirena in Handel's Rinaldo. She appeared as Emma in Schubert's Fierrabras at the 2014 Salzburg Festival, conducted by Ingo Metzmacher. She made her role debut as Eva in Wagner's Die Meistersinger von Nürnberg in the 2015/16 season at the Berlin State Opera, conducted by Daniel Barenboim, and sang the role also in Paris with Jordan, and at the Bavarian State Opera. She is scheduled to make her debut as Countess Almaviva at the Royal Opera House in London in the 2018/19 season.

== Recordings ==
In 2014, Kleiter recorded the role of Emma in Schubert's opera Fierrabras, alongside Michael Schade in the title role with the Vienna Philharmonic, conducted by Ingo Metzmacher. She recorded Bach's cantata Wachet auf, ruft uns die Stimme, BWV 140, conducted by Harnoncourt in 2007, live at the Musikverein in Vienna, with the Arnold Schoenberg Chor and the Concentus Musicus Wien, alongside Elisabeth von Magnus, Kurt Streit and Anton Scharinger. In 2018, she recorded Bach's St John Passion and his Christmas Oratorio with the Bachchor Mainz, conducted by Ralf Otto.
