= Gerhild Romberger =

German opera singer

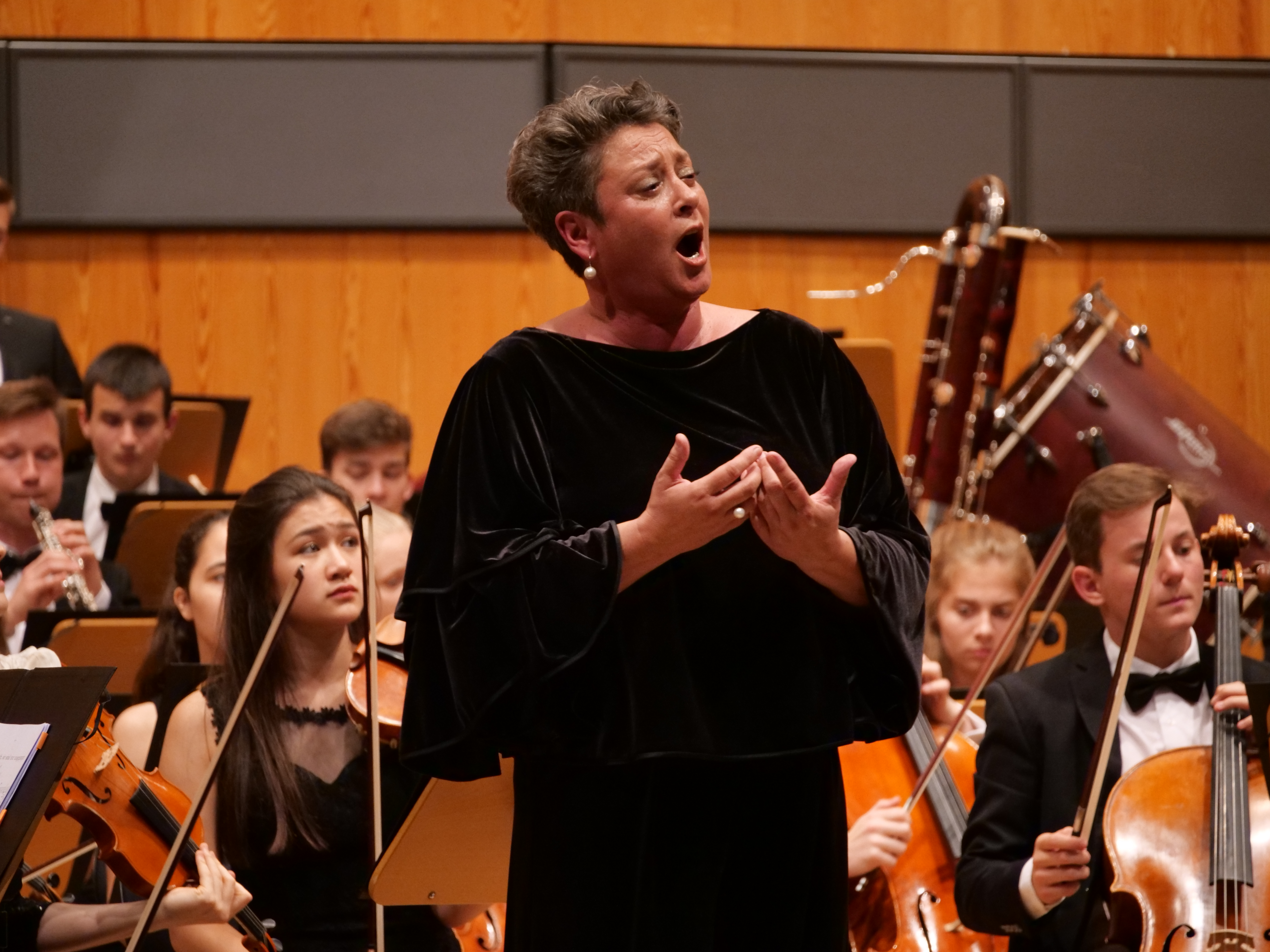
- Born: Sögel, Germany
- Education: Hochschule für Musik Detmold
- Occupation(s): Classical mezzo-soprano and contralto
- Organizations: Hochschule für Musik Detmold
- Awards: ECHO Klassik 2015

Gerhild Romberger is a German mezzo-soprano and contralto concert singer.

== Career ==
Born in Sögel, Germany, Romberger studied music pedagogy at the Hochschule für Musik Detmold, and then voice with Heiner Eckels. She graduated in 1990 with the artistic diploma (künstlerische Reifeprüfung) and took the concert exam in 1992. She took master classes with Hartmut Höll, Annie Schoonus, and Mitsuko Shirai.

Her repertories are mezzo and contralto parts in Lied, oratorio, and concert, from Baroque to contemporary. She has collaborated with the conductors Enoch zu Guttenberg, Manfred Honeck, Hermann Max, Ralf Otto, Hans-Christoph Rademann and Christoph Spering, and others. She made several recordings and has performed internationally, for example singing Beethoven's Missa solemnis in South America. She appeared in his Ninth Symphony at the Beethovenfest of 2013, alongside Susanne Bernhard, Andreas Schager and Franz-Josef Selig, with the Bamberg Symphony chorus and orchestra, conducted by Jonathan Nott. She performed the solo contralto part in Mahler's Second Symphony in a performance of the Rheingau Musik Festival 2017 at Eberbach Abbey, conducted by Christoph Eschenbach, as well as with Berlin Philharmonic and Andris Nelsons, the SWR Vokalensemble, Chor des Bayerischen Rundfunks and SWR Symphonieorchester.

She has been a lecturer of voice at the Hochschule für Musik Detmold and was appointed professor there in 2003.

In 2015, Romberger was awarded the ECHO Klassik in the Kategorie Kammermusikeinspielung des Jahres (Musik des 20./21. Jahrhunderts) (contemporary chamber music), with Alfredo Perl and tenor Stephan Rügamer, and the Detmolder Kammerorchester, for their recording of the chamber version of Mahler's Das Lied von der Erde.
