= Bachchor Mainz =

German mixed choir

- Choir
- Origin: Mainz, Germany
- Founded: 1955
- Genre: Mixed choir
- Members: 100
- Chief conductor: Ralf Otto
- Website: www.bachchormainz.de

The Bachchor Mainz is a mixed choir in Mainz, Germany, founded in 1955 by Diethard Hellmann who directed it for 30 years, focused on works by Johann Sebastian Bach and other Baroque composers. His successor Ralf Otto expanded the repertoire, especially by rarely performed contemporary music, and made the group known internationally.

== History ==
The Bachchor Mainz was founded by Diethard Hellmann in 1955. He conducted the group for 30 years, initiating a series of weekly Bach cantatas in collaboration with the broadcaster.

His successor included rarely performed works, especially contemporary music, but also pursued historically informed performances of older music. The choir worked with conductors such as Eliahu Inbal, Michael Gielen, Enoch zu Guttenberg, Péter Eötvös, Georges Prêtre, Peter Schreier, Ádám Fischer, Sylvain Cambreling, Riccardo Chailly and Philippe Jordan.

== Concerts ==
The Bachchor Mainz has performed regularly on tours in Germany and abroad, including France, Israel, Poland, Spain, and South America. It has performed regularly in the Philharmonische Konzerte at the Opernhaus Zürich since 1992. In 2003 it was ranked as best choir of the year by the association of critics in Argentina. The choir participated in festivals such as Rheingau Musik Festival, Mosel Musikfestival (singing in the opening concerts of 2013, 2015 and 2018), Weilburger Schlosskonzerte, Festival Europäische Kirchenmusik in Schwäbisch Gmünd, Echternach Music Festival and the Internationale Maifestspiele Wiesbaden.

In October 2018, the Bachchor Mainz performed the world premiere Gerhard Müller-Hornbach oratorio Im Spiegel der Angst, a commission of the Protestant Church in Hesse and Nassau on the occasion of 500 years Reformation in 2017.

== Recordings ==
In 2017, the Bachchor Mainz began a series of CDs of Bach's major works, the St John Passion, the St Matthew Passion, the Christmas Oratorio and the Mass in B minor.
