= Amarcord (ensemble) =

German male classical vocal ensemble

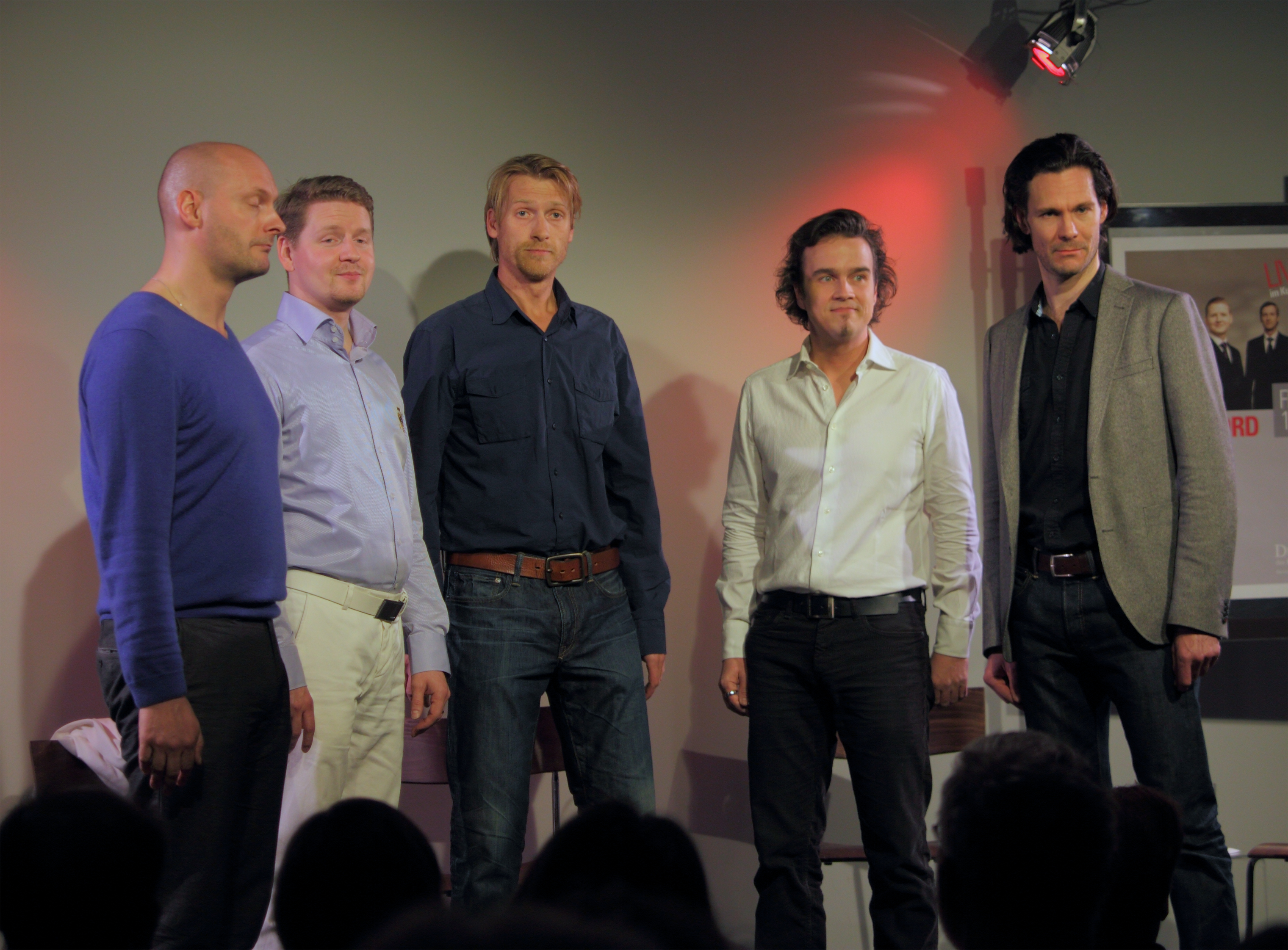
- Five members in 2013

Background information
- Origin: Leipzig, Germany
- Genre: a cappella music
- Years active: 1992–present
- Website: amarcord.de

Amarcord is a German male classical vocal ensemble based in Leipzig, founded in 1992 by five former members of the Thomanerchor. They primarily perform Medieval music and Renaissance music, as well as collaborating with contemporary composers. Until 2013, the group's name was Ensemble Amarcord.

== Singers ==
The ensemble typically performs as a quintet, singers have included:

- Wolfram Lattke (tenor)
- Robert Pohlers (tenor)
- Martin Lattke (tenor)
- Dietrich Barth (tenor)
- Frank Ozimek (baritone)
- Daniel Knauft (bass)
- Holger Krause (bass)

== Career and program ==
As members of the Thomanerchor, which Johann Sebastian Bach had directed in his time, the singers received the same vocal training and the knowledge of a vast repertory. The ensemble attended masterclasses with the Hilliard Ensemble and the King's Singers. In 2000 they were granted a scholarship from Deutscher Musikrat (German Music Council, a member of the International Music Council) and were named to the Bundesauswahl Konzerte Junger Künstler, which recognized young professional musicians and provides financial support for their concert engagements. They have appeared at international festivals and undertaken tours of Europe, North America, the Middle East, South East Asia, and Australia.

The first half of their concert programs is typically devoted to sacred music, while the second half shows secular music. In their first concert at the Rheingau Musik Festival, on 29 August 2002, they stepped in for the Chanticleer and performed in the Unionskirche, Idstein. They sang music of Pierre de la Rue, William Byrd, Albert de Klerk (1917–1998), and Francis Poulenc's Laudes de Saint Antoine de Padoue in the first half, works of Schubert, The Beatles, Otto Mortensen and others in the second. Their concerts programs, which they comment with a sense of humour, usually concentrate on a theme, such as Musik und Musiker in Paris (Music and Musicians in Paris) in another concert of the festival in Wiesbaden-Frauenstein on 26 August 2004. The first half contained compositions of Pierre de la Rue, Johannes Ockeghem, Pérotin, Gioachino Rossini, and Poulenc's Quatre petites prières de saint François d’Assise, the second half took through the centuries again with entertaining works of Pierre Certon, Pierre Passereau, Orlando di Lasso, Camille Saint-Saëns, and Dans la montagne of Jean Cras. Their concert in 2010 in Schloss Johannisberg picked up the festival's theme Fernweh.

In 2009 they participated in a performance and live recording of Bach's lost Markus-Passion, in the reconstructed version by Diethard Hellmann and Andreas Glöckner, in the Frauenkirche Dresden. The ensemble was augmented by sopranos Anja Zügner and Dorothea Wagner, and altos Clare Wilkinson and Silvia Janak, the Kölner Akademie was conducted by Michael Alexander Willens. The lost recitatives were replaced by recitation. In 2010, they performed Monteverdi's Marienvesper in the Berlin Cathedral with the Monteverdi-Chor Hamburg and the Lautten Compagney. In 2013 they performed the work as the annual Marienvesper of the Rheingau Musik Festival in Eberbach Abbey, forming the choir with additional guest singers Angelika Lenter, Hanna Zumsande, Stefan Kunath, David Erler, and Daniel Schreiber, and the Lautten Compagney conducted by Wolfgang Katschner.

== International festival for vocal music a cappella ==
In 1997 the singers initiated an annual international summer festival in Leipzig for a cappella vocal music, the International Festival for Vocal Music "a cappella", where a wide variety of guest ensembles such as the Swingle Singers, the Huelgas Ensemble, the ensemble Chanticleer, and The Real Group have appeared.

== Music composed for the ensemble amarcord ==
Contemporary composers such as Ivan Moody and Dimitri Terzakis wrote music for the ensemble amarcord. In 1998 Marcus Ludwig (born 1960) wrote in Leipzig Drei Gedichte von Paul Celan. One of these three poems of Paul Celan, Tenebrae, was recorded. They premiered in 1999 Apokathilosis (from the Orthodox vespers of Good Friday) of Moody who wrote for them in 2002 Chalice of Wisdom, Matins of the Feast of St Thomas. Terzakis composed in 2002 Kassandra after Aischylos, and Siegfried Thiele (born 1962) wrote for them Urworte, Orphisch after Goethe. Bernd Franke (born 1959) composed for them in 2002 unseen blue I for voices and bandoneón on words of Pascual Contursi, William Shakespeare, Arthur Rimbaud, Michael Frank, and Cesare Pavese, and in 2006 unseen blue II on words of Guillaume de Machaut, Arthur Rimbaud, John Milton, David Bengree-Jones, and Lodovico Agostini. Peronellas Fass (Peronella's Barrel) on a Boccaccio Decameron scene, written on a commission of the ensemble in 2005 by Aristides Strongylis (born 1974), was premiered at the opening concert of a capella in 2006.

== Prizes and awards ==
The Ensemble Amarcord won prizes at competitions in Tolosa, Spain (1995, Second Prize, Profane), Tampere (1999, Joint Third Prize), and the 1st Choir Olympiad in Linz (2000). In 2002 the ensemble won the German music competition Deutscher Musikwettbewerb and in 2004 the prize of the Festspiele Mecklenburg-Vorpommern (Music Festival of Mecklenburg-Vorpommern).

The ensemble won the Contemporary A Cappella Recording Award (CARA) of the Contemporary A Cappella Society several times, first in 2002 for their album Hear the voice, a collection of sacred music of composers Thomas Tallis, Francis Poulenc, Rudolf Mauersberger, Josquin des Prez, Darius Milhaud, William Byrd, Carl Orff, Pierre de la Rue, Peter Cornelius, and Marcus Ludwig. The program and the singing were reviewed:

"... the offering of works by Orff, Peter Cornelius, Rudolf Mauersberger, and Marcus Ludwig shows Ensemble Amarcord well attuned to their national heritage. The Orff work, "Sunt lacrimae rerum" is notably rhythmicized and reiterative, and an interesting contrast to the supple lines of the earlier Renaissance works. Similarly, Ludwig's "Tenebrae" explores a clustery palette and features some of the ensemble's best soft singing."

In 2006 they won the CARA in the categories "Best classical album" with Nun komm, der Heiden Heiland and also the second prize with Incessament, they won in the category "Best classical song" with Sanctus Incessament and second prize with Sic Deus Dilexit. Nun komm, der Heiden Heiland is a collection of music for Advent and Christmas around Veni redemptor gentium in settings of Ambrosius of Milan and Michael Praetorius, Nun komm, der Heiden Heiland of Johann Eccard, and compositions of Jacobus Vaet, Philipp Dulichius, Heinrich Isaac, and Hildegard of Bingen, among others. Incessament features music of Pierre de la Rue, especially his Missa Incessament, a five-part canonic mass ordinary, also known as Missa Sic deus & Non salvatur rex, La Rue's longest mass cycle. A review on this first recording of the work remarked:

"However, the Ensemble Amarcord itself deserves full credit for its breathtakingly smooth blend and celestial sweetness of tone. As with the Brumel work on the disc previously discussed, this is a worldpremiere recording of this lovely and important piece."

In 2010 their album Rastlose Liebe won the CARA in the category "Best classical album". Rastlose Liebe (restless love), after a song by Robert Schumann, is a collection of works of composers who lived in Leipzig in the 19th century, such as Felix Mendelssohn, Adolf Eduard Marschner, Heinrich Marschner, Carl Steinacker, August Mühling, and Carl Friedrich Zöllner. In 2012 they were awarded the Echo Klassik Awards in the category "Ensemble of the year, vocal music" for their Album Das Lieben bringt groß' Freud!.

== Discography ==
- Insalata a cappella (2001)
- In Adventu Domini (2001)
- Hear the voice (2001)
- And So It Goes (2002) The longest time; New York, New York; Breakfast in America; Blackbird; Juramento; In This Heart; Somebody to love; Only you; Hit the Road Jack; Rain in May; Since You Went Away; Can't Buy Me Love; Strangers in the Night; Good Vibrations; That Lonesome Road; And So It Goes.
- ensemble amarcord (2003)
- Pierre de la Rue: Incessament (2005)
- Nun komm der Heiden Heiland (2005)
- Vita S. Elisabeth (2006)
- The Book of Madrigals (2007) Dowland, Josquin, Banchieri, Senfl.
- Album français (2008) Poulenc, Rossini, Milhaud, Jean Cras, and Saint-Saëns.
- Heimlich Heimlich, EP (2009)
- Rastlose Liebe (2009): Robert Schumann, Carl Steinacker, Mendelssohn, August Mühling, Carl Friedrich Zöllner and Marschner
- Bach: Markus-Passion (2010)
- Von den letzten Dingen, with Cappella Sagittariana Dresden (2010) Anonymus: Gott sei mir gnädig (Psalm 51), Stephan Otto, Rosenmüller, Heinrich Schütz: Mit dem Amphion zwar; Musikalische Exequien, Schein, Heinrich Scheidemann, Michael Praetorius.
- anon.: Historia de Compassione Gloriosissimae Virginis Mariae, Marian office of the 15th century CPO (2010)
- Annees de Pelerinage (2011)
- Das Lieben bringt groß Freud!, works for male quartet and string quartet by Friedrich Silcher, Moritz Kässmayer and Max Reger, with Leipziger Streichquartett (2011)
- Jauchzet dem Herren alle Welt (2011), with Cappella Sagittariana Dresden
- Années de pèlerinage, madrigals by Carlo Gesualdo, Luca Marenzio (2011), complementing Liszt's piano work played by Ragna Schirmer
- Coming Home for Christmas (2011)
- Zu S. Thomas (2012)
- Chronik: Nahaufnahme – 20 Jahre amarcord (book with two CDs) (2012)
- Johann Sebastian Bach – Die Motetten (2012)
- Folks & Tales (2013)
- The Madrigal Book DVD (2014)
- Marienvesper (2014)
- Schubert (2016)
- Wald.Horn.Lied. Music for Male Voices and Horns by Franz Schubert, Robert Schumann, Karl Goldmark a.o. With German hornsound (GENUIN; 2016)
- Tenebrae (2017)

== DVD ==
- Kirchschlager, Angelika; Tomasz Stańko; Gottfried von der Goltz; Freiburg Baroque Orchestra (2004). Sounds Like Christmas. EuroArts Music International. OCLC 57126504.
