= Wiebke Lehmkuhl =

German contralto

- Born: 1983 (age 41–42); Oldenburg, West Germany
- Education: Hochschule für Musik und Theater Hamburg
- Occupation: Operatic contralto
- Website: wiebkelehmkuhl.de

Wiebke Lehmkuhl (born 1983) is a German contralto in opera and concert who has appeared at international leading opera houses and festivals, including as Wagner's Magdalene at the Bayreuth Festival, as Erda in Paris, and as Annina at the Salzburg Festival. She was the alto soloist in Beethoven's Ninth Symphony at the 2017 opening of the Elbphilharmonie in Hamburg.

== Life and career ==
=== Education ===
Born in Oldenburg, Lehmkuhl received her vocal training with Ulla Groenewold and Hanna Schwarz at the Hochschule für Musik und Theater Hamburg and graduated with distinction.

=== Opera ===
After guest engagements at the Opernhaus Kiel and the state operas Hamburg and Hanover, Lehmkuhl took up her first permanent engagement at the Opernhaus Zürich during the 2008/09 season, while still a student. She appeared there in Schönberg's Moses und Aron, as the voice from above in Wagner's Parsifal, as La voix de la mère in Offenbach's The Tales of Hoffmann, as Erda in Wagner's Das Rheingold, Annina in Der Rosenkavalier by Richard Strauss, and in Vivaldi's La verità in cimento, conducted by Ottavio Dantone. She gave guest performances, such as Third Lady in Mozart's Die Zauberflöte in 2011 at the Mozartwoche in Salzburg conducted by René Jacobs, and made her debut at the Salzburg Festival with Nikolaus Harnoncourt in 2012 in the same role, which she also performed at the Paris Opera in 2014.

In 2013, Lehmkuhl returned to Salzburg for a concert performance of Szenen aus dem Leben der Heiligen Johanna by Walter Braunfels, and appeared as Annina in 2014 in a highly acclaimed Rosenkavalier production by Harry Kupfer with Franz Welser-Möst conducting. Further engagements took her to the Opéra Bastille in Paris to perform in Wagner's Der Ring des Nibelungen directed by Günter Krämer and conducted by Philippe Jordan, and to the Bavarian State Opera in Munich, where she appeared as the First Norn and Floßhilde in Wagner's Götterdämmerung, conducted by Kent Nagano. She appeared at the Festival Ré Majeure, where she made her role debut as Gluck's Orfeo, conducted by Marc Minkowski. In 2016, she first appeared at the Bayreuth Festival as Stimme aus der Höhe in Parsifal; later performances there included Magdalene in Die Meistersinger von Nürnberg from 2017 to 2019, staged by Barrie Kosky with Michael Volle as Sachs and Johannes Martin Kränzle as Beckmesser. She first appeared at the Royal Opera House in London in the 2018/19 season as Erda.

=== Concert ===
Lehmkuhl performed at festivals including the Schleswig-Holstein Musik Festival, the Klassik am See, the Lucerne Festival and the festival La Folle Journée in Nantes, and in halls such as the Wiener Musikverein and the Gewandhaus in Leipzig, with the NDR Radiophilharmonie, the Tonhalle Orchester Zürich and the Bamberger Symphoniker. She has worked with conductors such as Daniele Gatti, Reinhard Goebel, Frans Brüggen, Andreas Spering and Riccardo Chailly. She appeared in the 2017 opening concert of the Elbphilharmonie in Beethoven's Ninth Symphony, conducted by Thomas Hengelbrock. In 2019, she sang there in Rossini's Petite messe solennelle with the NDR Chor there in the original scoring with two pianos and harmonium, broadcast live.

Her concert repertoire includes the alto solos in Mozart's Requiem and Mahler's Second and Third Symphonies. She recorded Bach's Christmas Oratorio in 2009 with the Rheinische Kantorei, the Kleine Konzert, Hermann Max. A reviewer noted: "She has a pretty dark voice, with a pleasant warm timbre. ... In the first cantata she gives an excellent speech-like account of the recitative 'Nun wird mein liebster Bräutigam', which is followed by a beautifully sung aria 'Bereite dich, Zion'. The timbre of her voice is ideally suited to this aria, and in the B section she uses a fine messa di voce on the long notes." In December 2013, she made her debut with the Berlin Philharmonic in Schumann's Scenes from Goethe's Faust conducted by Daniel Harding, who subsequently invited her to sing Geneviève in concert performances of Debussy's Pelléas et Mélisande with the Swedish Radio Symphony Orchestra in Stockholm and Cologne in March 2015. She performed Bach's St Matthew Passion in Vienna with Jordan.

== Awards ==
- 2006: Mozart-Preis of Hamburg
- 2011: Preis der Walter und Charlotte Hamel Stiftung, as Nachwuchssängerin (young singer) of the year

== Recordings ==
- 2009: Weihnachtsoratorium, BWV 248 (J. S. Bach) – Rheinische Kantorei, Das Kleine Konzert, Hermann Max, Veronika Winter, Jan Kobow, Markus Flaig
- 2010: Weihnachtsoratorium, BWV 248 (J. S. Bach) – Dresdner Kammerchor, Gewandhausorchester, Riccardo Chailly, Carolyn Sampson, Martin Lattke (Evangelist), Wolfram Lattke (arias), Konstantin Wolff (bass) (DECCA)
- Magnificat (Carl Philipp Emanuel Bach) – RIAS Kammerchor, Akademie für Alte Musik Berlin, conducted by Hans-Christoph Rademann (harmonia mundi)
