= L'Orfeo discography =

These lists show the audio and visual recordings of the opera L'Orfeo by Claudio Monteverdi. The opera was first performed in Mantua in 1607, at the court of Duke Vincenzo Gonzaga, and is one of the earliest of all operas. The first recording of L'Orfeo was issued in 1939, a freely adapted version of Monteverdi's music edited by Giacomo Benvenuti, given by the orchestra of La Scala Milan conducted by Ferrucio Calusio. In 1949 the Berlin Radio Orchestra under Helmut Koch recorded the complete opera, on long-playing records (LPs). The advent of LP recordings was, as Harold Schonberg later wrote, an important factor in the postwar revival of interest in Renaissance and Baroque music, and from the mid-1950s recordings of L'Orfeo have been issued on many labels. Koch's landmark version was reissued in 1962, when it was compared unfavourably with others that had by then been issued. The 1969 recording by Nicholas Harnoncourt and the Vienna Concentus Musicus, using Harnoncourt's edition based on period instruments, was praised for "making Monteverdi's music sound something like the way he imagined". In 1981 Siegfried Heinrich, with the Early Music Studio of the Hesse Chamber Orchestra, recorded a version which re-created the original Striggio libretto ending, adding music from Monteverdi's 1616 ballet Tirsi e Clori for the Bacchante scenes. Among more recent recordings, that of Emmanuelle Haïm has been praised for its dramatic effect. The 21st century has seen the issue of an increasing number of recordings on DVD and Blu-ray.

== Audio ==
Year of recording	Cast Orfeo; Euridice; La musica; Messenger; Proserpina	Opera house/Orchestra Conductor	Label and year of issue	Notes	Refs
1939	Enrico de Franceschi; Ginevra Vivante (Euridice and La musica); Elena Nicolai; Vittoria Palombini	Orchestra of La Scala Milan; Ferruccio Calusio	78 rpm: La Voce del Padrone DB 5370-5381; CD (2004): Walhall Eternity Series WLCD 0060 (2 CDs)	First complete recording (Milan, December 1939)	
1949	Max Meili; Elfriede Trötschel; Eva Fleischer; Gerda Lammers (Messenger and Proserpina)	Orchester des Berliner Rundfunks; Helmut Koch	LP Eterna 821 036 {3 discs} CD (2001) Berlin Classics 0094342BC (2 CDS)	Performed in German, first LP version	
1954	Gino Sinimberghi; Uta Graf; Patricia Brinton (La musica)	Wiener Singakedemie and Vienna Symphony Orchestra; Paul Hindemith	CD (2010): Andromeda, ANDRCD9069 (2 CDs), also CD (2010) Music & Arts - MA1237 (2 CDs)	Recorded at the Konzerthaus, Vienna on 3 June 1954, an attempt to reconstruct the first performance of the opera in 1607. Not issued as a recording until 2010	
1955	Helmut Krebs; Hanni Mack-Cosack; Margot Guilleaume (La musica and Proserpina); Jeanne Deroubaix	Orchester der Sommerlichen Musiktage Hitzacker, Hamburg; August Wenzinger	LP: Deutsche Grammophon; Archive APM 4057-4058 {2 discs}		
1960	Gérard Souzay; Judith Raskin; Doris Yarick; Regina Sarfaty; Evelyn Sachs	New York City Opera; Leopold Stokowski	CD (2006): Mitridate Ponto PO 1046 (2 CDs)	Recording of a live performance by the New York City Opera, 29 September 1960, recording not issued until 2006	
1968	Eric Tappy; Magali Schwartz; Wally Staempfli; Laura Sarti; Juliette Bise	Ensemble Vocal et Instrumental de Lausanne; Michel Corboz	LP: Erato STU 70440-42 (3 discs); CD (1995): Erato 4509-98531-2		
1969	Lajos Kozma; Rotraud Hansmann (Euridice and La musica); Cathy Berberian; Eiko Katanosaka	Concentus Musicus Wien; Nikolaus Harnoncourt	LP: Telefunken SKH 21/1-3 (3 discs); CD (1985): Teldec ZA 8 35020 {2CDS}	Later CD release (2008): Teldec 2292 42494-2 (2CDS)	
1973	Nigel Rogers; Emilia Petrescu (Euridice and La musica); Anna Reynolds (Messenger and Proserpina)	Instralmentalsolisten Camerata Accademica Hamburg; Jürgen Jürgens	LP: Deutsche Grammophon; Archiv Produktion 2723 018 (3 discs); CD (1996) Deutsche Grammophon Archiv 447 703-2 (2 CDs)		
1978	Philippe Huttenlocher; Dietlinde Turban; Trudeliese Schmidt; Glenys Linos (Messenger and Proserpina)	Monteverdi Ensemble der Zürcher Oper; Nikolaus Harnoncourt	CD (1989): Teldec 8 35807 (part of Zürich Monteverdi Cycle, 6 CDS)		
1980	Joachim Seipp; Melinda Liebermann; Rosemarie Bühler; Heide Blanca-Roeser; Rochelle Travis	Bad Hersfeld Festival 1980; Siegfried Heinrich	LP (1982): Jubilate JU 85810-2 (3 discs)		
1983	Nigel Rogers; Patrizia Kwella; Emma Kirkby; Guillemette Laurens; Jennifer Smith	London Baroque Ensemble, London Cornett and Sackbut Ensemble; Charles Medlam	LP (1985): EMI EX 2701313 {3 discs} CD (1986) EMI 7 47142-8 {2 CDs}	Later CD issues in 1994 (EMI) and 2005 (Virgin)	
1985	Gino Quilico; Audrey Michael; Colette Alliot-Lugaz; Carolyn Watkinson; Danièle Borst	Opéra National de Lyon; Michel Corboz	LP (1985): Erato 75212 {2 discs} CD (1985) Erato 88133 {2 CDs}	Recorded from film soundtrack	
1986	Anthony Rolfe-Johnson; Julianne Baird; Lynne Dawson; Anne Sofie von Otter; Diana Montague	English Baroque Soloists, Monteverdi Choir; John Eliot Gardiner	LP (1987): Deutsche Grammophon; Archiv Produktion 419 250-1 (2 discs); CD 919870 DG Archiv Produktion 419 250-2 {2 CDs}		
1991	John Mark Ainsley; Julia Gooding; Catherine Bott (La musica, Messenger, Proserpina)	New London Consort; Philip Pickett	CD (1993): Decca L'Oiseau Lyre 433 545-2 {2 CDs}		
1993	Jeffrey Thomas; Dana Hanchard (Euridice and La musica); Jennifer Lane; Jessica Tanzillo	Art of the Early Keyboard; Gwendolyn Toth	CD (1996): Lyrichord LEMS 9002 {2 CDs}		
1995	Laurence Dale; Efrat Ben-Nun (Euridice and La musica); Jennifer Larmore; Bernarda Fink	Concerto Vocale; René Jacobs	CD (1995): Harmonia Mundi 901 553.54 (2 CDs)		
1996	Alessandro Carmignani; Marinella Pannicchi (Euridice and La musica); Rosita Frisani (Messenger and Proserpina)	Capella Musicale di San Petronio di Bologna; Sergio Vartolo	CD (1998): Naxos 8.554094-95 {2 CDs}		
1996	Victor Torres; Adriana Fernández; María Cristina Kiehr; Gloria Banditelli; Roberta Invernizzi	Ensemble Elyma; Gabriel Garrido	CD (1996): K617 K617066 {2 CDs}	Reissued by K617 in 2007	
2000	Gareth Morell; Sandra Simon (Euridice and La musica); Meredith Hall (Messenger and Proserpina)	Apollo's Fire; Jeannette Sorrell	CD (2001): Eclectra ECCD 2052 {2 CDs}	Sung in English	
2003	Ian Bostridge; Patrizia Ciofi; Natalie Dessay; Alice Coote; Véronique Gens	Le Concert d'Astrée; Emmanuelle Haïm	CD (2004): Virgin Classics 5 45642-2 {2 CDs}		
2004	Kobie van Rensburg; Cyrille Gerstenhaber; Estelle Kaïque (Messenger); Delphine Gillot (Proserpina)	La Grande Ecurie et la Chambre du Roy; Jean-Claude Malgoire	CD (2005): Dynamic DYNCDS 477 {2 CDs}	Recording of a live performance at Tourcoing in October 2004. The role of La musica was shared between three singers.	
2006	William Matteuzzi; Sylva Pozzer (Euridice and La musica); Sara Mingardo (Messenger and Proserpina)	Ensemble Instrumental; Sergio Vartolo	CD (2006) Brilliant Classics 93103 {2 CDs}		
2006	Mirko Guadagnini; Emanuela Galli (Euridice and La musica); Marina De Liso; Christina Calzolari	La Venexiana; Claudio Cavina	CD (2007): Glossa GLO 920913 {2 CDs}	Recorded in the Iglesia di San Carlo, Modena, February 2006	
2006	Frank Kelley; Roberta Anderson; Laurie Monahan (La musica and Messenger); Sharon Baker	Aston Magna; Daniel Stepner	CD (2008): Centaur Records 2931/2 {2 CDs}		
2007	Furio Zanasi; Anna Simboli (Eurydice and Prosperina); Monica Piccinini; Sara Mingardo	Concerto Italiano; Rinaldo Alessandrini	CD (2007): Naïve OP 30439 {2 CDs}		
2013	Charles Daniels; Faye Newton; David Hurley; Emily Van Evera (Messenger and Proserpina)	Taverner Consort and Players, Andrew Parrott	CD (2013): Avie AV2278 {2 CDs}		
2020	Emiliano Gonzalez Toro, Emőke Baráth, Emőke Baráth, Natalie Pérez, Mathilde Etienne	Ensemble Vocal de Poche; I Gemelli, Emiliano Gonzalez Toro	CD (2020): Naïve V 7176 {2 CDs}	Recorded 2–10 January, Corum, Montpellier	
2021	Leonardo De Lisi, Erica Alberini, Martha Rook, Michela Mazzanti, Martha Rook	Federico Bardazzi; Ensemble San Felice	CD (2021) Bongiovanni (2 CDs)		

== Video ==
Year of recording	Cast Orfeo; Euridice; La musica; Messenger; Proserpina	Opera house/Orchestra Conductor	Label and year of issue	Notes	Refs
1978	Philippe Huttenlocher; Dietlinde Turban; Trudeliese Schmidt; Glenys Linos (Messenger and Proserpina)	Monteverdi Ensemble der Zürcher Oper; Nikolaus Harnoncourt	DVD (2007): Deutsche Grammophon 073 4163	Originally performed as a television film. Also issued on DVD as part of a 3-opera set, DG Unitel 073 4278 (5 DVDs)	
1997	John Mark Ainsley; Juanita Lascarro; David Cordier; Brigitte Balleys; Bernarda Fink	Concerto Palatino, Tragicomedia; Stephen Stubbs	DVD (2005): Opus Arte OA 0928 (Europe); Opus Arte OA 0929 (USA)	Recording of a performance by De Nederlandse Opera Amsterdam, September 1997 (stage direction: Pierre Audi)	
1998	Simon Keenlyside; Juanita Lascarro (Euridice and La musica); Graciela Oddone; Martina Dike	Concerto Vocale, Collegium Vocale Gent; René Jacobs	DVD (2006) Harmonia Mundi France HMD 9909003/04	Recording of a performance at the Théâtre Royal de la Monnaie, 21 May 1998.	
2002	Furio Zanasi; Arianna Savall; Montserrat Figueras; Sara Mingardo; Adriana Fernández	Le Concert des Nations; Jordi Savall	DVD (2002): BBC/Opus Arte OA 0842D	Recording of a performance in the Gran Teatre del Liceu, 31 January 2002	
2004	Kobie van Rensburg; Cyrille Gerstenhaber; Estelle Kaïque (Messenger); Delphine Gillot (Proserpina)	La Grande Ecurie et la Chambre du Roy; Jean-Claude Malgoire	DVD (2005): Dynamic 33477	Recording of a live performance at Tourcoing in October 2004. The role of La musica was shared between three singers.	
2008	Dietrich Henschel; Maria Grazia Schiavo (Euridice, La musica and Prosperina); Sonia Prina	Les Arts Florissants - Les Sacqueboutiers; William Christie	DVD (2009): Dynamic 33598	Live performance, Teatro Real, Madrid, May 2008	
2009	Georg Nigl; Roberta Invernizzi (Euridice and La musica); Sara Mingardo; Raffaella Milanesi	Teatro alla Scala, Rinaldo Alessandrini	Blu-ray (2011): Opus Arte	Live performance, Milan, 21, 23 September 2009. Stage director: Robert Wilson	
2017	Cyril Auvity; Hannah Morrison (Euridice and La musica); Lea Desandre; Miriam Allan	Les Arts Florissants, Paul Agnew	Blu-ray (2017): Harmonia Mundi	Live performance, Théâtre de Caen, 28 February 2017. Stage director: Paul Agnew	
