= Carolyn Sampson =

English soprano

Carolyn Margaret Sampson OBE (born 18 May 1974) is an English soprano in opera and concert. Specialising in historically informed performance, she has sung in Masaaki Suzuki's recording project of Bach cantatas and has appeared at the English National Opera.

== Career ==
Born in Bedford, she studied music at the Birmingham University. During her studies, she performed as a member of the choir Ex Cathedra, winning an Arnold Goldsbrough Prize for Baroque music. She made her operatic debut singing the part of Amore in Monteverdi's L'incoronazione di Poppea at the English National Opera. In 2006 she performed in Montpellier, both as Susanna in Mozart's Le nozze di Figaro and as Adina in Donizetti's L'elisir d'amore. Sampson sang the title role in the Boston Early Music Festival's production of Lully's Psyché in June 2007. Jeremy Eichler of the Boston Globe wrote that she "gave a radiant and pure-voiced performance". The opera was subsequently recorded, and received a nomination for the Grammy Award for Best Opera Recording in December 2008.

Sampson has performed as a concert soloist in sacred oratorios such as Bach's St Matthew Passion with The English Concert conducted by Trevor Pinnock and Haydn's Schöpfung with the London Mozart Players. In January 2010, she appeared at the Gewandhaus in Bach's Christmas Oratorio, conducted by Riccardo Chailly. She has also sung with the NDR Radiophilharmonie, the Rundfunk-Sinfonieorchester Berlin and the Freiburger Barockorchester.

Sampson was appointed Officer of the Order of the British Empire (OBE) in the 2024 New Year Honours for services to music.

== Recording ==
In 2005, Sampson was the first to record all twelve stanzas of Bach's aria Alles mit Gott und nichts ohn' ihn, BWV 1127, discovered in 2005. She recorded it, conducted by Masaaki Suzuki, together with Bach's popular cantata for soprano and trumpet Jauchzet Gott in allen Landen, BWV 51.

In 2007, she recorded with Suzuki Bach's Mass in B minor, with Rachel Nicholls, Robin Blaze, Gerd Türk and Peter Kooy. A review noted: "The soloists are uniformly strong, and are major names in Bach performance. Carolyn Sampson leads the sopranos with a tone at once rich but still pure".

In 2010, she was the soprano soloist in a recording of Bach's Weihnachts-Oratorium with the Dresdner Kammerchor and the Gewandhausorchester, conducted by Riccardo Chailly, with Wiebke Lehmkuhl (alto), Martin Lattke (tenor) as the Evangelist, Wolfram Lattke (tenor) and Konstantin Wolff (bass).

Her recording A French Baroque Diva, music written for the soprano Marie Fel and recorded with Ex Cathedra conducted by Jeffrey Skidmore, won a Gramophone Award 2015 (Recital category). The review noted "the longer we listen to Sampson's voice, the more she seems to inhabit the aura of Fel, clearly a skilled and charismatic yet deeply affecting performer".

== Selected recordings ==
- Jan Dismas Zelenka: Sacred Music Hyperion 2002
- Jean Philippe Rameau: Règne Amour. Love songs from opera Hyperion 2003
- J.S. Bach: Secular Cantatas Vol. 1 (BWV 210, BWV 211) BIS 2003
- J.S. Bach: Cantatas Vol. 30 (Jauchzet Gott in allen Landen, BWV 51, Alles mit Gott, nichts ohn' ihn, BWV 1127), BIS 2005
- J.S. Bach: Cantatas Vol. 34 (BWV 1, BWV 127), BIS 2005
- Purcell: The Fairy-Queen Arts Blue 2005
- Mozart: Exsultate, jubilate Hyperion 2005
- George Frideric Handel: Duets from the Great English Oratorios BIS Records 2006
- Handel: Ode for St. Cecilia's Day Hyperion 2006
- Handel: Neun deutsche Arien Hyperion 2006
- J.S. Bach: Cantatas Vol. 38 (BWV 52, BWV 58), BIS 2006
- J.S. Bach: Cantatas Vol. 39 (BWV 28, BWV 68, BWV 85, BWV 183), BIS 2007
- Handel: Solomon Harmonia Mundi 2007
- Purcell: Victorious Love BIS 2007
- Cantatas, Vol. 41 BWV 84, BIS 2008
- Jean-Baptiste Lully: Psyché CPO 2008
- Handel: Parnasso in festa HWV 73
- Bach: Weihnachts-Oratorium (with Chailly), Decca 2010
- Thomas-Louis Bourgeois: Cantates, Carus 2012
- A French Baroque Diva Hyperion 2014
- Carolyn Sampson - Fleurs BIS 2015
- J.S. Bach: Secular Cantatas Vol. 6 (BWV 1083) BIS 2016
- A Verlaine Songbook BIS 2016
- Mozart: Great Mass in C minor BIS 2016
- J.S. Bach: Cantatas for Soprano Vol. 6 (BWV 199, BMV 152, BMV 202) Harmonia Mundi 2017
- Lost is My Quiet - Duets and Solo Songs BIS 2017
- Carolyn Sampson - A Soprano’s Schubertiade BIS 2018
- The Contrast - English Poetry in Song BIS 2019
