= Folks & Tales =

Album by Ensemble amarcord

Studio album by Amarcord Ensemble
- Released: 2013
- Genre: Folk
- Label: Raumklang

Amarcord Ensemble chronology
Amarcord - Coming Home For Christmas (2011)	Folks & Tales (2013)	Amarcord Ensemble - The Book of Madrigals, DVD (2014)

Folks & Tales is an album of folk songs from around the world by the German vocal group Amarcord Ensemble. It was released in 2013 on Raumklang.

== Track list ==
1. Es klappert die Mühle am rauschenden Bach (de)
2. Nine hundred miles away from home
3. No poth reposare
4. Smedsvisa
5. The Last Rose of Summer
6. Waltzing Matilda – Australia
7. Arirang – Korea
8. Pen-pen de Sarapen – Tagalog song
9. Da N'ase – Ghana
10. Cockles and Mussels
11. Habanera Tú
12. Sakura Sakura
13. Lom Nao (ລົມໜາວ) – Lao "wind of winter"
14. Wa Kusnitze (Во кузнице) – Russia
15. Červená Růžičko – Czech
16. Hava Nagila – Hebrew
17. Pūt, Vējiņi (lv) – Latvia "Blow Ye Wind!"
