= International Festival for Vocal Music "a cappella" =

International Festival for Vocal Music "a cappella" is an international music festival for a cappella music held annually in Leipzig, Germany. It was founded by the ensemble amarcord.

== Ensembles ==
Name	Festival year
ensemble amarcord (Germany)	1997-2010
Anchiskhati Choir (Georgia)	2010
Anonymous 4 (USA)	2010
Aquabella (Germany)	2004
Banchieri Singers (Hungary)	1997, 2007
baSix (Denmark)	2007
Basta (Germany)	2003, 2007
Calmus Ensemble (Germany)	2003, 2004
Camerata (Belarus)	2005
Capilla Flamenca (Belgium)	2007
Chanticleer (USA)	1999
The Clerks' Group (United Kingdom)	2004
Club For Five (Finland)	2008
Cosmos (Latvia)	2006
Cuncordu e Tenore de Orosei (Italy)	2004
Das Leipziger Saxtett (Germany)	1997
Die Singphoniker (Germany)	2003
Die Weimarer Hofsänger (Germany)	1999
Divinas (Germany)	2006
Ensemble Clément Janequin (France)	2003, 2009
Ensemble Planeta (Japan)	2008
Ensemble Tavagna (France)	2006
Ensemble Vocalphonie (Germany)	2006
Eva Quartet (Bulgaria)	2005, 2009
Gelato Misto Musicale (Switzerland)	1997
Gothic Voices (United Kingdom)	2006
Grupo Vocal Olisipo (Portugal)	1997
The Hilliard Ensemble (United Kingdom)	2001, 2008
The House Jacks (USA)	2009
Huelgas Ensemble (Belgium)	2003
Huun-Huur-Tu (Tuva)	2001
I Fagiolini (United Kingdom)	2008
The Idea Of North (Australia)	2006, 2009
Insingizi (Zimbabwe)	2003
Intermezzo (Netherlands)	2004
Jazzation (Hungary)	2010
King's Singers (United Kingdom)	1999, 2010
Klangbezirk (Germany)	2008
Lajuna (Germany)	2006
La Venexiana (Italy)	2006
Maybebop (Germany)	2004
m-pact (USA)	2008
Modell Andante (Germany)	1999
Niniwe (Germany)	2004, 2005
Obertonchor Düsseldorf (Germany)	2006
Ommm (France)	2010
Orlando Consort (United Kingdom)	2005
Pussy De Luxe (Germany)	2006
Rajaton (Finland)	2004
The Real Group (Sweden)	2004, 2007
Remake (Russia)	2001
Riltons Vänner (Sweden)	2010
Rockapella (USA)	2010
Schola Gregoriana Pragensis (Czech Republic)	2005
Sheikh Arabi Farag Ensemble (Egypt)	2007
Singer Pur (Germany)	2007
Sound Affaire (Germany)	2008
Stouxsingers (Germany)	2005
Tailed Comedians (Germany)	2005
Take 6 (USA)	2009
Tamae (Madagascar)	2003
Tam'Echo'Tam (Belgium)	2001
Swingle Singers (United Kingdom)	2003
Trio Mediaeval (Norway)	1999, 2009
U-Bahn Kontrollöre in tiefgefrorenen Frauenkleidern (Germany)	2006
Viva Voce (Germany)	2005, 2006
Vocado (Sweden)	2009
Vocal Divas (Cuba)	2001
The Vocal Octet (Israel)	2008
Vocal Sampling (Cuba)	2005
