= Lautten Compagney =

Early music ensemble, based in Berlin

lautten compagney BERLIN
- Early music ensemble
- Founded: 1984 by Hans-Werner Apel and Wolfgang Katschner
- Location: Berlin
- Principal conductor: Wolfgang Katschner
- Website: www.lauttencompagney.de

lautten compagney BERLIN is a German instrumental ensemble based in Berlin. Founded in 1984 by Hans-Werner Apel and Wolfgang Katschner, now the principal conductor, it specializes in early music and Baroque music, notably the operas of Handel.

== Music ==
lautten compagney BERLIN was founded in 1984 as a lute duo by lutenists Hans-Werner Apel and Wolfgang Katschner. The ensemble grew and plays in varied formation, specialising in Early music and Baroque music, notably the operas of Handel. Katschner is the principal conductor, Apel plays in the continuo group. The group runs the festival, AEQUINOX, in Neuruppin.

The ensemble has frequently played choral works in concert and recording, collaborating with notable singers and ensembles. In varied formation from chamber ensemble to opera orchestra, they performed with vocal ensemble Capella Angelica, also founded by Katschner, and the Sing-Akademie zu Berlin, works including Handel's Der Messias and Bach's Passions. In 2007 they recorded cantatas by Dieterich Buxtehude. In 2010 they performed Bach's Köthener Trauermusik in the reconstruction by Alexander Grychtolik in the Sophienkirche Berlin. In 2011, they played Handel's opera Rinaldo, 300 years after its premiere, with Valer Barna-Sabadus in the title role. In 2012 they performed Handel's oratorio La resurrezione, staged by Kobie van Rensburg, and Bach's Christmas Oratorio. For the Rheingau Musik Festival's annual Marienvesper at Eberbach Abbey, they performed Monteverdi's Vespers in 2013 with ensemble amarcord and five additional guest singers.

In December 2015 the European Broadcasting Union included the lautten compagney BERLIN in its annual Christmas radio programme, which is broadcast across various European countries. The group played a selection of music from the Bach cantatas in instrumental arrangements.

== Awards ==
lautten compagney BERLIN won an ECHO Klassik award in 2010 in the category Ensemble – Alte Musik. They were awarded the Rheingau Musik Preis in 2012.

== Selected discography ==
- Time Zones, Satie – Scheidt. Deutsche Harmonia Mundi, 2020
- Bach – Die Motetten. Deutsche Harmonia Mundi, 2012
- Handel with Care, instrumental arrangements of arias by Handel. Deutsche Harmonia Mundi, 2012
- Timeless, music by Tarquinio Merula and Philip Glass. Deutsche Harmonia Mundi, 2009
- Heinrich Schütz: Weihnachtshistorie and works by Dieterich Buxtehude, Johann Philipp Krieger, Johann Theile, Susanne Rydén, Christoph Prégardien, Capella Angelica. Berlin Classics, 2007
- Handel: Der Messias, German version by Johann Gottfried Herder (1780). Sharon Rostorf-Zamir, Maria Riccarda Wesseling, Kobie van Rensburg, Raimund Nolte, Dresdner Kammerchor. Deutsche Harmonia Mundi 2007
- Dieterich Buxtehude: Cantatas II, Capella Angelica. Carus-Verlag, 2007
- Buxtehude: Cantatas I, Barbara Christina Steude. Carus-Verlag, 2007
- Buxtehude: Membra Jesu Nostri, Capella Angelica. Raumklang, 2006
- Carissimi: Dixit Dominus, Judicium Extremum. Capella Angelica. Coviello Classics, 2006

Artist recitals

- Henry Purcell: Love's Madness. Dorothee Mields, Carus Verlag, 2012
- Henry Purcell: Love Songs. Dorothee Mields, Carus Verlag, 2010
- Handel: La Diva – Arias for Cuzzoni, Simone Kermes. Berlin Classics
- Il pianto d'Orfeo, Kobie van Rensburg, New Classical Adventure 2006
- Mia Vita, Mio Bene, Ann Hallenberg and Ditte Andersen Berlin Classics, 2006
- Handel arias, Maria Ricarda Wesseling, Claves Records, 2005
- My personal Handel collection, Lynne Dawson, Berlin Classics, 2003
- Dolce mio ben, arias by Gasparini, Conti, Magini, Pistocchi, Sarri. Maite Beaumont, Berlin 2003
- Songs of an English cavalier, works by John Dowland, Thomas Campion, Henry Lawes, John Blow, Henry Purcell. Kobie van Rensburg, New Classical Adventure, 2001
- Handel's Beard, Kobie van Rensburg, New Classical Adventure, 2001
- Johann Philipp Krieger: Lieben und geliebt werden Arias, Mona Spägele, Wilfried Jochens, Wolf Matthias Friedrich, New Classical Adventure, 1995
