= Dorothee Mields =

German opera singer

- Born: 15 April 1971 (age 55); Gelsenkirchen
- Other names: Dorothee Blotzky-Mields
- Education: University of the Arts Bremen
- Occupation: Classical soprano

Dorothee Mields (born 15 April 1971) is a German soprano concert singer of Baroque and contemporary music. She performed in world premieres including Johannes Maria Staud's opera Berenice at the Munich Biennale, Beat Furrer's Invocation III conducted by the composer, Gérard Grisey's final work Quatre Chants pour franchir le seuil, and the Requiem composition Schwarz vor Augen und es ward Licht by Harald Weiss.

== Career ==
Mields was born in Gelsenkirchen. She studied at the University of the Arts Bremen with Elke Holzmann, Harry van der Kamp and Gabriele Schreckenbach. After graduation she continued studying in Stuttgart with Julia Hamari.

=== Baroque music ===
With the Collegium Vocale Gent and Philippe Herreweghe she recorded several Bach cantatas, his Magnificat in E-flat major, BWV 243a, Easter Oratorio and Ascension Oratorio. In 2001 she recorded Joseph Schuster's opera Demofoonte on a libretto of Metastasio with La Ciaccona, conducted by Ludger Rémy.

In 2002 she recorded several cantatas for Pentecost by Gottfried Heinrich Stölzel, a prolific contemporary of Bach, conducted by Rémy. The soloists, including Jan Kobow, also formed the choir. In January 2003 she sang Monteverdi’s Vespro della Beata Vergine on a tour with the Collegium Vocale Gent. In 2006 she performed in Bach's St John Passion with the Tafelmusik Baroque Orchestra in Canada. She sang the soprano part in the recording of Bach's Mass in B minor with Jos van Veldhoven. She recorded songs of John Dowland with the gambist Hille Perl in 2008, and Love Songs of Henry Purcell with the Lautten Compagney Berlin. She was soprano soloist for two concerts of the Bachchor Mainz reviving church cantatas of Wilhelm Friedemann Bach in June 2010, remembering the composers birth in 1710. In 2016 she performed an evening of English Mad Songs, by Purcell and his contemporaries, with the Lautten Compagney at Eberbach Abbey as part of the Rheingau Musik Festival.

=== Contemporary music ===
In 2004 she sappeared in the title role in the world premiere of Johannes Maria Staud's opera Berenice at the Munich Biennale. She premiered Beat Furrer's Invocation III (the third scene of invocation) for soprano and ensemble on texts from the 16th century on 17 September 2004, in Innsbruck, with the Klangforum Wien conducted by the composer. In 2006 she sang Gérard Grisey's final work Quatre Chants pour franchir le seuil with the Klangforum Wien and Simone Young in Hamburg. She performed the solo of Mahler's Symphony No. 4 with the Orchestre des Champs-Élysées conducted by Herreweghe. Her debut at the Salzburg Festival in 2007 was again Grisey's Quatre Chants, conducted by Emilio Pomárico. In 2009 Mields and Andreas Karasiak were the soloists in the requiem composition Schwarz vor Augen und es ward Licht by Harald Weiss dedicated to the Knabenchor Hannover, premiered on 31 October 2009, with the North German Radio Symphony Orchestra.

=== Festivals ===
Mields has performed at international festivals, including Bachwoche Ansbach, the Bach Festival of Köthen, the Bachfest Leipzig, the Handel Festival, Halle, and the Handel Festival, Göttingen, the Suntory Music Foundation Festival, the Boston Early Music Festival, the Tanglewood Music Festival, the Music Festival of Bremen, the Vienna Festival Weeks, and the Flanders Festival in Bruges. At the Tanglewood Festival she performed Bach's Mass in B minor in 2007 with the Netherlands Bach Society.

Mields has been a teacher at the Hochschule für Musik "Franz Liszt", Weimar.

== Recordings ==
- Purcell Love Songs Dorothee Mields, Wolfgang Katschner, Lautten Compagney Berlin. Carus Verlag.
- Purcell Love's Madness Dorothee Mields, Katschner, Lautten Compagney Berlin. Carus.
- Sacred Arias German baroque cantatas. Dorothee Mields, Concerto Melante
- Birds Dorothee Mields, Stefan Temmingh (recorder), L'Orfeo Barockorchester, The Gentleman's Brand. Baroque bird songs by Handel, Torri, Arne, Keiser, Bartlet, and others. dhm. February 2015
- Telemann. Hoffnung des Widersehens Dorothee Mields, soprano. Michi Gaigg, L'Orfeo Barockorchester. dhm. September 2012
- Stölzel, Cantatas for Pentecost 1737, Telemannisches Collegium Michaelstein (2002)
