= Rachel Nicholls =

British soprano

- Born: Bedford, England
- Education: Royal College of Music
- Occupations: Soprano; Academic teacher
- Organizations: The Royal Opera; University of York; University of Huddersfield
- Website: www.rachelnicholls.com

Rachel Nicholls is an English soprano in opera and concert.

== Career ==
Born in Bedford, England, Nicholls studied French at the University of York, and from 1998 voice at the Royal College of Music with Kathleen Livingstone. In 2001, she won second prize at the Kathleen Ferrier Memorial Competition. She first became known for her work in Early Music but later became a Dramatic Soprano specialising in Wagner. She has collaborated with conductors such as Martyn Brabbins, Sylvain Cambreling, Andrew Davis, Colin Davis, Alexander Frey, John Eliot Gardiner, Daniele Gatti, Valery Gergiev, Richard Hickox, Jean-Claude Malgoire and Simon Rattle, and with orchestras such as the Academy of St Martin in the Fields, BBC Symphony Orchestra, Britten Sinfonia, City of Birmingham Symphony Orchestra, La Grande Écurie et la Chambre du Roy, the Orchestra of the Age of Enlightenment and the Philharmonia Orchestra. She is Head of Voice at the University of Huddersfield, a visiting performance coach at the University of York, and a visiting professor at the Royal Scottish Conservatoire. Nicholls now studies with the Wagnerian soprano Dame Anne Evans.

=== Opera ===
Nicholls made her debut with The Royal Opera in London as the Third Flowermaiden in Wagner's Parsifal. She returned to Covent Garden to sing Prilepa in Tchaikowsky's Queen of Spades, Pepik in Janáček's The Cunning Little Vixen and Echo in Strauss's Ariadne auf Naxos. For English Touring Opera she performed the title role of Francesco Cavalli's Erismena, Elisa in Handel's Tolomeo, and Ginevra in Handel's Ariodante. She sang Armida in Handel's Rinaldo at the Edinburgh Festival and Fiordilligi in Mozart's Così fan tutte for La Grande Écurie et la Chambre du Roy conducted by Jean-Claude Malgoire. She performed First Woman – First Fury in Birtwhistle's The Mask of Orpheus: The Arches at the BBC Proms, Nerone in Monteverdi's L'incoronazione di Poppea at the New Theatre, Tokyo, Tatyana in Tchaikowsky's Eugene Onegin for Scottish Opera, Jenifer in Tippett's The Midsummer Marriage, Sieglinde in Wagner's Die Walküre and Anne Trulove in Stravinsky's The Rake's Progress at the St Endellion Festival. In 2012, she performed the part of Brünnhilde in Wagner's Ring cycle at the Longborough Festival Opera. Fiona Maddocks reviewed Götterdämmerung in The Observer: "Longborough has found a magnificent Brünnhilde in Rachel Nicholls, a singer so versatile that she has also had a career as a Bach specialist. Full-toned, flexible, accurate and powerful, every gesture, every flinch is persuasive." Nicholls performed her first Isolde in Tristan und Isolde at Longborough Festival Opera in 2015 and shortly afterwards in concert in Tokyo with Yomniuri Nippon Symphony Orchestra conducted by Sylvain Cambreling. In 2016 she performed the role in Paris, the Teatro dell’Opera di Roma, the Badisches Staatstheater Karlsruhe, Oper Stuttgart and at Grange Park Opera. In 2017 she sang Isolde for the São Paulo Symphony Orchestra and at the Teatro Regio di Torino. Nicholls made her role debut as Elektra in Basel in 2018 and went on to perform Elektra in Karlsruhe in 2019.

=== Concert ===
Nicholls has performed with Academy of St Martin in the Fields, the BBC Symphony Orchestra, the Bochum Symphony Orchestra, the Brighton Philharmonic Orchestra, the Britten Sinfonia, the City of Birmingham Symphony Orchestra, the Darmstadt Hofkapelle, Florilegium, the Gdansk Music Festival, the Hanover Band, Huddersfield Choral Society, the London Handel Players, the London Mozart Players, the London Philharmonic Orchestra, the Mikkeli City Orchestra, the Orchestra of St John’s, the Orchestra of the Age of Enlightenment, Le Parlement de Musique, the Philharmonia Orchestra, the Royal Scottish National Orchestra and the Scottish Chamber Orchestra, as well as at the Brighton, Chelsea, Fishguard, London Handel and Three Choirs Festivals. She has appeared in both the Valparaiso University and Carnegie Hall, New York, in Bach's Mass in B minor, performed by the Bach Collegium Japan, conducted by Masaaki Suzuki, commemorating the Fukushima disaster.

== Recordings ==
Nicholls has performed in the field of historically informed performance in recordings conducted by Suzuki of Bach's cantatas, including the cantata Liebster Jesu, mein Verlangen, BWV 32, acting as the Soul in dialogue with Jesus, which ends "with the two voices together in a gavotte, a clear Lutheran analogy to a love duet". In a 2007 recording of Bach's Mass in B minor, conducted by Suzuki, she appears with Carolyn Sampson, Robin Blaze, Gerd Türk and Peter Kooy.
