= Banchieri =

Banchieri (pronounced [baŋˈkjɛːri]) is an Italian surname. Notable people with the surname include:

- Adriano Banchieri (1568–1634), Italian composer, music theorist, organist, and poet
- Antonio Banchieri (1667–1733), Italian cardinal
- Mauricio Banchieri (born 1972), Chilean businessman and entrepreneur

== See also ==
- Banchero
