= Maybebop =

German male a cappella quartet

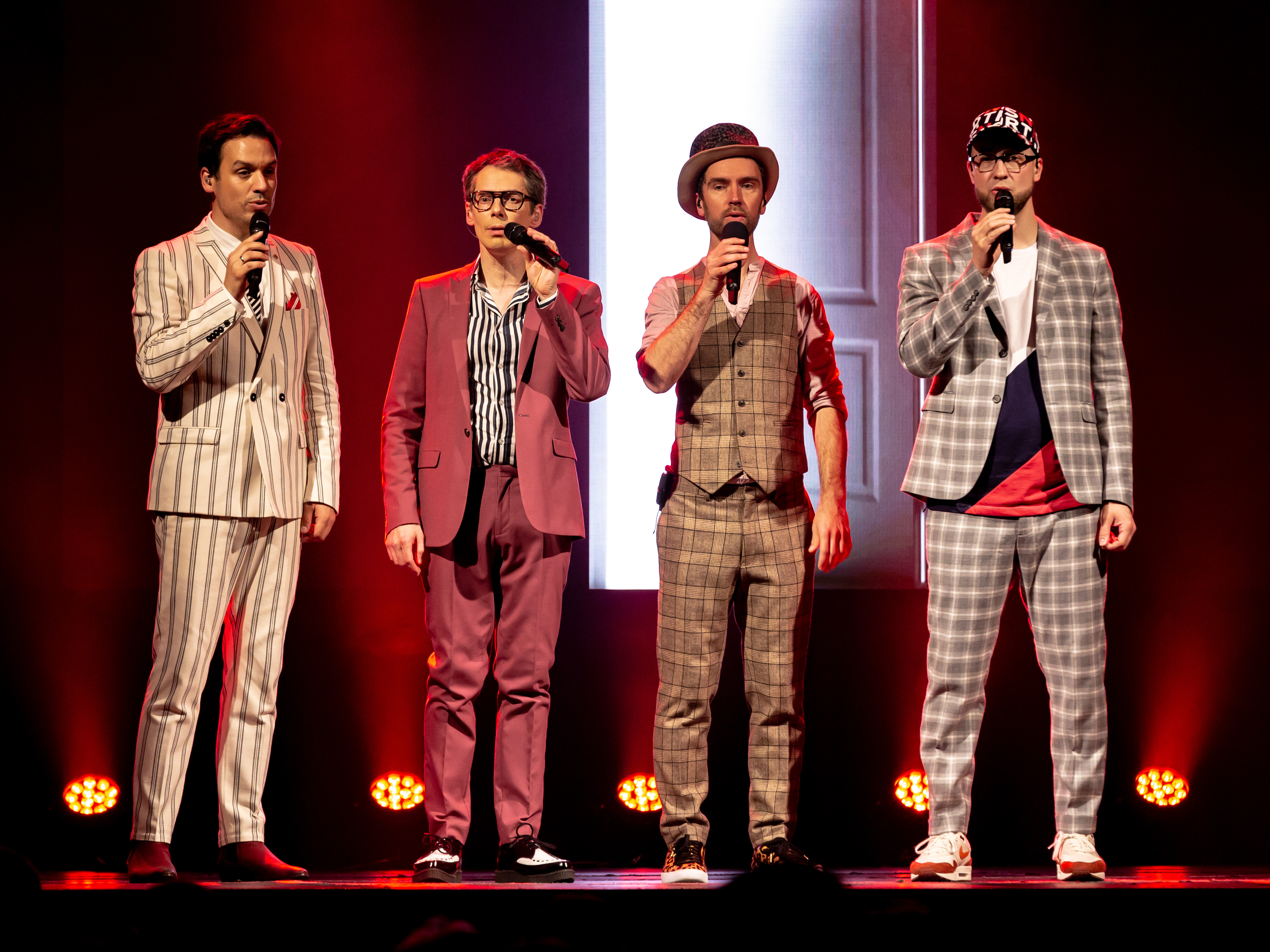

Background information
- Origin: Hanover, Germany
- Genres: Jazz; rock; pop; bebop
- Years active: 1992–present
- Members: Jan Bürger (joined 1999); Lukas Teske (joined 2002); Oliver Gies (founding member); Christoph Hiller (joined 2018)
- Past members: Bernd Clausen (1992–1993); Jens Pape (1993–1997); Cem Arnold Süzer (1997–1999); Nils Ole Peters (1992–2001); Eiko Saathoff (2001–2002); Markus Jaursch (- 2002); Sebastian Schröder (2002-2018)
- Website: http://maybebop.de

Maybebop is a German male a cappella quartet consisting of founding member Oliver Gies, Jan Malte Bürger, Lukas Teske and Christoph Hiller. The group sings predominantly German-language self-compositions, although it has released cover versions of rock hits such as "Nothing Else Matters", "Smells Like Teen Spirit" and "Bohemian Rhapsody". In addition, the group has released jazz adaptations of folk and Christmas songs like "Abendlied", "Die Gedanken sind frei" and "Still, still, still".

== Band members ==
=== Oliver Gies ===
Oliver Gies (born 30 May 1973 in Walsrode) studied mathematics and music with an emphasis on singing and completed his studies with a major in composition and arrangement. Gies lives with his family in Hanover.

He sings baritone and is the only founding member who is still part of the group. As Maybebop's artistic director, he writes most of the compositions and arrangements. Outside of Maybebop, Gies gives choral workshops and writes a cappella music for other groups, as well as writing theatre music.

=== Jan Malte Bürger ===
Jan Malte Bürger (born 8 May 1979 in Göttingen) had vocal training from a young age in the Göttingen Boys' Choir. After completing his Abitur, he worked in a call-centre and studied singing privately. Jan Malte Bürger currently lives with his family in Hamburg.

He joined Maybebop in 1999 as a countertenor, succeeding Cem Arnold Süzer.

=== Lukas Teske ===
Lukas Herbert Helmut Teske (born 16 February 1980 in Halle) is the youngest member of Maybebop, and lives with his family in Berlin. Prior to joining the group in 2002, he was a member of the a cappella group MuSix. Teske sings tenor and mainly focuses on vocal percussion.

=== Sebastian Schröder ===
Heinrich Sebastian Schröder (born 19 September 1974 in Hanover) sings bass. Before joining Maybebop he played the violin, and he mainly focused on classical music. In 2020 he announced his departure from the band, after he had to be replaced by Christoph Hiller for quite some time for health reasons.

=== Christoph Hiller ===
For Sebastian Schröder a health-related concert break was planned from 2018 to 2021. As a substitute, the singer Christoph Johannes Hiller (* 18 October 1982 in Weißenfels) agreed to take over the bass voice at Maybebop and had to learn the entire program »Sistemfeler« within a few weeks as well as the Christmas program. On the new program »ziel:los« Hiller is also involved. His permanent takeover of the bass voice at Maybebop was announced by the band in September 2020.

== Awards ==
Maybebop have been among the finalists of some German music awards, such as the John Lennon Talent Award, Jugend Kulturell, New Talents and Winning Jazz. They won the Prix Pantheon audience prize in 2012.

The group have won the Contemporary A Cappella Recording Award multiple times. In 2006 their album Christmas won the award for best holiday album, and their single Let It Snow won the award for the best holiday song. In 2012 they were the runner-up for the award for the best jazz song, with their single Es Tanzt Ein Bebop-Butzemann. In 2013, their album German Verboten won the award for best European album, and their cover of Smells Like Teen Spirit won the award for best electronic/experimental song.

== Discography ==
=== Studio albums ===
- 1996: Leichte Kost (Voice Pop! Records)
- 1997: May be not Bop (Contrapunkt)
- 1999: Prima Pop! Live
- 2001: Auf die Ohren

In the current formation:

- 2003: Heiße Luft (Maratone)
- 2004: Weihnacht (Maratone)
- 2005: Immer für dich da!
- 2007: Superheld (EMI)
- 2008: Superheld Live (Roxxon Records)
- 2008: Schenken! (Traumton)
- 2009: Endlich authentisch (Traumton)
- 2009: Ende September (DVD, Traumton)
- 2011: Extrem nah dran (Traumton)
- 2011: Weihnachten Live (DVD, Traumton)
- 2012: Extrem nah dran Live (DVD, Traumton)
- 2012: Wie neu (Traumton)
- 2012: Monumental (Traumton)
- 2012: German verboten (only on iTunes)
- 2013: Weniger sind mehr (WMG)
- 2014: Weniger sind mehr Die Show (DVD, Traumton)
- 2015: Das darf man nicht (Ellenberger)
- 2015: Adventskalender im September (Ellenberger)
- 2015: Für Euch (Ellenberger)
- 2016: Das darf man nicht (Live) (Ellenberger)

=== Featured ===
- 2000: The Attack of the Dragon – A Tribute to Queen (Adrenaline Records): "Bohemian Rhapsody" and "Black Hole Sun"
- 2011: Voices Only Forte (Voices Only Productions): "Was uns verbindet"
- 2011: Wir sind sechsundneunzig Peppermint (Edel AG): "Kein Mann für eine Nacht"
- 2011: Sing 8: Too Cubed (CASA): "Witzig"
- 2012: A Cappella Best of: "Gute Nacht Freunde", "Schwarz oder weiß"
- 2012: Sing 9: Supernovem (CASA): "Smells Like Teen Spirit"
- 2012: Voices Only Forte II (Voices Only Productions): "Down on Me"
- 2014: Voices Only Forte III (Voices Only Productions): "Nimm mich mit"
- 2016: Voices Only Forte V (Voices Only Productions): "Ich seh Dich"
