= Marschner =

Marschner is a surname. Notable people with the surname include:

- Adolf Eduard Marschner (1819–1853), German composer
- Heinrich Marschner (1795–1861), German composer
- Kurt Marschner (1913–1984), German operatic tenor and actor
- Thorsten Marschner (born 1968), German high jumper
- Wolfgang Marschner (1926–2020), German violinist, teacher of violin, composer, and conductor
