= Kölner Akademie =

Die Kölner Akademie - Damals und Heute is a German baroque and classical music orchestra founded in 1996 and based in Cologne, Germany. It was founded in 1996 by the American conductor Michael Alexander Willens, who studied at the Juilliard School in New York and still leads the orchestra.

== Selected discography ==
For PENTATONE:

- J.S. Bach: Lutheran Masses BWV 233-236, PENTATONE, 2026

For Raumklang:

- Johann Valentin Meder: St. Matthew Passion, Kennedy, Merkel, Türk, Hilz, Kölner Akademie, Michael Alexander Willens, Raumklang

For Carus Records

- Johann Sebastian Bach: St Mark Passion, Dominique Horwitz (speaker), ensemble amarcord, Kölner Akademie, Michael Alexander Willens, Carus 2009

For BIS Classics:

- Mozart: Piano concertos No.9 K 271, No.12 K 414, Ronald Brautigam, fortepiano, Kölner Akademie, Michael Alexander Willens, BIS
- Mozart: Piano concertos N.24 K 495, No.25 K 503, Ronald Brautigam, fortepiano, Kölner Akademie, Michael Alexander Willens, BIS
- Mozart: Piano concertos N.17 K 453, No.26 K 537, Ronald Brautigam, fortepiano, Kölner Akademie, Michael Alexander Willens, BIS

For ARS Produktion:

- Bernhard Crusell: Clarinet concertos, Eric Hoeprich, clarinet, Kölner Akademie, Michael Alexander Willens, Forgotten Treasures Vol. 1, ARS-Produktion
- Franz Danzi: Bassoon concertos, Jane Gower, bassoon Kölner Akademie, Michael Alexander Willens, Forgotten Treasures Vol. 2, ARS-Produktion
- Viennese Double bass concertos, David Sinclair, double bass, Kölner Akademie, Michael Alexander Willens, Forgotten Treasures Vol. 3, ARS-Produktion
- Johann Wilhelm Wilms: Symphony and Concertos, Paolo Giacometti, Hammerklavier, Martin Sandhoff, flute, Kölner Akademie, Michael Alexander Willens, Forgotten Treasures Vol. 4, ARS-Produktion
- Bernhard Romberg: Symphonies, Kölner Akademie, Michael Alexander Willens Forgotten Treasures Vol. 5, ARS-Produktion
- Chant d’ Automne, French Horn music, Ulrich Hübner, natural and valvehorn, Kölner Akademie, Michael Alexander Willens, Forgotten Treasures Vol. 6, ARS-Produktion
- Johann Christian Fischer and Carl Stamitz Oboe concertos, Michael Niesemann, oboe, Kölner Akademie, Michael Alexander Willens, Forgotten Treasures Vol. 7, ARS-Produktion
- Sigismund Ritter von Neukomm: Early works, Marianne Beate Kielland (mezzo soprano); Riko Fukuda, Hammerklavier, Kölner Akademie, Michael Alexander Willens, Forgotten Treasures Vol. 8, ARS-Produktion
- Virtuoso Trumpet Music from the 19th Century, Robert Vanryne, keyed trumpet, Kölner Akademie, Michael Alexander Willens, Forgotten Treasures Vol. 9, ARS-Produktion
- 19th Century Harp concertos, Masumi Nagasawa, single pedal harp, Kölner Akademie, Michael Alexander Willens, Forgotten Treasures Vol. 10, ARS-Produktion

For CPO Records:

- Ferdinand Ries: Overtures, violin concerto and concerto for 2 horns, Anton Steck, Violin, Teunis van der Zwaart, Erwin Wieringa, natural horn, Kölner Akademie, Michael Alexander Willens, CPO
- Johann Wenzel Kalliwoda: Symphony No 2, Symphony No 4, Concert overture in f, Kölner Akademie, Michael Alexander Willens, CPO
- Anton Eberl: Piano concertos, Paolo Giacometti, Riko Fukuda, Hammerklavier, Kölner Akademie, Michael Alexander Willens, CPO
- Sigismund Ritter von Neukomm: Three Orchestral Fantasies, Sinfonie heroique, Kölner Akademie, Michael Alexander Willens, CPO
- Johann Wenzel Kalliwoda: Concert Overtures and Concertinos for Violin and Orchestra Ariadne Dastalakis, violin, Kölner Akademie, Michael Alexander Willens, CPO
- Johann Mattheson: Der Liebreiche und Geduldige David: Oratorio for Soloists, Choir and Orchestra, Kennedy, Eittinger, Ciolek, Hilz, Spogis, Kölner Akademie, Michael Alexander Willens, CPO
- Johann Mattheson: Das Größte Kind: Christmas Oratorio for Soloists, Choir and Orchestra, Rydén, Gramß, Schmid, Türk, Friedrich, Dahlmann, Kölner Akademie, Michael Alexander Willens, CPO
- Johann Mattheson: Die heilsame Geburt, Christmas Oratorio for Soloists, Choir and Orchestra: Kennedy, Crookes, Eitinger, Post, MacLeod, Kölner Akademie, Michael Alexander Willens, CPO
- Francesco Durante: Neapolitan music for Christmas, Mameli, Eittinger, Post, MacLeod, Kölner Akademie, Michael Alexander Willens, CPO
- Francesco Durante: Neapolitan music for Christmas II, Monica Piccinini, Christina Kühne, Ursula Eittinger, Alberto ter Doest, Kölner Akademie, Michael Alexander Willens, CPO
- Carl Heinrich Graun: Osteroratorium. Nina Koufochristou, Dagmar Saskova, Jan Kobow, Andreas Wolf, Kölner Akademie CPO
- Telemann: Lukas-Passion (1728) Marcus Ullmann, Wolfgang Klose, Christian Hilz, Raimonds Spogis. CPO
- forthcoming Händel: Chandos Anthems, Backus, Krasiak, Ciolek, Hilz, Kölner Akademie, Michael Alexander Willens, CPO
