= Banchero =

Banchero (pronounced [baŋˈkɛːro]) is an Italian surname. Notable people with the surname include:

- Angelo Banchero (1744–1793), Italian painter
- Chris Banchero (born 1989), American basketball player
- Elvio Banchero (1904–1982), Italian football player
- Luis Banchero Rossi (1929–1972), Peruvian businessman
- Paolo Banchero (born 2002), American basketball player
- Rhonda Banchero (née Smith; born 1973), American basketball player

== See also ==
- Banchieri
