= Wolfgang Katschner =

German lutenist and conductor

- Born: 1961 (age 64–65); Kyritz, Brandenburg, Germany
- Education: Academy of Music Hanns Eisler Berlin; University of Music and Performing Arts, Frankfurt am Main
- Occupations: Lutenist; Conductor

Wolfgang Katschner (born 1961 in Kyritz) is a German lutenist and conductor. He is director of the ensembles Capella Angelica and Lautten Compagney which specialise in Baroque music—notably the operas of Handel.

Katschner studied guitar at the Academy of Music Hanns Eisler Berlin and lute at the University of Music and Performing Arts, Frankfurt am Main.

The Lautten Compagney won the Rheingau Musik Preis in 2012. In 2013 they played the annual Marienvesper of the Rheingau Musik Festival at Eberbach Abbey, Monteverdi's Vespers with the ensemble amarcord and five guest singers.

Katschner also directed the Philip Glass Ensemble and the Lautten Compagney for several recordings of compositions by Philip Glass.

== Selected discography ==
For recordings with the Lautten Compagney, see there.

- Johann Philipp Krieger: Lieben und geliebt werden Arias, Mona Spägele, Wilfried Jochens, Wolf Matthias Friedrich, New Classical Adventure, 1995
- Songs of an English cavalier, works by John Dowland, Thomas Campion, Henry Lawes, John Blow, Henry Purcell. Kobie van Rensburg, New Classical Adventure, 2001
- Handel's Beard, Kobie van Rensburg, New Classical Adventure, 2001
- Dolce mio ben, arias by Gasparini, Conti, Magini, Pistocchi, Sarri. Maite Beaumont, Berlin 2003
- My personal Handel collection, Lynne Dawson, Berlin Classics, 2003
- Handel: La Diva - Arias for Cuzzoni, Simone Kermes. Berlin Classics
- Mia Vita, Mio Bene, Ann Hallenberg and Ditte Andersen Berlin Classics, 2006
- Handel arias, Maria Ricarda Wesseling, Claves Records, 2005
- Il pianto d'Orfeo, Kobie van Rensburg, New Classical Adventure 2006
- Henry Purcell: Love Songs. Dorothee Mields, Carus Verlag, 2010
- Henry Purcell: Love's Madness. Dorothee Mields, Carus Verlag, 2012
