= U-Bahn Kontrollöre in tiefgefrorenen Frauenkleidern =

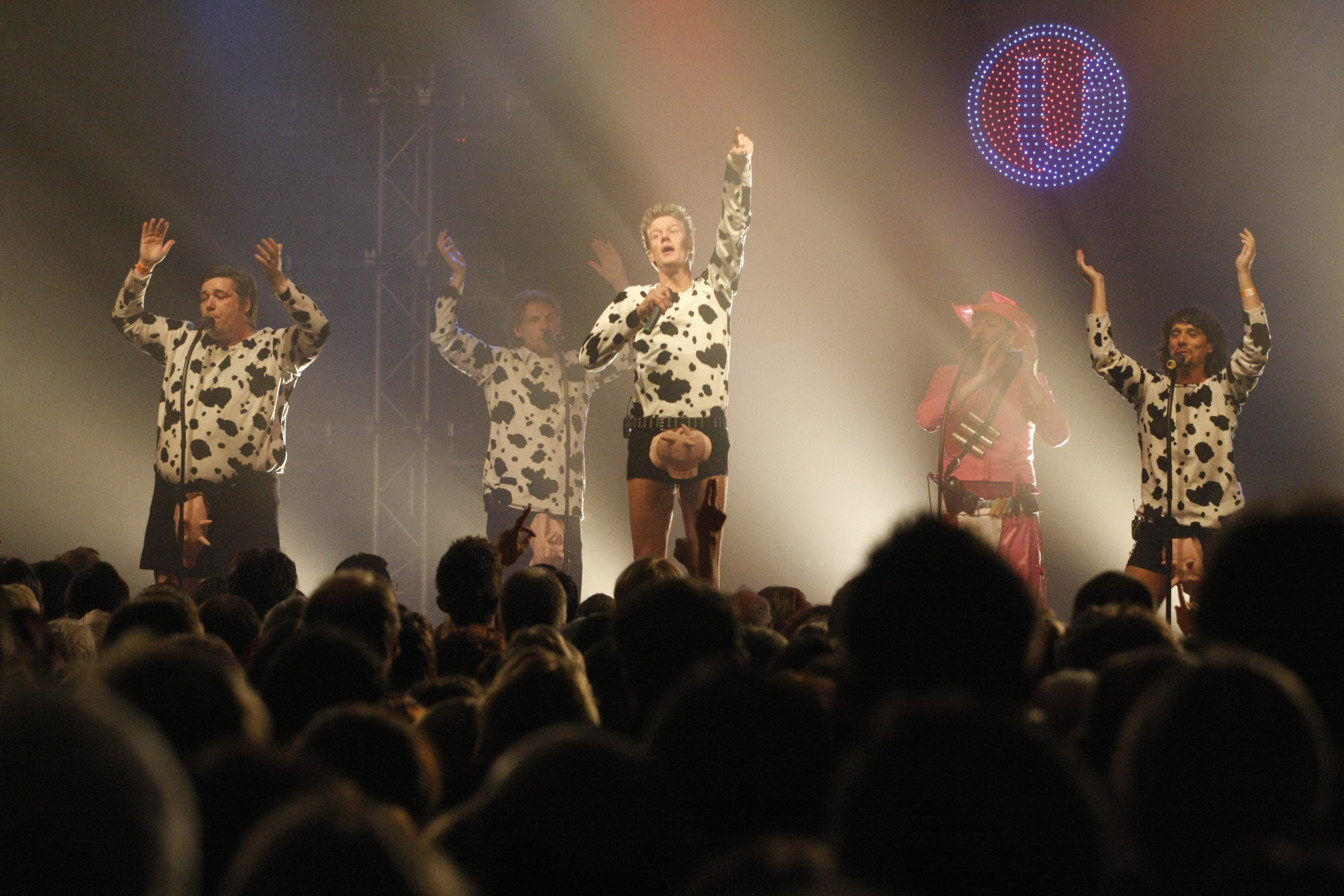
Farewell concert, Woogwiese in Frankfurt am Main, 1 May 2009

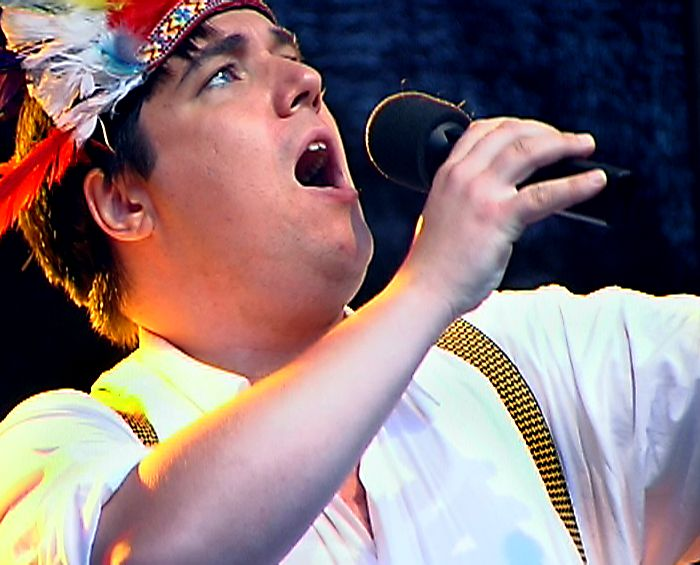
Festival "Juicy Fruit" 2000 in Dortmund

The U-Bahn Kontrollöre in tiefgefrorenen Frauenkleidern were an a cappella band from Hesse, Germany. The quintet was founded in 1991 and termed itself "hardcore a cappella", with members Harald Bannoehr, Matthias Keller, Sebastian Rajkovic, Filippo Tiberia, and Oliver Hart. The group combined music and comedy. In March 2008, the band announced their farewell for May 2009, the title of their farewell tour was "Wir sind dann mal weg“ (We're off).

== Discography ==
- 1996 - RabimmelRabammelRabumm
- 1998 - Simsalabimbambasaladusaladim
- 2002 - Gesichtsgünther
- 2004 - Glücklich
- 2005 - Hardcore acapella
- 2007 - Vollgas
