= Harald Weiss =

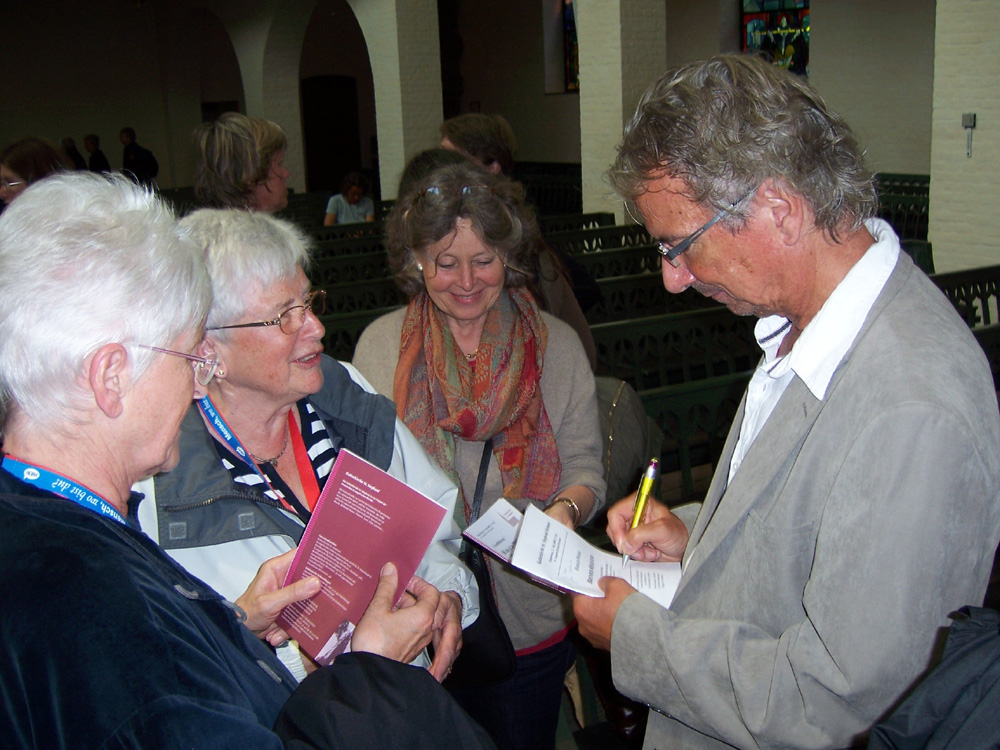
Weiss in 2009

Harald Weiss (surname also spelled Weiß; born 26 May 1949) is a German composer, director, screenwriter and free-lance artist.

== Biography ==
Weiss was born in Salzgitter. His compositions are influenced by minimalism as well as jazz and rock music. Numerous trips (in the context of theatre workshops and tours) to Africa, Asia, Europe, and South America have also had a significant influence on his music.

Weiss has received many awards for his musical compositions and films, including the Niedersachsen Kulturpreis (1982), the Kulturpreis of Bielefeld (1984), and a fellowship from the Villa Massimo in Rome (1985–1986).

In 2009, Dorothee Mields and Andreas Karasiak were the soloists in his requiem composition Schwarz vor Augen und es ward Licht, dedicated to the Knabenchor Hannover, premiered on 31 October 2009 with the NDR Symphony Orchestra.

Weiss has lived in Mallorca, Spain, since 1984, and his music is published by Schott Music.
