= Lynne Dawson =

English soprano

- Born: 3 June 1953 (age 73); York, England
- Education: Guildhall School of Music; Britten–Pears School
- Occupations: Classical soprano; Academic teacher
- Organizations: Royal Northern College of Music; University of York; Leeds College of Music

Lynne Dawson (born 3 June 1953) is an English soprano. She came to great prominence through her performance as a soloist in Libera me from Verdi's Requiem with the BBC Singers at Princess Diana's funeral in September 1997. Lynne Dawson has recorded over seventy-five CDs and has a varied concert and operatic repertoire.

== Biography ==
Born in York and growing up in Yorkshire, Dawson fully expected to continue the farming tradition of her family, and indeed singing was not her first career; she first worked in industry as a translator. However, later she studied at both the Guildhall School of Music and Britten–Pears School in Suffolk, where her teachers included Rae Woodland, Gerald Moore and Peter Pears. Her time as a music student, however, was limited as she soon obtained enough professional work to embark upon a career and made her operatic debut in 1986 as the Countess in Le Nozze di Figaro (Kent Opera). Dawson's position as one of England's most versatile and popular sopranos was confirmed by her performance as a soloist in "Libera me" from Verdi's Requiem with the BBC Singers at the Funeral of Diana, Princess of Wales in September 1997. She still continues a busy musical schedule, is head of vocal and opera studies at the Royal Northern College of Music (RNCM) as well as the University of York and is a Professor of Leeds College of Music.

== Personal life ==
Dawson has two children, and was married during the 1980s, but the couple separated. She continues to sing often; however, her main focus is her role as Head of Vocal Studies and Opera at RNCM.

== Vocal career ==
Dawson has had an extensive and varied music career. Much of her early work was in early music groups, in particular the Hilliard Ensemble[check: Tallis Scholars?] and the Deller Consort and her work in early music, in particular the works of George Frideric Handel, are regarded as being notable contributions to the field. However, in spite of her reputation as a Handel specialist, her repertoire is far more varied – she created the role of 'Mama' in Elliott Carter's opera What Next? and played Ann Truelove in The Rake's Progress, for instance. Her concert repertoire, oratorio roles and recording catalogue are no less impressive having appeared alongside acclaimed singers and conductors alike. She has released three highly acclaimed solo recital discs – My Personal Handel Collection, On This Island and Voyage à Paris.

== Selected recordings ==
=== CDs ===
- L'Orfeo, Monteverdi (with English Baroque Soloists/His Majestys Sagbutts and Cornetts/John Eliot Gardiner), Archiv (1987)
- Jephtha, Handel (with English Baroque Soloists/Monteverdi Choir/John Eliot Gardiner), Philips Classics (1988), live recording
- Passio, Pärt (with Western Wind Chamber Choir/Paul Hillier), ECM (1988)
- The Fairy Queen, Purcell (with Les Arts Florissants/William Christie), Harmonia Mundi (1989)
- ‘’Die Entführung aus dem Serail’’ Mozart with The Academy of Ancient Music/Christopher Hogwood
- A Midsummer Night's Dream, Mendelssohn (with Susanne Mentzer/Peter Hall Company/Rotterdam Philharmonic Orchestra/Jeffrey Tate), EMI (1992)
- Ein deutsches Requiem, Brahms (with London Classical Players/Roger Norrington), EMI (1993)
- Messiah, Handel (with Choir of King's College, Cambridge/Brandenburg Consort/Stephen Cleobury), Argo (1994), live recording on Brilliant Classics and Regis Records
- Chandos Anthems, Handel (with The Sixteen/Harry Christophers), Chandos (1987–89)
- Orfeo ed Euridice, Gluck (with La Grande Écurie et la Chambre du Roy/Jean-Claude Malgoire), Auvidis (1994)
- Riders to the Sea, Vaughan Williams (with Northern Sinfonia/Richard Hickox), Chandos (1995)
- Ariodante, Handel (with Les Musiciens du Louvre/Marc Minkowski), Archiv (1997)
- Zaïde, Mozart (with Academy of Ancient Music/Paul Goodwin), Harmonia Mundi (1998)
- On This Island (with Malcolm Martineau), Hyperion (2001)
- Dido and Aeneas, Purcell (with Orchestra of the Age of Enlightenment/René Jacobs), Harmonia Mundi (2001)
- Hercules, Handel (with Les Musiciens du Louvre/Marc Minkowski), Archiv (2002)
- My Personal Handel Collection (with Lautten Compagney/Wolfgang Katschner), Berlin Classics (2003)
- Voyage à Paris: Chansons françaises (with Julius Drake), Berlin Classics (2005)

=== DVDs ===
- Messiah (1993)
- The Queen (2006)
