= Göttingen Boys' Choir =

Boys' choir in Germany

- Choir
- Origin: Göttingen, Lower Saxony, Germany
- Founded: 1962
- Genre: Boys' choir
- Chief conductor: Michael Krause
- Website: www.goettinger-knabenchor.de

Göttingen Boys' Choir, founded in 1962, is a mixed boys choir (SATB). The choir consists, including pre-choruses, of about 120 singers aged 6 to 21. As a non-confessional municipal choir, it has been directed since 2003 by music teacher Michael Krause.

== History ==
The Göttingen Boys' Choir emerged in 1962 as a school choir for a boys grammar school. Under the direction of its founder Franz Herzog, who received his musical training at the Dresdner Kreuzchor (Dresden Holy Cross Choir), the choir soon became famous outside Göttingen. As early as 1964, the choir was recorded for German public radio and television. Moreover, the Choir started to cooperate with the Göttingen International Handel Festival. After Franz Herzog's retirement for health reasons in 1980, Torsten Derlin (1985-1985), Martin Heubach (1985-1989), and Stefan Kaden (1989-2003) ran the choir. Since 2003 Michael Krause, a music teacher at the Otto-Hahn Gymnasium in Göttingen, has been running the choir. In addition to cultivating the classical choral repertoire, Michael Krause has expanded the choir's repertoire by adding works by contemporary composers.

== Structure ==
=== Main Choir ===
In the main choir, about 60 boys and young men sing. They are aged 9 to 21 years and are from different middle and high schools in Göttingen and its surroundings. The boys sing the soprano and alto voices, while the men sing the tenor and bass parts. The choir rehearses two or three times a week on the lectern or with all voices. Also, the choir rehearses one full day a month and once a year for a week during the holidays. Concerts, as well as recordings and individual and group voice work, complete the choral life.

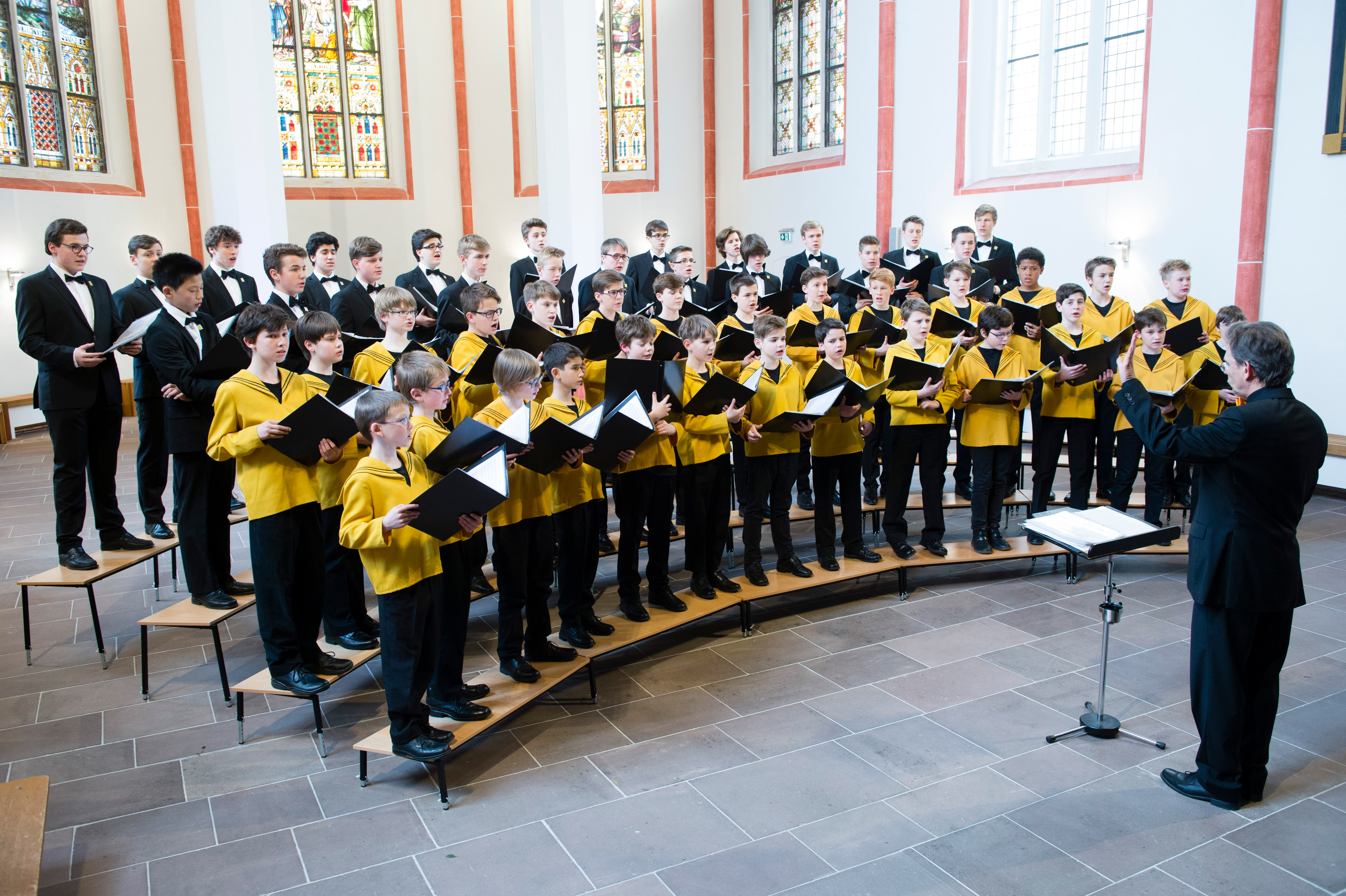
The Göttingen Boys' Choir 2016 in St. John, Göttingen

=== Pre-Choruses ===
For pre-school children, an offer has been set up to introduce boys to singing at an early age. The music education groups at the various primary schools in Göttingen are the mainstay for the promotion of young talents. Singers who have already taken part in these programs can continue to sing in the two pre-chorals, which are also open to newcomers. This is where individual singing lessons and first introductions to music theory take place. Every year more than 100 boys from Göttingen and the surrounding area participate in the various programs for young singers. Regular performances in partner schools and end of the school year performances with the pre-choruses prepare the singers for the entrance examination of the main choir.

=== Sponsorship ===
The choir is under the independent sponsorship of a non-profit association (Göttinger Knabenchor e. V.). The choir is also supported by the city of Göttingen and other institutions. Since 2020, Göttingen Boys' Choir has been part of an initiative of the Lower Saxony Ministry of Science and Culture to promote excellent youth choirs.

== Repertoire ==
The Göttingen Boys' Choir sings sacred and secular works from all periods of music history. They place particular emphasis on a cappella choral music. However, sometimes great choral symphonic works are also performed, occasionally in cooperation with other choirs. The Göttingen Boys' Choir significantly cultivates the musical legacy of its founder Franz Herzog, who composed, among other, sacred works, arrangements of folk songs, and secular choral music.

== Concert tours and choral exchange ==
Since its foundation, the choir has toured internationally in nations like the United Kingdom, France, Sweden, Poland, Switzerland, the Netherlands, the United States, South Africa, and, recently, Japan. Often the host choirs come back for return visits. For example, despite the Cold War in the 1970s, a choral friendship developed with the Poznan Nightingales, a famous boys choir in Poland. Other contacts are maintained with, among others, the Cantores Minores in Helsinki, the Hiroshima Boys' Choir, and the Dresdner Kreuzchor (Dresden Holy Cross Choir). The choir maintains a particularly close relationship with the Uetersen Boys' Choir and the Wiesbadener Knabenchor. Finally, the Göttingen Boys' Choir regularly participates in international choral festivals.

== Literature ==
- Herbert Schur, Gisela Krahmer (ed.): Franz Herzog und der Göttinger Knabenchor 1960 - 1980, Göttingen 1990 (in German).
- Göttinger Knabenchor (ed.): 50 Jahre Göttinger Knabenchor 1962–2012, Göttingen 2012 (in German).
- Vitus Froesch: Franz Herzog – ein Kruzianer in Göttingen. Chordirigent und Komponist. Tectum Wissenschaftsverlag, Baden-Baden 2017 (Dresdner Schriften zur Musik 10), p. 111–157 (in German).
- Herbert Schur: Laudatio anlässlich der Enthüllung der Gedenktafel für Franz Herzog, in: Göttinger Jahrbuch 2018, Bd. 66, 2018, ISSN 0072-4882, p. 283 ff (in German).
