= Dresdner Kammerchor =

Chamber choir in Dresden, Germany

- Choir
- Origin: Dresden, Germany
- Founded: 1985
- Genre: Mixed chamber choir
- Members: 40
- Chief conductor: Hans-Christoph Rademann
- Website: www.dresdner-kammerchor.de

The Dresdner Kammerchor (Dresden Chamber Choir) is a mixed chamber choir which was founded in 1985 by Hans-Christoph Rademann in Dresden and is still conducted by him. The semiprofessional ensemble of about 40 singers has appeared internationally.

== History and performances ==
Hans-Christoph Rademann founded the choir in 1985 while he was still a student at the Musikhochschule Dresden. Most of the singers were fellow students. The choir is still connected to the conservatory, now called Hochschule für Musik "Carl Maria von Weber", and many members are students or alumni.

It is part of the profile of the Dresdner Kammerchor to perform and record music written for the court of Dresden under Augustus the Strong and his successor Frederick Augustus II, including works by Johann David Heinichen, Johann Adolf Hasse and Jan Dismas Zelenka. The choir has also performed contemporary music and won awards in international competitions for that repertory.

The choir has appeared at festivals such as the Bachwoche Ansbach, Handel Festival Halle, Rheingau Musik Festival and the Handel Festival Göttingen. They have collaborated with conductors such as Paul McCreesh, Rafael Frühbeck de Burgos, Riccardo Chailly, Ádám Fischer, René Jacobs, Helmut Müller-Brühl, Roger Norrington, Herbert Blomstedt, and with ensembles such as Akademie für Alte Musik Berlin and the Orchestra of the Age of Enlightenment. In 2010, they recorded Bach's complete Christmas Oratorio with the Gewandhausorchester, conducted by Riccardo Chailly, with Martin Lattke as the Evangelist.

The chamber choir celebrated its 25th anniversary on 29 May 2011 with a concert of Mendelssohn's oratorio Paulus in the Kreuzkirche, performed as part of the Dresdner Musikfestspiele and broadcast by the Mitteldeutscher Rundfunk, with an orchestra formed by members of the Staatskapelle Dresden and the Dresden Philharmonic, soloists Anna Prohaska, Lothar Odinius and René Pape, conducted by founder Hans-Christoph Rademann. On 9 November 2011, in a concert in the synagogue of Görlitz in memory of the victims of the 1938 Kristallnacht, the choir performed music composed after 1945 by composers Robert Heppener, Charlotte Seither and Henryk Gorecki on words by Paul Celan.

== Selected recordings ==
=== a cappella ===
- 1996 Geistliche Chormusik aus vier Jahrhunderten I, works by Johann Hermann Schein, Bach, Felix Mendelssohn, Johannes Brahms, Rudolf Mauersberger
- 1998 Geistliche Chormusik aus vier Jahrhunderten II, works by Schein, Robert Ramsey, Anton Bruckner, Max Reger, Arnold Schoenberg, Frank Martin
- 2001 Schein: Israelsbrünnlein
- 2002 Weihnachten (Christmas), works by Heinrich Schütz, Christoph Demantius, Johann Eccard, Josef Rheinberger, Brahms, Reger, Francis Poulenc, Jan Sandström, Karsten Gundermann, among others
- 2005 Reger: Es waren zwei Königskinder
- 2011 Schütz: Italienische Madrigale (Italian madrigals)

=== with orchestra ===
- 1996 Claudio Monteverdi: Vespro della Beata Virgine
- 1997 Geistliche Musik am polnisch-sächsischen Hof, works by Hasse and Zelenka
- 2000 Heinichen: Missa No. 9, Zelenka: Te Deum
- 2001 Heinichen: Missa No. 12, Bach: Magnificat
- 2001 Schütz: Der Schwanengesang
- 2002 Heinichen: Missa No. 11, Georg Friedrich Händel: Dixit Dominus
- 2003 Olof Lindgren: Concerto Canto, Nosag, with Duo Gelland
- 2004 Bach: St Matthew Passion, Kölner

Kammerorchester, Helmut Müller-Brühl

- 2004 Rammsteins "Mein Teil" on the album Reise, Reise
- 2005 Bach: Mass in B minor, Kölner Kammerorchester, Helmut Müller-Brühl
- 2005 Hasse: Requiem E-flat major / Miserere D minor
- 2006 Bach: Christmas Oratorio, parts I-III
- 2007 Dietrich Buxtehude: Membra Jesu Nostri
- 2007 Schütz: Geistliche Chormusik 1648
- 2007 George Frideric Handel: Der Messias, in German by Johann Gottfried Herder, Lautten Compagney, Wolfgang Katschner
- 2009 Handel: Saul
- 2010 Hasse: Requiem C major / Miserere C minor
- 2011 Schütz: Musikalische Exequien und andere Trauergesänge
