= Sergio Vartolo =

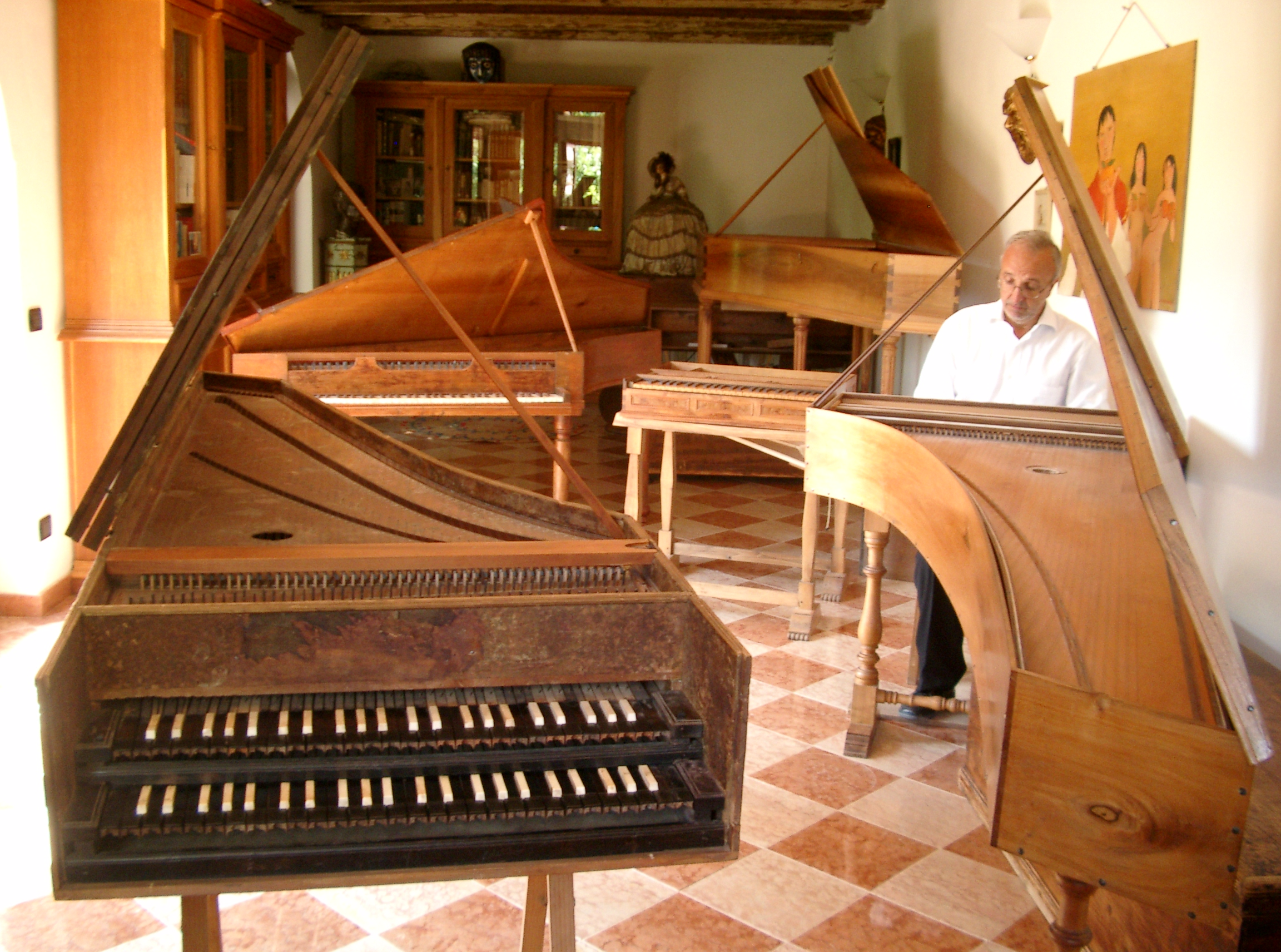
Sergio Vartolo in his studio with: Spinettone (17th c.), French harpsichord (clavecin, 17th c.), Regal organ; Italian harpsichord (clavicembalo, copy).; (June 2003)

Sergio Vartolo (born in Bologna in 1944) is an Italian harpsichordist, organist, musicologist and conductor; in the past he was also active as a countertenor. In 1996 he was appointed maestro de capella of the Cappella Musicale di San Petronio di Bologna founded in 1436. He has an extensive discography, both as a harpsichordist - the complete works of Girolamo Frescobaldi, and as a conductor - particularly works by Giovanni Paolo Colonna and Giacomo Antonio Perti associated with San Petronio, but also operas by Claudio Monteverdi and others.
