= Hans-Christoph Rademann =

German choral conductor (born 1965)

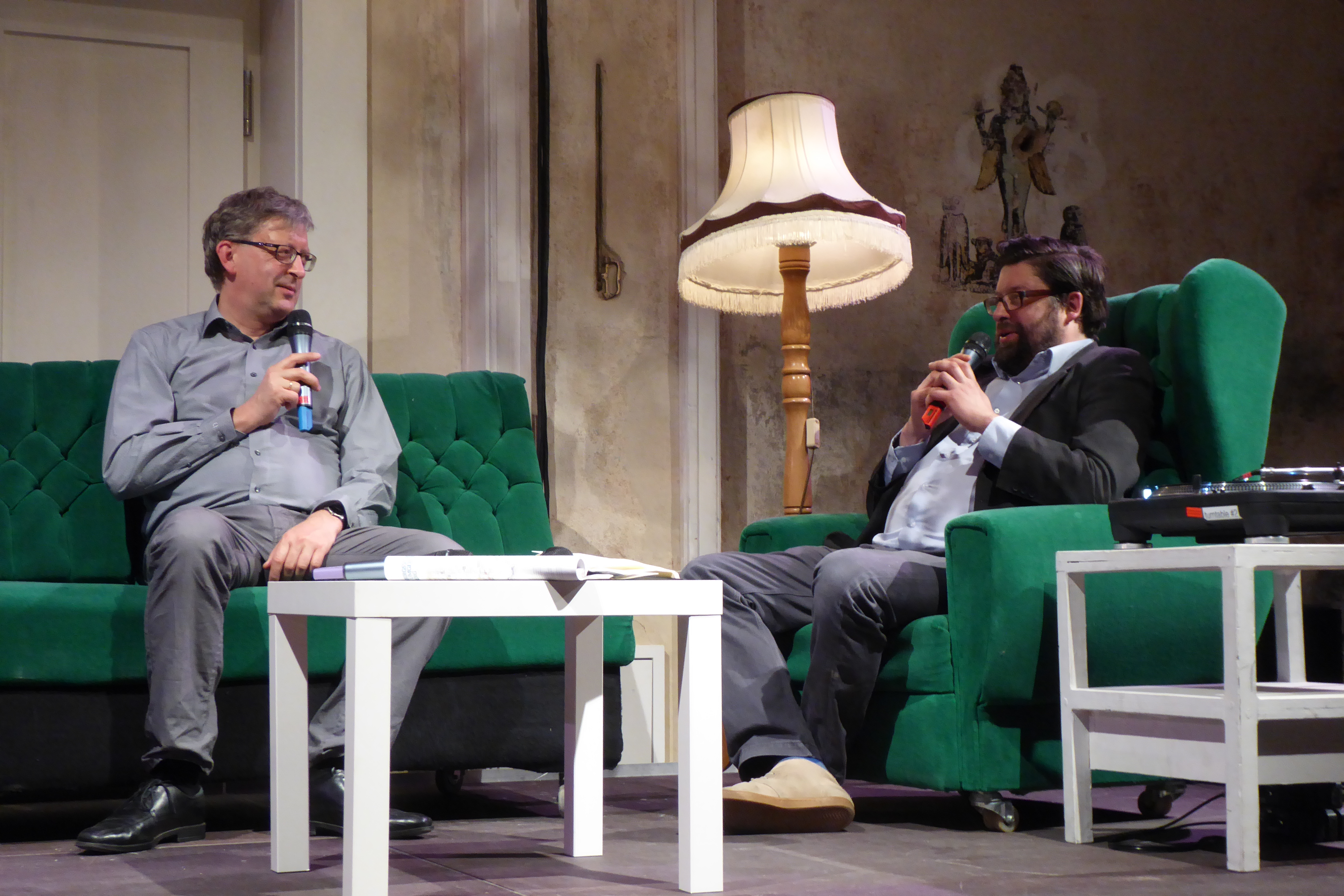
- Hans-Christoph Rademann with his brother Max Rademann
- Born: 5 August 1965 (age 60); Dresden, Saxony, Germany
- Education: Dresdner Kreuzchor; Musikhochschule Dresden
- Occupation: Choral conductor
- Organizations: Dresdner Kammerchor; NDR Chor; RIAS Kammerchor; Internationale Bachakademie Stuttgart
- Awards: Sächsische Verfassungsmedaille

Hans-Christoph Rademann (born 5 August 1965 in Dresden) is a German choral conductor, currently the director of the Dresdner Kammerchor and the Internationale Bachakademie Stuttgart.

== Career ==
Born in Dresden, Rademann grew up in Schwarzenberg and received his first musical experiences in his father's church choir. As a teenager he was taught the violin and piano. From 1975 to 1983, he was a member of the Dresdner Kreuzchor. After completing school, he studied choral and orchestral conducting at the Musikhochschule Dresden until 1990. He acquired further experience in several classes with Helmuth Rilling and Philippe Herreweghe.

Rademann has conducted the chamber choir Dresdner Kammerchor since its founding in 1985. During 1991–1999 he was artistic director of the Academy of Music in Dresden. From 1999 to 2004, Rademann served as choir director of the NDR Chor. With the start of the 2007/2008 season Rademann took over as chief conductor for RIAS Kammerchor; he had already conducted several times as guest conductor. Rademann has served as guest conductor of various leading vocal ensembles, among them Collegium Vocale Gent, the National Chamber Choir of Ireland and the radio choruses of ARD. In 1997 he made his debut as an opera conductor at the Saxony Theatre with Mozart's Die Entführung aus dem Serail. In 1999 he conducted the Netherlands Bach Society's annual performance of Bach's St Matthew Passion. In 2010 he conducted the RIAS Kammerchor and the Akademie für Alte Musik Berlin in performances of Monteverdi's Vespro della Beata Vergine, 400 years after its premiere, including a concert at the Rheingau Musik Festival in Eberbach Abbey, with María Cristina Kiehr, Gerlinde Sämann, James Elliott, Andreas Karasiak and Harry van der Kamp.

In 2000, Rademann was appointed professor of choral conducting at the Musikhochschule in Dresden. On 31 May 2008, he was awarded the Sächsische Verfassungsmedaille of the Landtag of Saxony by the President of the Landtag, Erich Iltgen, "for his commitment to arts and culture in and for Saxony". In 2010 he founded the festival Musikfest Erzgebirge, which is focussed on early music from the region of the Ore Mountains.

In 2013 Rademann succeeded Helmuth Rilling as director of the Internationale Bachakademie Stuttgart.

== Awards ==
- 2008: Sächsische Verfassungsmedaille
- 2025: Georg-Friedrich-Händel-Ring

== Selected recordings ==
In 1995, Rademann conducted Max Bruch's Das Lied von der Glocke after Schiller's ballad with the Dresdner Singakademie and the Dresden Philharmonic at the Kreuzkirche. In 2002, he conducted the Dresdner Kammerchor for a CD Weihnachten (Christmas), a collection of a cappella choral works including Tröstet, tröstet mein Volk by Schütz, Rheinberger's Ave Maria, Reger's O Jesulein süß, Pärt's Magnificat, Poulenc's Hodie Christus natus est, Praetorius/Sandström's Es ist ein Ros entsprungen, summarized in a review as "even the Angel Gabriel himself would have to approve!" His recording with the NDR Chor Reger: O Tod, wie bitter bist du. Reger vocal I was awarded the Preis der Deutschen Schallplattenkritik in April 2005 and the Diapason d'or in January 2006. Their recording Reger: Es sungen drei Engel. Reger vocal II combines works for Christmas, Epiphany and Easter. On a third CD they have recorded works by Bruckner for choir and brass. With the Dresdner Kammerchor he has also recorded music written for the court of Dresden, including sacred choral works by Johann David Heinichen, Johann Adolf Hasse and Jan Dismas Zelenka, and Membra Jesu Nostri by Dieterich Buxtehude, among others.

With the RIAS Kammerchor, he recorded in 2008 lieder and choral works by Mendelssohn. David Vernier remarked in a review: "Mendelssohn's choral composition sensibility ... places more emphasis and importance on the voices – their tone quality, blend and balance, phrasing, and expressive nuances. And in these things, Hans-Christoph Rademann and his RIAS Kammerchor are unsurpassed". In 2010, also with the RIAS Kammerchor, he recorded works by Krenek including Six Motets to Words by Franz Kafka. In 2011, he recorded with the Akademie für Alte Musik Johann Ludwig Bach's Trauermusik, the funeral music for Duke Ernst Ludwig of Saxe-Meiningen.
