= Vo Kuznitse =

"Во кузнице"

Song
- Language: Russian
- English title: "In the Smithy"
- Written: Before 1917
- Genre: Folk
- Songwriter: Unknown

"Vo Kuznitse" (Russian: Во кузнице, [vɐ‿ˈkuzʲnʲɪt͡sə] lit. In the Smithy) is a popular Russian folk song.

The song has been performed by many famous singers, e.g. by Lidia Ruslanova or by Leonid Smetannikov.

== Synopsis ==
The young blacksmiths working in their forge try to attract the attention of a woman (Russian: дуня — simple folk girl or woman; or Ukrainian: доня, romanized: donya — someone's daughter). The text is popularly misunderstood as being only about the exact woman named Dunya. They ask her to go with them into a forest to pluck a burdock leaf, promising to make a new dress for her that she needs to keep clean. The song also clearly has the sense of a parents-to-daughter moral tale which is often lost in translation.

== Commentary ==
=== Historical background ===
According to some authors, the song could be heard during traditional Russian marriage celebrations. Nevertheless, either it was never regarded as a wedding song, or it eventually lost its ceremonial meaning.

The song became extremely popular in the Russian Empire, as well as in different parts of the Soviet Union.

=== Genre characteristics ===
Few sources consider song as a plyasovaya or a shutochnaya. It is mentioned as a khorovodnaya in various works on Russian musical folklore.

=== Settings ===
Many composers (including Yuri Shaporin, Anatoly Alexandrov, Serge Jaroff) arranged the song. In 1951 Nikolay Chaykin wrote his Concerto for Bayan and Orchestra No. 1; the final part of this composition contains a theme based on the melody of Vo Kuznitse.
