= Moritz Kässmayer =

Austrian composer (1831–1884)

Moritz Kässmayer, sometimes spelled Käßmayer (1831, Vienna–1884, Vienna) was an Austrian composer remembered for his humorous settings of folk songs for string quartet. Among the quartets' admirers was Brahms, on his visits to the Kässmayer family house. He had less success with his one comic opera performed in Vienna in 1869, Das Landhaus in Meudon.
