= Mauricio Banchieri =

Chilean businessman and entrepreneur

Mauricio Banchieri Carter
- Born: Santiago de Chile, Chile
- Education: Universidad Nacional Andrés Bello
- Occupations: Businessman, entrepreneur, Chilean Trade Commissioner to New York at ProChile
- Organization: Puro Chile
- Website: www.puro-chile.com

Mauricio Banchieri is a Chilean businessman and entrepreneur. Banchieri is the Chilean Trade Commissioner to New York at ProChile. He is a board member for the Chilean American Chamber of Commerce (CACC) in New York. He is the founder of Puro Chile, a Chilean specialty food store chain.

== Early life and education ==
Banchieri was born in Santiago, Chile. He holds a bachelor's degree in Business Administration from Andrés Bello National University in Santiago and a Master of Science in Information Systems from American University in Washington D.C.

== Career ==
In 2004, Banchieri and his business partner founded the mobile marketing firm MZZO in Chile. MZZO was established as an information technology company, specializing in mobile marketing, web and engineering design.

According to Newsweek, in 2009 Banchieri founded Puro Chile, a store to promote "the best products and services Chile has to offer to the city of New York." Puro Chile and Puro Vino are niche shopping stores that promote Chilean culture in New York through luxury goods, food, textiles, and wine. The Wall Street Journal classified Puro Chile as one of the best country-specific stores in NYC.

In 2012, Banchieri was selected by the Business and Economics faculty at the Universidad Andrés Bello as the most successful alumni for his graduating year.

Banchieri is a board member of the Chilean-American Chamber of Commerce of New York. In January 2015, he spoke on a panel discussing the economical and business climate in Latin America at a conference hosted by the CACC.

=== Chilean Trade Commissioner to New York ===
Banchieri was named the Chilean Trade Commissioner to New York in 2014. As the trade commissioner, he helps develop Chilean trade in goods and services, promotes and attracts foreign direct investment, and fosters tourism.
