= Martin Lattke =

German opera singer

- Born: 29 May 1981 (age 44); Pirna, Germany
- Education: Thomanerchor; University of Music and Theatre Leipzig
- Occupation: Tenor
- Organizations: ensemble amarcord

Martin Lattke (born 29 May 1981) is a German tenor, performing as a soloist and former member of the ensemble amarcord.

== Career ==
Born in Pirna, Martin Lattke was seven years old when he received his first singing training. He was a member of the Thomanerchor as a boy soprano for nine years beginning in 1990.

In 1999 he co-founded the Leipzig vocal quintet Calmus, with which he did concert tours in Europe and the US. He won awards at international competitions. In 2002, he was awarded a scholarship of the German Music Competition. Since 2006 he is a member of the ensemble amarcord. Lattke received singing lessons from Gotthold Schwarz in Leipzig, completed studies in industrial engineering in 2003, and studied then singing at the University of Music and Theatre Leipzig with Hans-Joachim Beyer. In 2007 he attended a master class with Peter Schreier and received artistic impulses for singing the part of the Evangelist in Bach's Passions.

Lattke's repertoire includes songs and ensemble literature from the Renaissance to contemporary, oratorios, preferably of the works of Bach, and opera. His debut as the Evangelist in Bach's Christmas Oratorio in 2008 was at the Teatro La Fenice, conducted by Riccardo Chailly. He performed at the Maggio Musicale Fiorentino, with the Lebanese National Orchestra in Beirut, and performed regularly Bach's Passions with the Thomanerchor, directed by Thomaskantor Georg Christoph Biller in the Thomaskirche. During his singing career he toured Europe, the U.S., Australia, Canada, Russia, Korea, Africa, Central America and the Middle East.

== Recordings ==
Lattke performed in 2009 with the ensemble amarcord in a concert and live recording of Bach's lost St Mark Passion. The reconstruction by Diethard Hellmann, revised by Andreas Glöckner, was performed in the Frauenkirche Dresden, with the Kölner Akademie conducted by Michael Alexander Willens.

Lattke appeared as the Evangelist in a 2010 recording of Bach's Christmas Oratorio for Decca with the Gewandhausorchester, conducted by Chailly, and in a 2012 recording of Bach's St Matthew Passion conducted by Biller on DVD. A reviewer noted: "Martin Lattke as the Evangelist delivers his recitatives with plenty of engaging interest and without histrionics."

Lattke was in 2010 with the ensemble amarcord a winner of the ECHO Klassik for the album "Restless Love", and in 2012 again for the album "Das Lieben bringt groß Freud".
