= Adolf Eduard Marschner =

German composer

Adolf Eduard Marschner (Grünberg, Schlesien, 5 March 1819 – Leipzig, 9 September 1853) was a Romantic German composer.

Marschner was related to the well known Heinrich Marschner. He studied music from the age of 10 and then studied at the University of Leipzig where he also later became a music teacher.

In the field of vocal music he has composed app. 30 pieces for voice and piano accompaniment and several songs for men’s choir. The most popular among those are Und hörst du das mächtige Klingen, Das Königslied and Gute Nacht.

Together with Ludwig Richter in 1844–1847 he published two song collections named Alte und neue Studenten-Lieder (Old and new Student Songs), and Alte und neue Volks-Lieder (Old and new Folk Songs).
