= Wolfram Lattke =

German singer

Wolfram Lattke (born 1978, Pirna) is a German singer. He is a lyric tenor and began singing aged seven. He was a member of the Dresdner Kreuzchor (1987–1988) and the Thomanerchor (1988–1996), both times as a male soprano.
