= Raumklang =

German record label

- Founded: 1993
- Founder: Sebastian Pank
- Genre: Classical music
- Country of origin: Germany
- Location: Leipzig
- Official website: www.raumklang.de

Raumklang is a German classical music record label founded in 1993 by viola player and saxophonist Sebastian Pank and based in Leipzig. He is the son of Siegfried Pank.

== Selected recordings ==
The label ranges from medieval to contemporary music. Several recordings have been noted by the press, musicologists, or won awards.

- Music of Georgia: Antchis Chati Chor: Georgische Reise (2004)
