= Mass in B minor discography =

Recordings of J.S. Bach's BWV 232

The listing shows recordings of the Mass in B minor, BWV 232, by Johann Sebastian Bach. The selection is taken from the 281 recordings listed on the Bach Cantatas Website as of 2018, beginning with the first recording by a symphony orchestra and choir to match, conducted by Albert Coates. Beginning in the late 1960s, historically informed performances paved the way for recordings with smaller groups, boys choirs and ensembles playing period instruments, and eventually to recordings using the one-voice-on-a-vocal-part scoring first argued for by Joshua Rifkin in 1982.

== History ==
The work was first recorded by symphonic choirs and orchestras. From the late 1960s, historically informed performances (HIP) tried to adhere more to the sounds of the composer's lifetime, who typically wrote for boys choirs and for comparatively small orchestras of Baroque instruments, often now called "period instruments". Some scholars believe that Bach used only one singer for a vocal part in the choral movements, termed "one voice per part" (OVPP). On some of these recordings, the solo singer is reinforced in choral movements with a larger orchestra by a ripieno singer (OVPP+R).

The first complete recording of the work was conducted by Albert Coates in 1929. Robert Shaw led the first American recording in 1947. Some recordings are documents of live concerts, such as a 1968 performance conducted by Karl Richter at the Moscow Conservatory Grand Hall. The same year, the first HIP recording appeared, conducted by Nikolaus Harnoncourt, followed by Johan van der Meer's version with the Groningse Bachvereniging in 1975 which was recorded live in Utrecht at the Holland Festival. The first OVPP recording appeared in 1982, conducted by Joshua Rifkin.

== Table of selected recordings ==
The sortable listing is taken from the selection provided by Aryeh Oron on the Bach-Cantatas website.

Soloists Bach composed the work for five soloists: soprano I and II, alto, tenor and bass. The soloists are listed in the table in the order SATB.

Some recordings arranged the music for four soloists, the movements in which soprano II (SII) is requested, are divided, sung by soprano I (SI) and alto (A).

- Christe eleison: A for SII in the duet with SI
- Laudamus te: SI or A in the aria for SII

Some recordings divide the two bass solos on two singers because of their very different tessitura:

- Quoniam tu solus sanctus: the aria requires a bass with a strong low register
- Et in spiritum sanctum: the aria requires a bass with a high range which would today be termed a baritone

The composition has a movement for two choirs SATB, Osanna. In recordings with one voice per part (OVPP), the soloists are normally listed in the order SSAATTBB. For some recordings, only the singers doing solo work are named.

Choir type

1. Large choirs (red background): Large (unspecified), Bach (choir dedicated to Bach's music, founded in the mid-20th century, Boys (choir of all male voices), Radio (choir of a broadcaster), Symphony (choir related to a symphony orchestra)
2. Medium-size choirs, such as Chamber, Chorale (choir dedicated mostly to church music), Motet
3. One voice per part (green background): OVPP or OVPP+R (with ripienists reinforcing the soloists in some chorale movements)

Orchestra type

1. Large orchestras (red background): Bach (orchestra dedicated to Bach's music, founded in the mid-20th century), Radio (symphony orchestra of a broadcaster), Symphony
2. Chamber orchestra
3. Orchestra on period instruments (green background)

=== Table ===
Recordings of Bach's Mass in B minor, BWV 232
Conductor / Choir / Orchestra	Soloists	Label	Year	Choir type	Orch. type
Albert Coates The Philharmonic Choir London Symphony Orchestra	Elisabeth Schumann; Margaret Balfour; Walter Widdop; Friedrich Schorr	HMV	1929	Large	Symphony
Robert Shaw RCA Victor Chorale RCA Victor Orchestra	Anne McKnight; June Gardner; Lydia Summers; Lucius Metz; Paul Matthen	RCA Victor	1947	Chorale	Radio
Hermann Scherchen Wiener Akademie-Kammerchor Wiener Symphoniker	Emmy Loose; Hilde Ceska; Gertrud Burgsthaler-Schuster; Anton Dermota; Alfred Poell	Westminster	1950	Chamber	Symphony
George Enescu BBC Chorus Boyd Neel Orchestra	Suzanne Danco; Kathleen Ferrier; Peter Pears; Bruce Boyce; Norman Walker	BBC	1951	Radio	Symphony
Herbert von Karajan Singverein der Gesellschaft der Musikfreunde in Wien Orchester der Gesellschaft der Musikfreunde in Wien, Philharmonia Orchestra	Elisabeth Schwarzkopf; Marga Höffgen; Nicolai Gedda; Heinz Rehfuss	EMI	1952 (Note: recorded in Nov. 1952, first in Vienna’s Musikverein and then at Abbey Road, with a patch-up session at Abbey Road on 16 July 1953)	Large	Symphony
Fritz Lehmann RIAS Kammerchor Berlin Radio Symphony Orchestra	Gunthild Weber; Margherita de Landi; Helmut Krebs; Karl Wolfram	Urania	1953	Radio	Radio
Fritz Werner Heinrich-Schütz-Chor Heilbronn Pforzheim Chamber Orchestra	Ingeborg Reichelt; Elisabeth Fellner; Helmut Krebs; Franz Kelch	Erato	1957		Chamber
Hermann Scherchen Wiener Akademie-Kammerchor Vienna State Opera Orchestra	Pierrette Alarie; Nan Merriman; Léopold Simoneau; Gustav Neidlinger	Westminster	1959	Chamber	Opera
Robert Shaw Robert Shaw Chorale Robert Shaw Orchestra	Adele Addison; Saramae Endich; Florence Kopleff; Mallory Walker; Asa Barberian	RCA Victor Red Seal	1960	Chorale	Symphony
Karl Richter Münchener Bach-Chor Münchener Bach-Orchester	Maria Stader; Hertha Töpper; Ernst Haefliger; Kieth Engen; Dietrich Fischer-Dieskau	Archiv Produktion	1961	Bach	Bach
Otto Klemperer BBC Chorus New Philharmonia Orchestra	Agnes Giebel; Janet Baker; Nicolai Gedda; Hermann Prey; Franz Crass	EMI	1967	Radio	Symphony
Nikolaus Harnoncourt Chorus Viennensis Concentus Musicus Wien	Rotraud Hansmann; Emiko Iiyama; Helen Watts; Kurt Equiluz; Max van Egmond	Teldec	1968		Period
Karl Richter Münchener Bach-Chor Münchener Bach-Orchester	Ursula Buckel; Hertha Töpper; Ernst Haefliger; Peter van der Bilt	Melodiya / Ars Nova	1968	Bach	Bach
Johan van der Meer Groningse Bachvereniging La Petite Bande	Soloist of the Tölzer Knabenchor; Kevin Smith; Marius van Altena; Max van Egmond	Teldec	1968	Bach	Period
Herbert von Karajan Wiener Singverein Berliner Philharmoniker	Gundula Janowitz; Christa Ludwig; Peter Schreier; Robert Kerns; Karl Ridderbusch	Deutsche Grammophon	1974	Large	Symphony
Helmuth Rilling Gächinger Kantorei Bach-Collegium Stuttgart	Arleen Augér; Julia Hamari; Adalbert Kraus; Wolfgang Schöne; Siegmund Nimsgern	Hänssler	1977	Chorale	Chamber
Eugen Jochum Bavarian Radio Choir Bavarian Radio Symphony Orchestra	Helen Donath; Brigitte Fassbaender; Claes-Håkan Ahnsjö; Roland Hermann; Robert Holl	EMI	1980	Radio	Radio
Joshua Rifkin The Bach Ensemble	Judith Nelson; Julianne Baird; Jeffrey Dooley; Drew Minter; Frank Hoffmeister; Edmund Brownless; Jon Opalach; Andrew Walker Schultze	Nonesuch	1982	OVPP	Period
Andrew Parrott Taverner Consort and Players	Emma Kirkby; Emily Van Evera; Panito Iconomou (boy alto); Christian Immler (boy alto); Michael Kilian (boy alto); Rogers Covey-Crump; David Thomas	EMI	1984	OVPP	Period
Gustav Leonhardt Collegium Musicum of De Nederlandse Bachvereniging La Petite Bande	Isabelle Poulenard; Guillemette Laurens; René Jacobs; John Elwes; Max van Egmond; Harry van der Kamp	Deutsche Harmonia Mundi	1985		Period
John Eliot Gardiner The Monteverdi Choir The English Baroque Soloists	Nancy Argenta; Michael Chance; Elizabeth Wilcock; Stephen Varcoe; Carol Hall; Mary Nichols	Archiv	1985		Period
Helmut Kahlhöfer Kantorei Barmen-Gemarke	Mitsuko Shirai; Hildegard Laurich; Karl Markus; Andreas Schmidt	Kantorei Barmen-Gemarke	1985		
Robert Shaw Atlanta Chamber Chorus Atlanta Symphony Orchestra	Sylvia McNair; Delores Ziegler; Marietta Simpson; John Aler; William Stone; Thomas Paul	Telarc	1990	Chamber	Symphony
Georg Solti Chicago Symphony Chorus Chicago Symphony Orchestra	Felicity Lott; Anne Sofie von Otter; Hans Peter Blochwitz; William Shimell; Gwynne Howell	London	1990	Symphony	Symphony
René Jacobs RIAS Kammerchor Akademie für Alte Musik Berlin	Hillevi Martinpelto; Bernarda Fink; Axel Köhler; Christoph Prégardien; Matthias Goerne; Franz-Josef Selig	Berlin Classics	1992	Chamber	Period
Richard Hickox Collegium Musicum 90 Collegium Musicum 90	Nancy Argenta; Catherine Denley; Mark Tucker; Stephen Varcoe	Chandos	1992		Period
Karl-Friedrich Beringer Windsbacher Knabenchor Deutsche Kammerakademie Neuss	Christine Schäfer; Ingeborg Danz; Markus Schäfer; Thomas Quasthoff	Hänssler	1994	Boys	Chamber
Ton Koopman Amsterdam Baroque Choir Amsterdam Baroque Orchestra	Barbara Schlick; Kai Wessel; Guy de Mey; Klaus Mertens	Erato	1994		Period
Carlo Maria Giulini Bavarian Radio Choir Bavarian Radio Symphony Orchestra	Roberta Alexander; Ruth Ziesak; Jard van Nes; Keith Lewis; David Wilson-Johnson	Sony	1994	Radio	Radio
Philippe Herreweghe Collegium Vocale Gent Collegium Vocale Gent	Johannette Zomer; Véronique Gens; Andreas Scholl; Christoph Prégardien; Peter Kooy; Hanno Müller-Brachmann	Harmonia Mundi	1996		Period
Robert King Tölzer Knabenchor The King's Consort	Boy sopranos: Matthias Ritter, Manuel Mrasek; Boy altos: Matthias Schloderer, Maximilian Fraas; Anthony Rolfe-Johnson; Michael George	Hyperion	1996	Boys	Period
Thomas Hengelbrock Balthasar-Neumann-Chor Freiburger Barockorchester	Gundula Anders; Mona Spägele; Ursula Fiedler; Jürgen Banholzer; Bernhard Landauer; Hermann Oswald; Knut Schoch; Johannes-Christoph Happel; Stephan MacLeod	Harmonia Mundi	1996		Period
Greg Funfgeld The Bach Choir of Bethlehem The Bach Festival Orchestra	Tamara Matthews; Rosa Lamoreaux; Marietta Simpson; Frederick Urrey; William Sharp; Daniel Lichti	Dorian Recordings	1997	Bach	Bach
Joshard Daus Bach Ensemble of EuropaChorAkademie Münchner Symphoniker	Hellen Kwon; Hedwig Fassbender; Peter Straka; Wolfgang Newerla; Peter Lika	Arte Nova	1998		
Helmuth Rilling Gächinger Kantorei Bach-Collegium Stuttgart	Sibylla Rubens; Juliane Banse; Ingeborg Danz; James Taylor; Andreas Schmidt; Thomas Quasthoff	Hänssler	1999	Chorale	Chamber
Georg Christoph Biller Thomanerchor Gewandhausorchester	Ruth Holton; Matthias Rexroth; Christoph Genz; Klaus Mertens	Naxos	2000	Boys	Symphony
Sigiswald Kuijken La Petite Bande	Elisabeth Hermans; Midori Suzuki; Patrizia Hardt; Petra Noskaiová; Max Ciolek; Knut Schoch; Jan van der Crabben; Stephan MacLeod	Urtext	2000	OVPP	Period
Konrad Junghänel Cantus Cölln	Johanna Koslowsky; Mechthild Bach; Monika Mauch; Susanne Rydén; Elisabeth Popien; Henning Voss; Hans Jörg Mammel; Wilfried Jochens; Stephan Schreckenberger; Wolf Matthias Friedrich	Harmonia Mundi	2003	OVPP	Period
Frieder Bernius Kammerchor Stuttgart Barockorchester Stuttgart	Mechthild Bach; Daniel Taylor; Marcus Ullmann; Raimund Nolte	Carus-Verlag	2004	Chamber	Period
Helmuth Rilling Gächinger Kantorei Bach-Collegium Stuttgart	Marlis Petersen; Stella Doufexis; Anke Vondung; Lothar Odinius; Christian Gerhaher; Franz-Josef Selig	Hänssler	2007	Chorale	Chamber
Masaaki Suzuki Bach Collegium Japan Bach Collegium Japan	Carolyn Sampson; Rachel Nicholls; Robin Blaze; Gerd Türk; Peter Kooy	BIS	2007		Period
Sigiswald Kuijken La Petite Bande	Gerlinde Sämann; Elisabeth Hermans; Patrizia Hardt; Petra Noskaiová; Bernhard Hunziker; Christoph Genz; Marcus Niedermeyr; Jan van der Crabben	Challenge Classics	2008	OVPP	Period
Frans Brüggen Cappella Amsterdam Orchestra of the Eighteenth Century	Dorothee Mields; Johannette Zomer; Patrick Van Goethem; Jan Kobow; Peter Kooy	Glossa	2009		Period
Jos van Veldhoven De Nederlandse Bachvereniging De Nederlandse Bachvereniging	Dorothee Mields; Johannette Zomer; Matthew White; Charles Daniels; Peter Harvey	Channel Classics Records	2009	OVPP+R	Period
Marc Minkowski Les Musiciens du Louvre Les Musiciens du Louvre	Lucy Crowe; Julia Lezhneva; Joanne Lunn; Blandine Staskiewicz; Nathalie Stutzmann; Terry Wey; Colin Balzer; Markus Brutscher; Christian Immler; Luca Tittoto	Naïve	2009	OVPP+R	Period
John Butt Dunedin Consort Dunedin Players	Susan Hamilton; Cecilia Osmond; Margot Oitzinger; Thomas Hobbs; Matthew Brook; ripienists: Nicola Corbishley; Katie Tretheway; Annemieke Cantor; Christopher Watson; Christopher Adams	Linn	2009	OVPP+R	Period
Georg Christoph Biller Thomanerchor Freiburger Barockorchester	Reglint Bühler; Susanne Krumbiegel; Susanne Langner; Martin Lattke; Markus Flaig	ACCENTUS Music	2013	Boys	Period
