= Christ lag in Todes Banden, BWV 4 discography =

This is a partial list of commercial or professional recordings of Johann Sebastian Bach's cantata Christ lag in Todes Banden, BWV 4, organized chronologically.

The Bach cantatas fell into obscurity after the composer's death and, in the context of their revival, Christ lag in Todes Banden stands out as being having been recorded early and often; as of 2016, the Bach Cantatas Website lists 77 different complete recordings, the earliest dating from 1931.

== First recordings ==
In 1931 Lluís Millet conducted the Orfeó Català in Francesc Pujol's Catalan version of the cantata. The performance was recorded by La Voz de su Amo and appeared on three 78 rpm discs.

BWV 4: 1931 Catalan recording
La Voz de su Amo	His Master's Voice	Movement	Audio
AB 690 (side 1)	11178–A (M 120-1)	1–2a	Flac
AB 690 (side 2)	11178–B (M 120-2)	2b	
AB 691 (side 1)	11179–A (M 120-3)	3	Flac
AB 691 (side 2)	11179–B (M 120-4)	4–5	Flac
AB 692 (side 1)	11180–A (M 120-5)	6	
AB 692 (side 2)	11180–B (M 120-6)	7	

In 1937 Nadia Boulanger made her first recording of the cantata in Paris for Voix de son maître (His Master's Voice), but this appears not to have been released commercially at the time. She also recorded the work in the USA in 1938.

== Later recordings ==
The entries in the following table are taken from the listings on the Bach Cantatas Website. Some recordings rely on choir without (or with few) solo voices. Choirs with one voice per part (OVPP) and orchestras playing on period instruments in historically informed performances are marked by green background.

Recordings of Christ lag in Todes Banden, BWV 4
Title	Conductor / Choir / Orchestra	Soloists	Label	Year	Choir type	Orch. type
J. S. Bach: Das Kantatenwerk – Sacred Cantatas Vol. 1	Kurt Thomas Thomanerchor Gewandhausorchester	Agnes Giebel; Marga Höffgen; Hans-Joachim Rotzsch; Theo Adam	Teldec	1959		
Les Grandes Cantates de J. S. Bach Vol. 8	Fritz Werner Heinrich-Schütz-Chor Heilbronn Pforzheim Chamber Orchestra	Claudia Hellmann; Helmut Krebs; Jakob Stämpfli	Erato Records	1961		Chamber
J. S. Bach: Himmelskönig, sei willkommen (BWV 182; Christ lag in Todesbanden (BWV 4)	Wilhelm Ehmann Westfälische Kantorei Deutsche Bachsolisten	Herrad Wehrung; Frauke Haasemann; Johannes Hoefflin; Wilhelm Pommerien	Cantate	1964		
Bach Cantatas Vol. 2 – Easter	Karl Richter Münchener Bach-Chor Münchener Bach-Orchester	Dietrich Fischer-Dieskau	Archiv Produktion	1968		
J. S. Bach: Das Kantatenwerk – Sacred Cantatas Vol. 1	Nikolaus Harnoncourt: Wiener Sängerknaben; Chorus Viennensis; Concentus Musicus Wien	Soloist of the Wiener Sängerknaben; Paul Esswood; Kurt Equiluz; Max van Egmond	Teldec	1971		Period
J. S. Bach: Cantatas	John Eliot Gardiner Monteverdi Choir English Baroque Soloists	Stephen Varcoe	Erato	1980		Period
Die Bach Kantate Vol. 13	Helmuth Rilling Gächinger Kantorei Bach-Collegium Stuttgart	Edith Wiens; Carolyn Watkinson; Peter Schreier; Wolfgang Schöne	Hänssler	1980		
J. S. Bach: Oster-Oratorium	Andrew Parrott Taverner Consort Taverner Players	Emily Van Evera; Caroline Trevor; Charles Daniels; David Thomas	Virgin Classics	1993	OVPP-RP	Period
J. S. Bach: Complete Cantatas Vol. 1	Ton Koopman Amsterdam Baroque Orchestra & Choir	Barbara Schlick; Kai Wessel; Guy de Mey; Klaus Mertens	Antoine Marchand	1994		Period
J. S. Bach: Cantatas Vol. 1	Masaaki Suzuki Bach Collegium Japan	Yumiko Kurisu; Akira Tachikawa; Koki Katano; Peter Kooy	BIS	1995		Period
J. S. Bach: Christ lag in Todesbanden; Lobet den Herrn; Himmelskönig sei willkommen	Philippe Pierlot Choeur de Chambre de Namur Ricercar Consort	Greta De Reyghere; Steve Dugardin; Ian Honeyman; Max van Egmond	Ricercar	1995	Chamber	Period
Bach Edition Vol. 20 – Cantatas Vol. 11	Pieter Jan Leusink Holland Boys Choir Netherlands Bach Collegium	Ruth Holton; Sytse Buwalda; Nico van der Meel; Bas Ramselaar	Brilliant Classics	2000		Period
J. S. Bach: Actus Tragicus – Cantatas BWV 4, 12, 106 & 196	Konrad Junghänel Cantus Cölln	Johanna Koslowsky; Elisabeth Popien; Gerd Türk; Wilfried Jochens; Stephan Schreckenberger	Harmonia Mundi France	2000	OVPP	Period
Bach/Webern: Ricercar	Christoph Poppen Hilliard Ensemble Münchener Kammerorchester	Monika Mauch; David James; Rogers Covey-Crump; Gordon Jones	ECM	2001	OVPP	Chamber
Aus der Notenbibliothek von Johann Sebastian Bach, Vol. II	Thomas Hengelbrock Balthasar-Neumann-Chor Balthasar-Neumann-Ensemble	Dorothee Mields; Hans Jörg Mammel; Wolf Matthias Friedrich	Hänssler	2001		Period
J. S. Bach Early Cantatas Volume I	Purcell Quartet	Emma Kirkby; Michael Chance; Charles Daniels; Peter Harvey	Chandos	2004	OVPP	Period
Bach J. S: Cantatas Vol 22	John Eliot Gardiner Monteverdi Choir English Baroque Soloists		Soli Deo Gloria	2000		Period
Das Kirchenjahr mit Bach, Vol. 5: Ostern · Easter	Georg Christoph Biller Thomanerchor Gewandhausorchester	Soloists of the Thomanercchor; Stefan Kahle; Martin Petzold; Gotthold Schwarz	Rondeau	2012		
