= Gottes Zeit ist die allerbeste Zeit, BWV 106 =

Church cantata by Johann Sebastian Bach (c. 1708)

Gottes Zeit ist die allerbeste Zeit
- BWV 106
- Church cantata by J. S. Bach
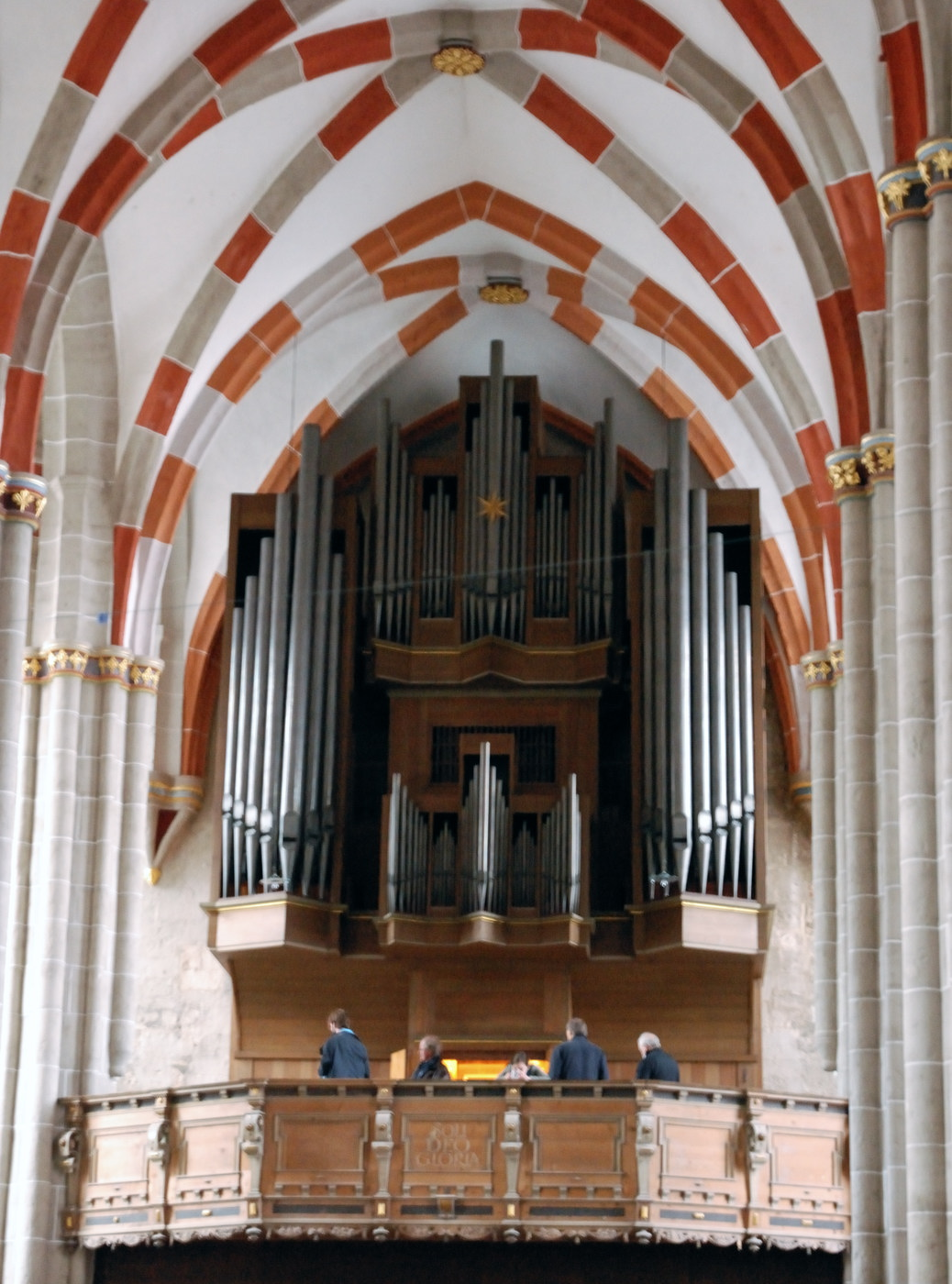
- Organ of the church Divi Blasii, Mühlhausen
- Other name: Actus tragicus
- Occasion: Funeral
- Bible text: Acts 17:28; Psalms 90:12; Isaiah 38:1; Jesus Sirach 14:17; Revelation 22:20; Luke 18:31,34; Psalms 31:5
- Chorale: "Ich hab mein Sach Gott heimgestellt" by Johann Leon; "Mit Fried und Freud ich fahr dahin" by Martin Luther; "In dich hab ich gehoffet, Herr" by Adam Reusner
- Composed: 1707–1708: Mühlhausen
- Movements: 4
- Vocal: SATB solo and choir
- Instrumental: 2 recorders; violas da gamba; continuo

Gottes Zeit ist die allerbeste Zeit (God's time is the very best time), BWV 106, (Note: "BWV" is Bach-Werke-Verzeichnis, a thematic catalogue of Bach's works.) also known as Actus tragicus, is an early sacred cantata composed by Johann Sebastian Bach in Mühlhausen, intended for a funeral.

The earliest source for the composition is a copied manuscript dated 1768, therefore the date of the composition is not certain. Research leads to a funeral of a former mayor of Mühlhausen on 16 September 1708. The text is a carefully compiled juxtaposition of biblical texts, three quotations from the Old Testament and four from the New Testament, combined with funeral hymns, of which two are sung and one is quoted instrumentally. The source for the opening movement was unknown for a long time. Bach scholar Markus Rathey (Yale University) was able to determine that it had been written by theologian David von Schweinitz. Bach scored the work for four vocal parts and a small ensemble of Baroque instruments: two recorders, two violas da gamba and continuo. The work is opened by an instrumental Sonatina, followed by through-composed sections which have been assigned to four movements. The structure is symmetrical around a turning point, when the lower voices, who contemplate the Old Covenant, are overcome by a soprano calling for Jesus.

== History ==
Although Bach's manuscript is lost, the work is agreed to be one of the earliest Bach cantatas, probably composed during the year he spent in Mühlhausen 1707/1708 as organist of the Divi Blasii church, at the age of 22. Various funerals known to have taken place at this time have been proposed as the occasion for the composition, for example that of his uncle Tobias Lämmerhirt from his mother's family, who died in Erfurt on 10 August 1707, and that of Adolph Strecker, a former mayor of Mühlhausen, whose funeral was 16 September 1708.

The earliest surviving manuscript, in the hand of Christian Friedrich Penzel, was copied in 1768 after Bach's death. It introduced the title Actus tragicus. The cantata was published in 1876 as part of the first complete edition of Bach's works: the Bach-Gesellschaft-Ausgabe, edited by Wilhelm Rust.

== Theme ==
The text consists of different Bible passages from the Old and New Testament, as well as individual verses of hymns by Martin Luther and Adam Reusner, which all together refer to finitude, preparation for death and dying. There are two distinct parts to the cantata: the view of the Old Testament on death shown in the first part is confronted by that of the New Testament in the second part, leading to a symmetrical structure. The juxtaposition of texts from the Old and New Testament appeared before in the Christliche Betschule (Christian school of prayer) by Johann Olearius. Markus Rathey, professor at the Yale Institute of Sacred Music, has argued that the sermon given at the funeral of Strecker is similar in ideas to the themes of the cantatas. This may be an indication that Bach composed the work for this occasion.

== Music ==
=== Structure and scoring ===
Bach scored the cantata for four vocal parts (soprano (S), alto (A), tenor (T), and bass (B)) and a chamber ensemble of Baroque instruments: two alto recorders (Fl), two violas da gamba (Vg), basso continuo. The duration is given as 23 minutes.

The sections comprising the cantata are traditionally grouped into four movements. The musicologist Carol Traupman-Carr notes: "Although movements are marked by tempo changes, occasionally key changes, meter changes, and double bar lines, Cantata 106 appears to be a continuous work. Bach helps create a more seamless effect by occasionally resolving the cadence of one section at the downbeat of another, thus blurring the beginnings and endings of traditional movements." The keys and tempo markings are taken from the first publication. The keys in the Neue Bach-Ausgabe and other more recent publications start in F major.

Movements of Gottes Zeit ist die allerbeste Zeit
Mvmt	No.	Title	Text	Type	Voices	Instr.	Key	Time	Tempo
1		Sonatina				2Fl 2Vg	E♭ major	common time	Molto adagio
2	2a	Gottes Zeit ist die allerbeste Zeit	David von Schweinitz; Acts 17:28	Chorus	SATB	2Fl 2Vg	E♭ major; C minor	3/4	–; Allegro; Adagio assai
2	2b	Ach, Herr, lehre uns bedenken	Psalms 90:12	Arioso	T	2Fl 2Vg	C minor		Lento
2	2c	Bestelle dein Haus	Isaiah 38:1	Aria	B	2Fl 2Vg	C minor	3/8	Vivace
2	2d	Es ist der alte Bund; Ja, komm, Herr Jesu, komm! Ich hab mein Sach Gott heimgestellt (instrumental)	Jesus Sirach 14:17; Revelation 22:20; Johann Leon	Chorus & Solo	ATB S	2Fl 2Vg	F minor	common time	Andante
3	3a	In deine Hände befehl ich meinen Geist du hast mich erlöset, Herr, du getreuer Gott.	Luke 23:46; Psalms 31:5	Aria	A	2Vg	B♭ minor	common time	
3	3b	Heute wirst du mit mir im Paradies sein Mit Fried und Freud ich fahr dahin	Luke 23:43; Martin Luther after Nunc dimittis	Arioso & chorale	B A	2Vg	C minor	common time	
4		Glorie, Lob, Ehr und Herrlichkeit	Adam Reusner	Chorus	SATB	2Fl 2Vg	E♭ major	common time	–; Allegro

=== Movements ===
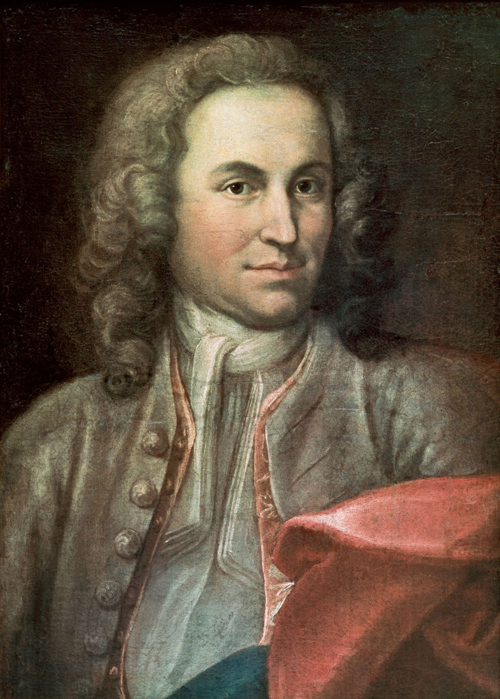
Portrait of the young Bach (disputed)

==== 1 ====
In the opening sonatina, marked Molto adagio, two obbligato alto recorders mournfully echo each other over a sonorous background of viola da gambas and continuo.

==== 2 ====
The first vocal movement combines several aspects of getting ready to die, based mostly on texts from the Old Testament. Bach expresses their ideas in a variety of musical form and scoring. The movement opens (2a) on a text in free poetry by theologian David von Schweinitz, "Gottes Zeit ist die allerbeste Zeit" (God's time is the best of all times). The chorus has no initial tempo marking, but has a fugal section marked Allegro, and the end is Adagio assai.

The thought from Psalm 90 (2b), "Ach, Herr, lehre uns bedenken, daß wir sterben müssen" (Ah, Lord, teach us to consider that we must die) is rendered as an arioso of the tenor, marked Lento. The melodic line is broken by rests of reflection.

The warning to be prepared for death (2c) from Isaiah, "Bestelle dein Haus; denn du wirst sterben" (Put your house in order; for you will die), is performed as an aria by the bass, marked Vivace. Arpeggios of the recorder accompany the voice which has been described as "evocative of the command of God".

Marked Andante, the movement concludes (2d) with the central piece in the symmetrical composition. It presents a contrast: while the lower choral voices recall the Old Covenant, "Es ist der alte Bund: Mensch, du mußt sterben!" (It is the ancient law: human, you must die!), based on Jesus Sirach, the solo soprano turns to accepting death as a union with Jesus, singing three times "Ja, komm, Herr Jesu, komm!" (Yes, come, Lord Jesus!). The personal decision is supported by the instrumental quotation in the recorders of Johann Leon's hymn "Ich hab mein Sach Gott heimgestellt" (I have brought my affairs home to God). The final call to Jesus closes the movement, leading to a long rest. Musicologist Wendy Heller writes:

Bach allows the confident soprano the final word, one that even silences the continuo; the passage concludes with an ornamented cadential passage in semiquaver triplets that arrives with tentative optimism and a distinct lack of completion ...

==== 3 ====
The second vocal movement is a similar combination of ideas, now mostly from the New Testament. It quotes twice what Jesus said on the cross according to the Gospel of Luke. The first quotation (3a), "In deine Hände befehl ich meinen Geist" (Into Your hands I commit my spirit), with an added explanation "du hast mich erlöset, Herr, du getreuer Gott" (You have redeemed me, Lord, faithful God), from Psalm 31, is rendered as an alto aria.

The second quotation (3b), "Heute wirst du mit mir im Paradies sein" (Today you will be with Me in Paradise), is a bass arioso, supported by Martin Luther's hymn "Mit Fried und Freud ich fahr dahin" (With peace and joy I depart), after the Nunc dimittis (also following Luke), sung by the alto as a cantus firmus.

==== 4 ====
The work concludes with the closing seventh stanza of Adam Reusner's hymn "In dich hab ich gehoffet, Herr", "Glorie, Lob, Ehr und Herrlichkeit" (Glory, praise, honor, and majesty), as a choral movement, but not a simple four-part setting. Introduced by an instrumental passage recalling motifs from the Sonatina, the first lines of the hymn are set for four parts. The movement ends in a double fugue on Amen marked Allegro. The musicologist Julian Mincham notes that the fugal section became the "major focus of the piece".

=== Evaluation ===
The cantata ranks among Bach's most important works. The Bach scholar Alfred Dürr called the cantata "a work of genius such as even great masters seldom achieve... The Actus tragicus belongs to the great musical literature of the world".

== Recordings ==
The cantata can be performed with only four singers, as in the recording by Joshua Rifkin, while other recordings feature a choir with multiple voices to a part. The following entries are taken from the listing on the Bach Cantatas Website. Choirs with one voice per part (OVPP) and instrumental groups playing period instruments in historically informed performances are marked by green background.

Recordings of Gottes Zeit ist die allerbeste Zeit, BWV 106
Title	Conductor / Choir / Orchestra	Soloists	Label	Year	Choir type	Instr.
Cantata BWV 106	Günther Ramin Thomanerchor Gewandhausorchester	soloists of the Thomanerchor; Hans-Joachim Rotzsch; Johannes Oettel	Fidelio	1953		
J. S. Bach: Kantaten 106 · 182	Jürgen Jürgens Monteverdi-Chor Leonhardt-Consort	Julia Falk; Bert van t'Hoff; Jacques Villisech	Telefunken	1963		
Les Grandes Cantates de J.S. Bach Vol. 19	Fritz Werner Heinrich-Schütz-Chor Heilbronn Pforzheim Chamber Orchestra	Edith Selig; Claudia Hellmann; Georg Jelden; Jakob Stämpfli	Erato	1964		
Johann Sebastian Bach: Kantaten "Actus Tragicus", BWV 106	Karl Richter Münchener Bach-Chor Münchener Bach-Orchester	Hertha Töpper; Ernst Haefliger; Theo Adam	Archiv Production	1966		Chamber
Die Bach Kantate Vol. 68	Helmuth Rilling Gächinger Kantorei Bach-Collegium Stuttgart	Eva Csapó; Hanna Schwarz; Adalbert Kraus; Wolfgang Schöne	Hänssler	1975		
J. S. Bach: Das Kantatenwerk • Complete Cantatas • Les Cantates, Folge / Vol. 26	Gustav Leonhardt: Knabenchor Hannover; Collegium Vocale; Leonhardt-Consort	Soloists of Knabenchor Hannover; Marius van Altena; Max van Egmond	Teldec	1980		Period
Bach: Actus Tragicus – Cantatas 106, 131, 99, 56, 82 & 158	Joshua Rifkin The Bach Ensemble	Steven Rickards; Ann Monoyios; Jan Opalach; Edmund Brownless	Decca	1985	OVPP	Period
Bach: Funeral Cantatas	John Eliot Gardiner Monteverdi Choir English Baroque Soloists	Nancy Argenta; Michael Chance; Anthony Rolfe-Johnson; Stephen Varcoe	Archiv Produktion	1989		Period
J. S. Bach: Cantatas Vol. 2	Masaaki Suzuki Bach Collegium Japan	Aki Yanagisawa; Yoshikazu Mera; Gerd Türk; Peter Kooy	BIS	1995		Period
Bach Edition Vol. 8 – Cantatas Vol. 3	Pieter Jan Leusink Holland Boys Choir Netherlands Bach Collegium	Marjon Strijk; Sytse Buwalda; Knut Schoch; Bas Ramselaar	Brilliant Classics	1999		Period
Bach: Actus Tragicus – Cantatas BWV 4, 12, 106 & 196	Konrad Junghänel Cantus Cölln	Johanna Koslowsky; Elisabeth Popien; Gerd Türk; Wilfried Jochens; Stephan Schreckenberger	Harmonia Mundi France	2000	OVPP	Period
