= Ach! ich sehe, itzt, da ich zur Hochzeit gehe, BWV 162 =

Church cantata by Johann Sebastian Bach

Ach! ich sehe, itzt, da ich zur Hochzeit gehe
- BWV 162
- Church cantata by J. S. Bach
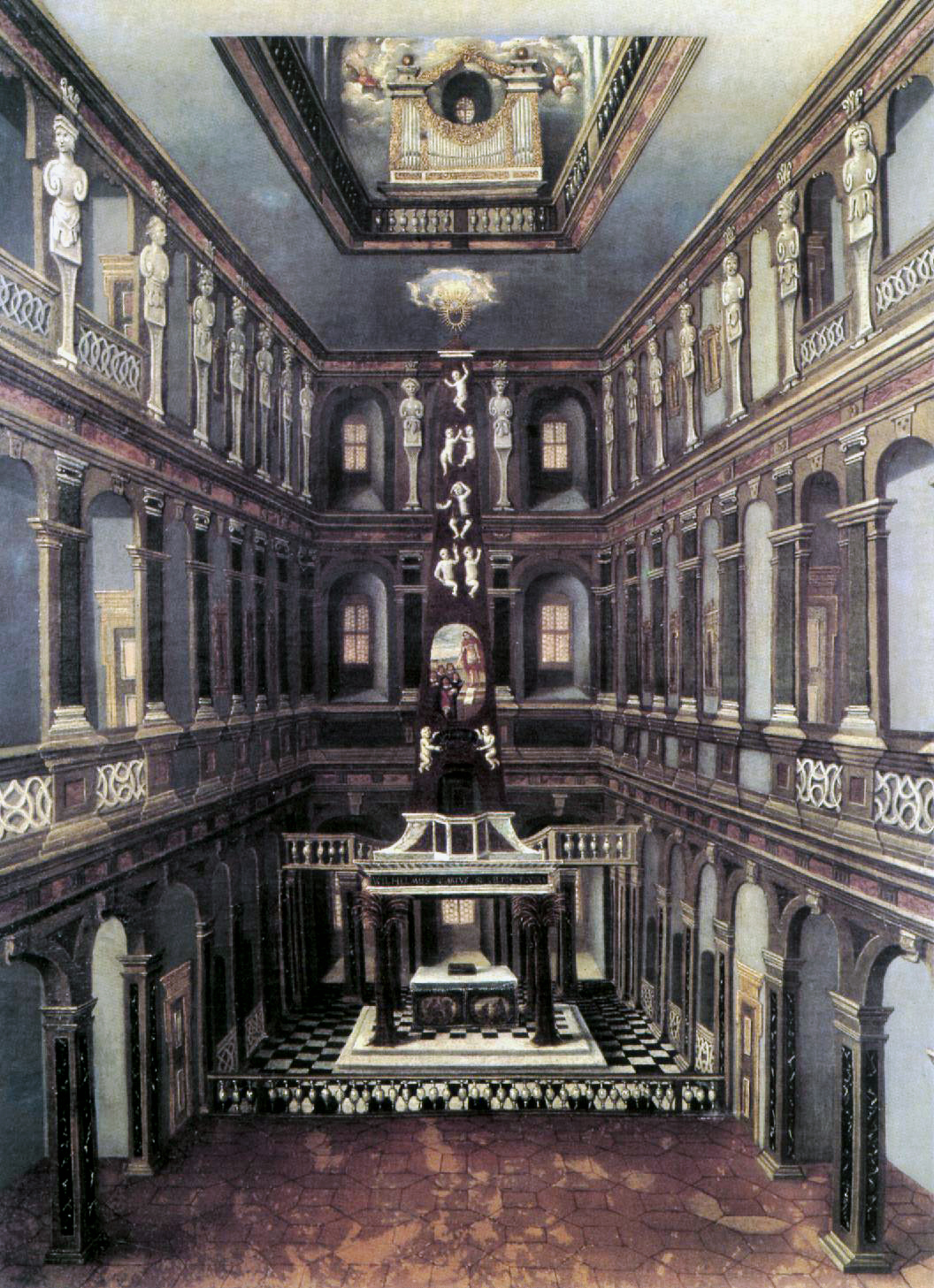
- The Schlosskirche in Weimar
- Occasion: 20th Sunday after Trinity
- Cantata text: Salomon Franck
- Chorale: by Johann Rosenmüller
- Composed: 1715?: Weimar
- Movements: 6
- Scoring: S T B soloists; SATB choir; corno da tirarsi; 2 violins; 2 violas; continuo

Johann Sebastian Bach composed the church cantata Ach! ich sehe, itzt, da ich zur Hochzeit gehe (Ah! I see, now, when I go to the wedding), BWV 162, in Weimar for the 20th Sunday after Trinity and first performed it in 1715 or 1716.

== History and words ==
On 2 March 1714 Bach was appointed concertmaster of the Weimar court capelle of the co-reigning dukes Wilhelm Ernst and Ernst August of Saxe-Weimar. As concertmaster, he assumed the principal responsibility for composing new works, specifically cantatas for the Schlosskirche (palace church), on a monthly schedule. He wrote the cantata for the 20th Sunday after Trinity. The prescribed readings for the Sunday were from the Epistle to the Ephesians, "walk circumspectly, ... filled with the Spirit" (Ephesians 5:15–21), and from the Gospel of Matthew, the parable of the great banquet (Matthew 22:1–14). The cantata text was provided by the court poet Salomon Franck, published in Evangelisches Andachts-Opffer (1715). He refers to the gospel and reflects how essential it is to follow the loving invitation of the Lord. Franck's language is rich in contrasts, such as Seelengift und Himmelsbrot (poison for the soul and bread of heaven), and of images derived from the Bible, such as "Der Himmel ist sein Thron" (Heaven is his throne) after Isaiah 66:1. The closing chorale is the seventh stanza of Johann Rosenmüller's hymn "Alle Menschen müssen sterben" (1652).

Bach first performed the cantata on 3 November 1715 (according to the musicologist Alfred Dürr) or on 25 October 1716. Bach performed the cantata again on 10 October 1723 in his first year in Leipzig in a revised version, including a corno da tirarsi, a baroque wind instrument mentioned only in Bach's music and thought to have been similar to the slide trumpet (tromba da tirarsi). Bach's score is lost, and some parts seem to be missing as well.

== Scoring and structure ==
Bach structured the work in six movements. Like other cantatas written during this period in Weimar, it is scored for a small ensemble, four soloists, and a Baroque instrumental ensemble of corno da tirarsi (likely added in Leipzig), two violins, viola, and basso continuo, including bassoon in movement 1. Only the chorale is set for four voices.

1. Aria (bass): Ach! ich sehe, itzt, da ich zur Hochzeit gehe
2. Recitative (tenor): O großes Hochzeitfest
3. Aria (soprano): Jesu, Brunnquell aller Gnaden
4. Recitative (alto): Mein Jesu, laß mich nicht
5. Duet aria (alto, tenor): In meinem Gott bin ich erfreut
6. Chorale: Ach, ich habe schon erblicket

== Music ==
The cantata opens with a bass aria in A minor, accompanied by three instruments in a polyphonic setting, the two violins and the viola (with the corno). The motif for the first words is present most of the time. The soprano aria seems to lack a part for an obbligato instrument. For the Bach Cantata Pilgrimage of the Monteverdi Choir (and John Eliot Gardiner), Robert Levin reconstructed a version for flauto traverso and oboe d'amore. The duet is also accompanied only by the continuo, but seems complete. The melody of the closing chorale is rare elsewhere, but appeared in Weimar not only in this work, but also in a chorale prelude of Johann Gottfried Walther.

== Recordings ==
- Die Bach Kantate Vol. 54, Helmuth Rilling, Frankfurter Kantorei, Bach-Collegium Stuttgart, Arleen Augér, Alyce Rogers, Kurt Equiluz, Wolfgang Schöne, Hänssler 1976
- J. S. Bach: Das Kantatenwerk – Sacred Cantatas Vol. 8, Nikolaus Harnoncourt, Vienna Boys Choir, Concentus Musicus Wien, boy soprano, Paul Esswood, Kurt Equiluz, Robert Holl, Teldec 1986
- J. S. Bach: Complete Cantatas Vol. 3, Ton Koopman, Amsterdam Baroque Orchestra & Choir, Barbara Schlick, Elisabeth von Magnus, Paul Agnew, Klaus Mertens, Antoine Marchand 1995
- J. S. Bach: Cantatas Vol. 3, Masaaki Suzuki, Bach Collegium Japan, Yumiko Kurisu, Yoshikazu Mera, Makoto Sakurada, Peter Kooy, BIS 1996
- Bach Cantatas Vol. 11, John Eliot Gardiner, Monteverdi Choir, English Baroque Soloists, Magdalena Kožená, Sara Mingardo, Christoph Genz, Peter Harvey, Soli Deo Gloria 2000

== Sources ==
- Ach! ich sehe, itzt, da ich zur Hochzeit gehe, BWV 162: performance by the Netherlands Bach Society (video and background information)
- Ach! ich sehe, itzt, da ich zur Hochzeit gehe, BWV 162: Scores at the International Music Score Library Project
- Ach! ich sehe, itzt, da ich zur Hochzeit gehe BWV 162; BC A 148 / Sacred cantata (20th Sunday after Trinity) Bach Digital
- Cantata BWV 162 Ach! ich sehe, itzt, da ich zur Hochzeit gehe: history, scoring, sources for text and music, translations to various languages, discography, discussion, Bach Cantatas Website
- BWV 162 Ach! ich sehe, itzt, da ich zur Hochzeit gehe, BWV 162: English translation, University of Vermont
- Ach! ich sehe, itzt, da ich zur Hochzeit gehe: text, scoring, University of Alberta (in German)
- Chapter 22 BWV 162 Ach, ich sehe, itzt, da ich zur Hochzeit gehe / Ah, I see as I proceed to the marriage. Julian Mincham, 2010
- Luke Dahn: BWV 162.6 bach-chorales.com
