= Rosa Lamoreaux =

American singer

- Occupation: Classical soprano
- Organizations: Hesperus; Vocal Arts Quartet; Folger Consort
- Awards: Washington Area Music Awards 2009

Rosa Lamoreaux is an American soprano, appearing mostly in concert, both as a soloist and in vocal ensembles. She has appeared at festivals such as the Carmel Bach Festival and the Rheingau Musik Festival, and has recorded works by Johann Sebastian Bach with different conductors.

== Career ==
Lamoreaux has performed often in Washington at the Corcoran Gallery, the Kennedy Center, the National Cathedral, the National Gallery of Art and the Smithsonian Institution.

She has sung as a member of vocal ensembles such as the Vocal Arts Quartet, with Beverly Benso, Samuel Gordon and Robert Kennedy, performing music from the Renaissance to contemporary. They appeared at many European Music Festivals including the Rheingau Musik Festival. She has performed with Hesperus, an ensemble for early music and folk music. They performed for example live music for the 1923 silent film The Hunchback of Notre Dame, a compilation of music by Hildegard von Bingen, Guillaume de Machaut, Guillaume Dufay and others. Lamoreaux has been a frequent guest with the Folger Consort for Early Music. She took part in celebrating the 300th anniversary of J. S. Bach's birth in Leipzig, Berlin and Halle with the Washington Bach Consort.

Lamoreaux has regularly performed with choral groups such as the Master Singers of Westchesters, conducted by Les Robinson Hadsell. She sang in 1987 the first soprano part in Mozart's Great Mass in C minor alongside Elisabeth Braden, Michael Hume and Nathaniel Watson, in 1989 in works by Vivaldi with Pamela Dellal, in 1990 Handel's Utrecht Te Deum and Haydn's St. Cecilia Mass, and in 1991 was the soprano in Mozart's Vesperae solennes de Dominica and Requiem with Beverly Benso and Patrick Romano.

In 1997, she was a soloist in Bach's a recording of Bach's Mass in B minor and Magnificat with The Bach Choir of Bethlehem conducted by Greg Funfgeld, and the Messe solennelle by Berlioz, among others. Recordings with vocal ensembles include Four Centuries of Song with the National Gallery Vocal Art, and Spain in the New World and I Love Lucette, theatre songs of the French Renaissance with Hesperus. She also recorded Gentle Annie songs by Stephen Foster and Charles Ives. She has appeared in two recordings conducted by Bruno Weil at the Carmel Bach Festival, one in 1996 of the solo cantata Mein Herze schwimmt im Blut, BWV 199 that appeared on the compilation Best of the Fest, Vol. 1, and the other as a soloist in Bach's Mass in B minor in 1998.

Lamoreaux has taught voice at Princeton University, the Michigan State University, and the Smithsonian Institution, among others. She won the 2009 Washington Area Music Award in the category "Classical Vocal Soloist".
