= Aki Yanagisawa =

Japanese soprano

Aki Yanagisawa (Japanese: 柳沢 亜紀, Yanagisawa Aki) is a Japanese soprano.

A graduate of the Tokyo National University of Fine Arts and Music, she finished third in the fifth annual Japanese Vocal Music Competition in 1993. She is a member of the Bach Collegium Japan, and performed in their recordings of the complete Bach cantatas, more frequently as a member of the chorus than a soloist. For example, she sings in the choir in the first volume recorded in June/July 1995; in the second volume recorded later the same year she sings as a soloist in Gottes Zeit ist die allerbeste Zeit, BWV 106.

She has performed as a soloist in George Frideric Handel’s Messiah, Beethoven’s Symphony No. 9 and on the opera stage as Suzanna in Mozart’s The Marriage of Figaro.
