= Katano (disambiguation) =

Katano is a city in Osaka, Japan.

Katano may also refer to:

- Hiromichi Katano (born 1982), Japanese football player
- Koki Katano (born 1968), Japanese tenor
- Katano Station, a Kitakyushu monorail station in Kitakyushu, Japan

== See also ==
- Katana (disambiguation)
