= Psalm 31 =

Biblical psalm

- "In thee, O LORD, do I put my trust"
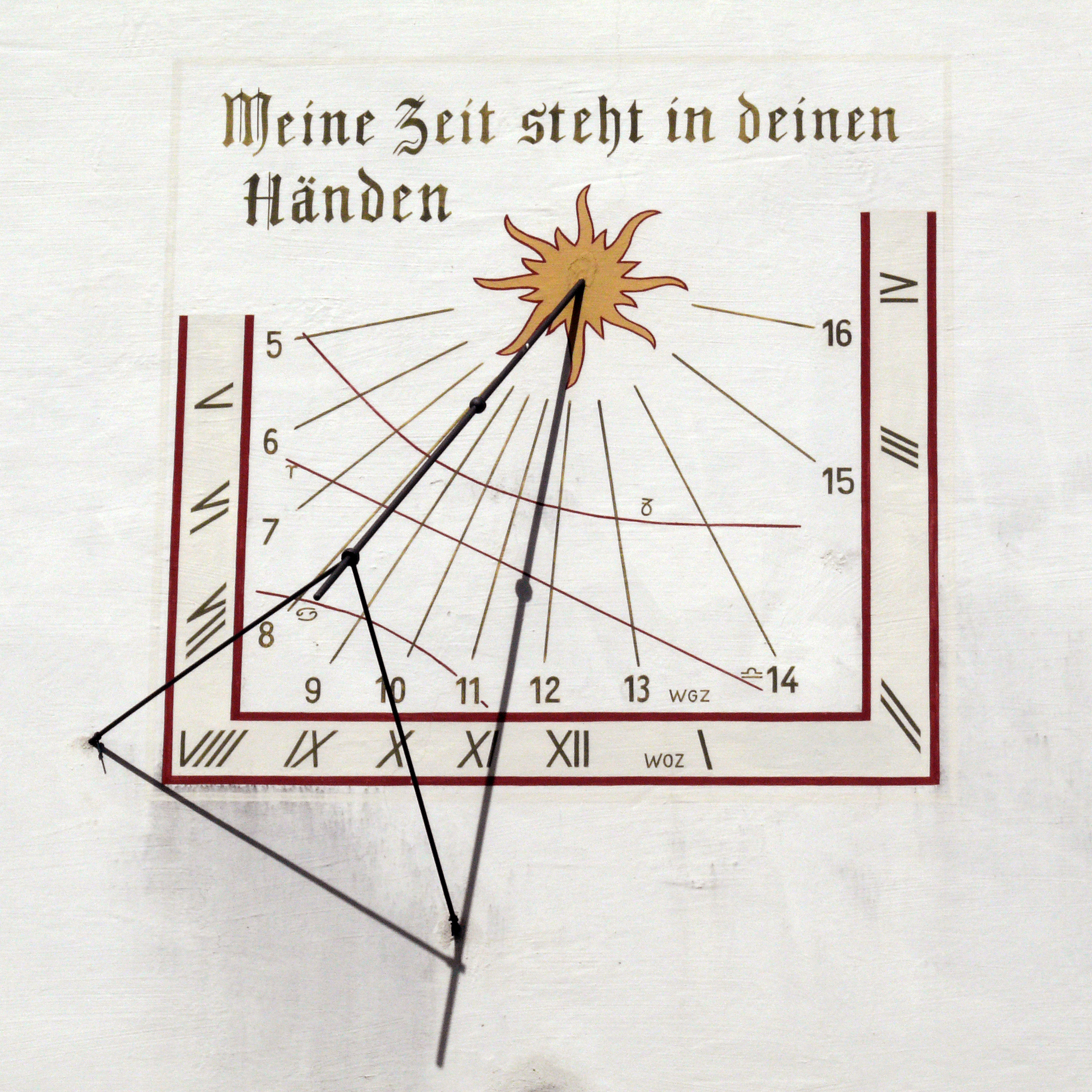
- German words from Psalms 31:15 ("My times are in thy hand") on a sundial on the tower of the Marienkirche in St. Johann
- Other name: Psalm 30 (Vulgate); "In te Domine speravi"
- Related: "In dich hab ich gehoffet, Herr"
- Language: Hebrew (original)

Psalm 31
- ← Psalm 30 Psalm 32 →
- Book: Book of Psalms
- Hebrew Bible part: Ketuvim
- Order in the Hebrew part: 1
- Category: Sifrei Emet
- Christian Bible part: Old Testament
- Order in the Christian part: 19

Psalm 31 is the 31st psalm of the Book of Psalms, beginning in English in the King James Version: "In thee, O LORD, do I put my trust". In Latin, it is known as "In te Domine speravi". The Book of Psalms is part of the third section of the Hebrew Bible, and a book of the Christian Old Testament. In the slightly different numbering system used in the Greek Septuagint version of the Bible, and in its Latin translation, the Vulgate, this psalm is Psalm 30. The first verse in the Hebrew text indicates that it was composed by David.

The psalm forms a regular part of Jewish, Catholic, Lutheran, Anglican and other Protestant liturgies. Metrical hymns in English and German were derived from the psalm, such as "In dich hab ich gehoffet, Herr" and "Blest be the name of Jacob's God". The psalm has often been set to music, both completely and using specific sections such as "Illumina faciem tuam" (Make thy face to shine). Vocal settings were written by Johann Crüger, Heinrich Schütz, Joseph Haydn, and Felix Mendelssohn, among others.

"Into thine hand I commit my spirit" were the last words of many Christian figures, including Jesus, Saint Bernard, Jerome of Prague, and Martin Luther. "My times are in Thy hand" also became a frequently quoted phrase. Psalm 31:24 be strong and take heart all you who hope in the Lord.

"In te Domine speravi", the Psalm's first line in Latin, is also the final line of the ancient Te Deum hymn. Rendered in English frequently as, "O Lord, in thee have I trusted: let me never be confounded," the Te Deum in both the Latin and English texts have been set numerous times to music, notably by Hector Berlioz in Latin and John Rutter in English.

== Background and themes ==
The author of the psalm is identified by the first verse in the Hebrew, "To the chief musician, a song of David". It was likely written while David was fleeing from Saul. On the basis of the wording of the Psalm, Charles and Emilie Briggs claim that "The author certainly knew Jeremiah, Isaiah, Ezekiel, and many Psalms of the Persian period. We cannot put the composition earlier than the troubles of Israel preceding the reforms of Nehemiah". The Persian period began in 539 BC, and Nehemiah's reforms are dated to about 445 BC.

In the psalm, David calls God his "rock" (which shields him from attack) and his "fortress" (which protects him on all sides). David also cites his physical ailments—"[h]is eyesight has dimmed from his troubles, and he has endured physical as well as spiritual deprivation. His life has been a continuous flow of trouble, causing him to age prematurely"—and acknowledges that these afflictions were sent by Heaven to encourage him to atone for his sins. The psalm ends on a note of hope: "The faithful should love G-d because He protects them, but He carefully repays the arrogant what they deserve".

In the New Testament, the four evangelists each cite the last words of Jesus; according to Luke the Evangelist, these last words came from verse 5 (KJV) of Psalm 31, "Into thine hand I commit my spirit". Similarly, according to nineteenth-century English Anglican bishop John James Stewart Perowne, this verse constituted the last words of many Christian figures, including Polycarp, Saint Bernard, Jerome of Prague, Martin Luther, and Philip Melanchthon. James Limburg notes that this makes the psalm suitable for preaching, and that it is often intoned at the time of death.

== Uses ==
=== Old Testament ===
Verses 2–4 (in the Hebrew) are also the first 3 verses of Psalm 71. Jeremiah repeats the words magor mesaviv (Hebrew: מגור מסביב, "terror on all sides") from verse 14 (in the Hebrew; verse 13 in English Bibles) in Jeremiah and Lamentations.

=== New Testament ===
Verse 5 (KJV) is quoted in Luke 23:46, as the last words of Jesus before he dies.

Saint Stephen prays a similar but modified version of Psalm 31:6 in Acts 7:59 "Lord Jesus receive my spirit". Stephen also prays for forgiveness for those causing his death, as Jesus did.

=== Judaism ===
Verse 6 (in the Hebrew) is part of Baruch Adonai L'Olam in the evening prayer. It is also part of the Bedtime Shema. The phrase be-yado afkid ruchi ("Into his hand I commit my spirit") starts the last verse of Adon Olam.

Verses 15 and 17 are included in the preliminary morning prayers.

Verse 20 is one of the verses said after learning Mishnayos for a deceased person.

In the Siddur Sfas Emes, this psalm is said as a prayer for the well-being of an ailing person.

=== Catholic ===
The first line of the Psalm in Latin, "In te Domine speravi", became the final line of the Te Deum, which has often been set to music. Verses 15 and 16, "Illumina faciem tuam" (Make thy face to shine), is a communion verse for Septuagesima.

=== Protestant ===
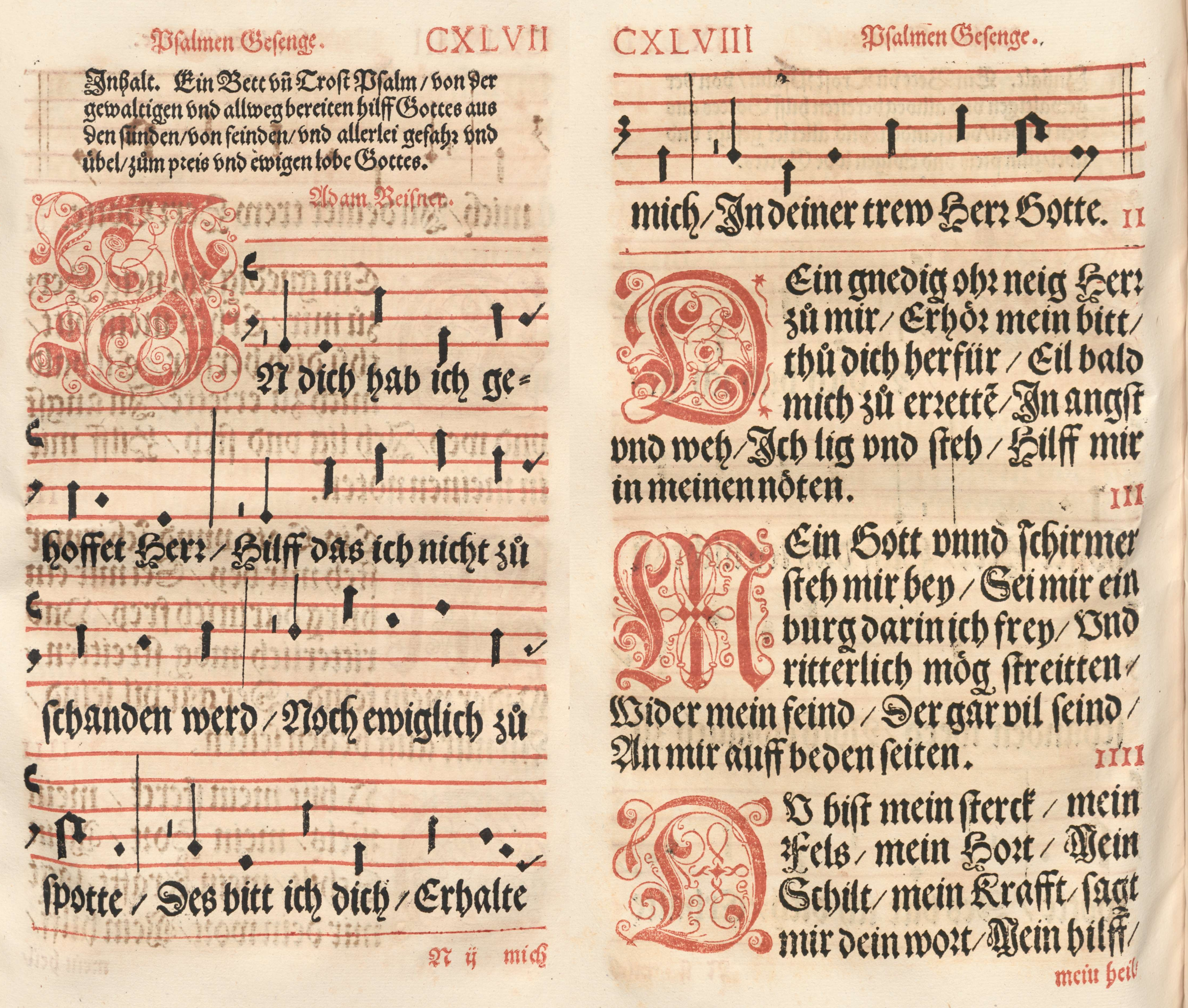
Text and melody of the hymn "In dich hab ich gehoffet, Herr", from Das Gros Kirchen Gesangbuch (The Main Church Hymnbook), Strasburg, 1565

Adam Reusner wrote a rhymed paraphrase of the first six verses of Psalm 31, "In dich hab ich gehoffet, Herr" ("literally: "For you I have hoped, Lord") as a Psalmlied, a song in the native language to be sung in place of the Latin psalm recitation in the former church, published in 1533. It was translated to English in several versions, including "In Thee, Lord, have I put my trust" by Catherine Winkworth.

In the Church of England's Book of Common Prayer, this psalm is appointed to be read on the morning of the sixth day of the month. Verses 1 to 5 are used in the Church of England's Office of Night Prayer (Compline).

=== Other ===
Verse 15 (KJV), "My times are in Thy hand", became a frequently quoted phrase. A hymn with the title "My times are in thy hand" by William Freeman Lloyd was published in 1873. In 1891, the preacher Charles Haddon Spurgeon based an essay on the thought. In a 2013 article in the German weekly Die Zeit, Margot Käßmann quoted "Meine Zeit steht in deinen Händen" as a call to see that a lifetime is a gift, and of unknown duration, to be used responsibly in free decision, for the community.

== Musical settings ==
=== Classical ===
Heinrich Isaac composed a setting of verses 15 and 16, "Illumina faciem tuam" for four-part choir, published in Choralis Constantinus in 1550. Carlo Gesualdo composed a setting of these verses for five-part choir (SATTB), published in his Sacrae cantiones in 1603.

Hans Leo Hassler composed a setting of the complete psalm in Latin for three four-part choirs, published in Sacrae Symphoniae in 1598. Heinrich Schütz set the same hymn in the Becker Psalter, SWV 128, published in 1628. He set the complete psalm in Latin for solo voice and instruments, published in Symphoniae sacrae in 1629. In 1648, Johann Rosenmüller published a setting of the first six verses in Latin for two sopranos and two tenors, two violins and continuo, in Kern-Sprüche. In te Domine speravi (Johann Rosenmüller) Johann Crüger set the German rhymed version, "In dich hab ich gehoffet, Herr", for four-part choir with optional instruments, published in 1649. In 1699, Marc-Antoine Charpentier composed 3e psalm du 1er nocturne du Mercredi saint, for soloists, chorus, strings and bc, H.228.

Joseph Haydn set three verses from a rhymed paraphrase in English by James Merrick, "Blest be the name of Jacob's God", for three voices, which was first published in 1794 in Improved Psalmody. Felix Mendelssohn set Psalm 31 to music a capella in English using the King James Version. Arthur Sullivan wrote an anthem for four voices and organ, setting the final two verses, "O love the Lord", first published in 1864.

=== Contemporary ===
Contemporary compositions which incorporate verses from Psalm 31 include "Two Sacred Songs" (1964) for voice and piano by Robert Starer, "In Thee O Lord Do I Put My Trust" (1964) by Jan Bender, and "Blessed be the Lord" (1973), an introit and anthem by Nancy Lupo.

In the 21st century, the hymn "Weite Räume meinen Füßen" is based on verse 8b which it uses as a refrain. Nobuaki Izawa set "Illumina faciem tuam" as a four-part motet, published in 2016. The Salisbury Cathedral Choir sang Psalm 31, with music composed by Walter Alcock, Richard Shephard, and Charles Frederick South, for a 2012 recording. The Psalms Project released its musical composition of Psalm 31 on the fourth volume of its album series in 2019.

== Text ==
The following table shows the Hebrew text of the Psalm with vowels, alongside the Koine Greek text in the Septuagint and the English translation from the King James Version. Note that the meaning can slightly differ between these versions, as the Septuagint and the Masoretic Text come from different textual traditions. (Note: A 1917 translation directly from Hebrew to English by the Jewish Publication Society can be found here or here, and an 1844 translation directly from the Septuagint by L. C. L. Brenton can be found here. Both translations are in the public domain.) In the Septuagint, this psalm is numbered Psalm 30.

#	Hebrew	English	Greek
(Note: In the Jewish verse numbering, the ascription of this psalm is verse 1, and the rest of the psalm begins from verse 2. However, the Christian verse numbering does not count the ascription as a separate verse.)	לַמְנַצֵּ֗חַ מִזְמ֥וֹר לְדָוִֽד׃	(To the chief Musician, A Psalm of David.)	Εἰς τὸ τέλος· ψαλμὸς τῷ Δαυΐδ· ἐκστάσεως.
1	בְּךָֽ־יְהֹוָ֣ה חָ֭סִיתִי אַל־אֵב֣וֹשָׁה לְעוֹלָ֑ם בְּצִדְקָתְךָ֥ פַלְּטֵֽנִי׃	In thee, O LORD, do I put my trust; let me never be ashamed: deliver me in thy righteousness.	ΕΠΙ σοί, Κύριε, ἤλπισα, μὴ καταισχυνθείην εἰς τὸν αἰῶνα· ἐν τῇ δικαιοσύνῃ σου ῥῦσαί με καὶ ἐξελοῦ με.
2	הַטֵּ֤ה אֵלַ֨י ׀ אׇזְנְךָ֮ מְהֵרָ֢ה הַצִּ֫ילֵ֥נִי הֱיֵ֤ה לִ֨י ׀ לְֽצוּר־מָ֭עוֹז לְבֵ֥ית מְצוּד֗וֹת לְהוֹשִׁיעֵֽנִי׃	Bow down thine ear to me; deliver me speedily: be thou my strong rock, for an house of defence to save me.	κλῖνον πρός με τὸ οὖς σου, τάχυνον τοῦ ἐξελέσθαι με· γενοῦ μοι εἰς Θεὸν ὑπερασπιστὴν καὶ εἰς οἶκον καταφυγῆς τοῦ σῶσαί με.
3	כִּֽי־סַלְעִ֣י וּמְצֽוּדָתִ֣י אָ֑תָּה וּלְמַ֥עַן שִׁ֝מְךָ֗ תַּֽנְחֵ֥נִי וּֽתְנַהֲלֵֽנִי׃	For thou art my rock and my fortress; therefore for thy name's sake lead me, and guide me.	ὅτι κραταίωμά μου καὶ καταφυγή μου εἶ σὺ καὶ ἕνεκεν τοῦ ὀνόματός σου ὁδηγήσεις με καὶ διαθρέψεις με·
4	תּוֹצִיאֵ֗נִי מֵרֶ֣שֶׁת ז֭וּ טָ֣מְנוּ לִ֑י כִּי־אַ֝תָּ֗ה מָעוּזִּֽי׃	Pull me out of the net that they have laid privily for me: for thou art my strength.	ἐξάξεις με ἐκ παγίδος ταύτης, ἧς ἔκρυψάν μοι, ὅτι σὺ εἶ ὁ ὑπερασπιστής μου, Κύριε.
5	בְּיָדְךָ֮ אַפְקִ֢יד ר֫וּחִ֥י פָּדִ֖יתָ אוֹתִ֥י יְהֹוָ֗ה אֵ֣ל אֱמֶֽת׃	Into thine hand I commit my spirit: thou hast redeemed me, O LORD God of truth.	εἰς χεῖράς σου παραθήσομαι τὸ πνεῦμά μου· ἐλυτρώσω με, Κύριε ὁ Θεὸς τῆς ἀληθείας.
6	שָׂנֵ֗אתִי הַשֹּׁמְרִ֥ים הַבְלֵי־שָׁ֑וְא וַ֝אֲנִ֗י אֶל־יְהֹוָ֥ה בָּטָֽחְתִּי׃	I have hated them that regard lying vanities: but I trust in the LORD.	ἐμίσησας τοὺς διαφυλάσσοντας ματαιότητας διακενῆς· ἐγὼ δὲ ἐπὶ τῷ Κυρίῳ ἤλπισα.
7	אָגִ֥ילָה וְאֶשְׂמְחָ֗ה בְּחַ֫סְדֶּ֥ךָ אֲשֶׁ֣ר רָ֭אִיתָ אֶת־עׇנְיִ֑י יָ֝דַ֗עְתָּ בְּצָר֥וֹת נַפְשִֽׁי׃	I will be glad and rejoice in thy mercy: for thou hast considered my trouble; thou hast known my soul in adversities;	ἀγαλλιάσομαι καὶ εὐφρανθήσομαι ἐπὶ τῷ ἐλέει σου, ὅτι ἐπεῖδες τὴν ταπείνωσίν μου, ἔσωσας ἐκ τῶν ἀναγκῶν τὴν ψυχήν μου
8	וְלֹ֣א הִ֭סְגַּרְתַּנִי בְּיַד־אוֹיֵ֑ב הֶעֱמַ֖דְתָּ בַמֶּרְחָ֣ב רַגְלָֽי׃	And hast not shut me up into the hand of the enemy: thou hast set my feet in a large room.	καὶ οὐ συνέκλεισάς με εἰς χεῖρας ἐχθρῶν, ἔστησας ἐν εὐρυχώρῳ τοὺς πόδας μου.
9	חׇנֵּ֥נִי יְהֹוָה֮ כִּ֤י צַ֫ר־לִ֥י עָשְׁשָׁ֖ה בְכַ֥עַס עֵינִ֗י נַפְשִׁ֥י וּבִטְנִֽי׃	Have mercy upon me, O LORD, for I am in trouble: mine eye is consumed with grief, yea, my soul and my belly.	ἐλέησόν με, Κύριε, ὅτι θλίβομαι· ἐταράχθη ἐν θυμῷ ὁ ὀφθαλμός μου, ἡ ψυχή μου καὶ ἡ γαστήρ μου.
10	כִּ֤י כָל֪וּ בְיָג֡וֹן חַיַּי֮ וּשְׁנוֹתַ֢י בַּאֲנָ֫חָ֥ה כָּשַׁ֣ל בַּעֲוֺנִ֣י כֹחִ֑י וַעֲצָמַ֥י עָשֵֽׁשׁוּ׃	For my life is spent with grief, and my years with sighing: my strength faileth because of mine iniquity, and my bones are consumed.	ὅτι ἐξέλιπεν ἐν ὀδύνῃ ἡ ζωή μου καὶ τὰ ἔτη μου ἐν στεναγμοῖς· ἠσθένησεν ἐν πτωχείᾳ ἡ ἰσχύς μου, καὶ τὰ ὀστᾶ μου ἐταράχθησαν.
11	מִכׇּל־צֹרְרַ֨י הָיִ֪יתִי חֶרְפָּ֡ה וְלִ֥שְׁכֵנַ֨י ׀ מְאֹד֮ וּפַ֢חַד לִֽמְיֻדָּ֫עָ֥י רֹאַ֥י בַּח֑וּץ נָדְד֥וּ מִמֶּֽנִּי׃	I was a reproach among all mine enemies, (Note: This wording uses the past tense but the words are generally translated in the present tense in modern versions, such as the New King James Version: I am a reproach among all my enemies.) but especially among my neighbours, and a fear to mine acquaintance: they that did see me without fled from me.	παρὰ πάντας τοὺς ἐχθρούς μου ἐγενήθην ὄνειδος καὶ τοῖς γείτοσί μου σφόδρα, καὶ φόβος τοῖς γνωστοῖς μου· οἱ θεωροῦντες με ἔξω ἔφυγον ἀπ᾿ ἐμοῦ.
12	נִ֭שְׁכַּחְתִּי כְּמֵ֣ת מִלֵּ֑ב הָ֝יִ֗יתִי כִּכְלִ֥י אֹבֵֽד׃	I am forgotten as a dead man out of mind: I am like a broken vessel.	ἐπελήσθην ὡσεὶ νεκρὸς ἀπὸ καρδίας, ἐγενήθην ὡσεὶ σκεῦος ἀπολωλός.
13	כִּ֤י שָׁמַ֨עְתִּי ׀ דִּבַּ֥ת רַבִּים֮ מָג֢וֹר מִסָּ֫בִ֥יב בְּהִוָּסְדָ֣ם יַ֣חַד עָלַ֑י לָקַ֖חַת נַפְשִׁ֣י זָמָֽמוּ׃	For I have heard the slander of many: fear was on every side: while they took counsel together against me, they devised to take away my life.	ὅτι ἤκουσα ψόγον πολλῶν παροικούντων κυκλόθεν· ἐν τῷ ἐπισυναχθῆναι αὐτοὺς ἅμα ἐπ᾿ ἐμὲ τοῦ λαβεῖν τὴν ψυχήν μου ἐβουλεύσαντο.
14	וַאֲנִ֤י ׀ עָלֶ֣יךָ בָטַ֣חְתִּי יְהֹוָ֑ה אָ֝מַ֗רְתִּי אֱלֹהַ֥י אָֽתָּה׃	But I trusted in thee, O LORD: I said, Thou art my God.	ἐγὼ δὲ ἐπὶ σοὶ ἤλπισα, Κύριε, εἶπα· σὺ εἶ ὁ Θεός μου.
15	בְּיָדְךָ֥ עִתֹּתָ֑י הַצִּ֘ילֵ֤נִי מִיַּד־א֝וֹיְבַ֗י וּמֵֽרֹדְפָֽי׃	My times are in thy hand: deliver me from the hand of mine enemies, and from them that persecute me.	ἐν ταῖς χερσί σου οἱ κλῆροί μου· ῥῦσαί με ἐκ χειρὸς ἐχθρῶν μου καὶ ἐκ τῶν καταδιωκόντων με.
16	הָאִ֣ירָה פָ֭נֶיךָ עַל־עַבְדֶּ֑ךָ ה֖וֹשִׁיעֵ֣נִי בְחַסְדֶּֽךָ׃	Make thy face to shine upon thy servant: save me for thy mercies' sake.	ἐπίφανον τὸ πρόσωπόν σου ἐπὶ τὸν δοῦλόν σου, σῶσόν με ἐν τῷ ἐλέει σου.
17	יְֽהֹוָ֗ה אַל־אֵ֭בוֹשָׁה כִּ֣י קְרָאתִ֑יךָ יֵבֹ֥שׁוּ רְ֝שָׁעִ֗ים יִדְּמ֥וּ לִשְׁאֽוֹל׃	Let me not be ashamed, O LORD; for I have called upon thee: let the wicked be ashamed, and let them be silent in the grave.	Κύριε, μὴ καταισχυνθείην, ὅτι ἐπεκαλεσάμην σε· αἰσχυνθείησαν οἱ ἀσεβεῖς καὶ καταχθείησαν εἰς ᾅδου.
18	תֵּ֥אָלַ֗מְנָה שִׂפְתֵ֫י־שָׁ֥קֶר הַדֹּבְר֖וֹת עַל־צַדִּ֥יק עָתָ֗ק בְּגַאֲוָ֥ה וָבֽוּז׃	Let the lying lips be put to silence; which speak grievous things proudly and contemptuously against the righteous.	ἄλαλα γενηθήτω τὰ χείλη τὰ δόλια τὰ λαλοῦντα κατὰ τοῦ δικαίου ἀνομίαν ἐν ὑπερηφανίᾳ καὶ ἐξουδενώσει.
19	מָ֤ה רַֽב־טוּבְךָ֮ אֲשֶׁר־צָפַ֢נְתָּ לִּירֵ֫אֶ֥יךָ פָּ֭עַלְתָּ לַחֹסִ֣ים בָּ֑ךְ נֶ֝֗גֶד בְּנֵ֣י אָדָֽם׃	Oh how great is thy goodness, which thou hast laid up for them that fear thee; which thou hast wrought for them that trust in thee before the sons of men!	ὡς πολὺ τὸ πλῆθος τῆς χρηστότητός σου, Κύριε, ἧς ἔκρυψας τοῖς φοβουμένοις σε, ἐξειργάσω τοῖς ἐλπίζουσιν ἐπὶ σὲ ἐναντίον τῶν υἱῶν τῶν ἀνθρώπων.
20	תַּסְתִּירֵ֤ם ׀ בְּסֵ֥תֶר פָּנֶיךָ֮ מֵרֻכְסֵ֫י־אִ֥ישׁ תִּצְפְּנֵ֥ם בְּסֻכָּ֗ה מֵרִ֥יב לְשֹׁנֽוֹת׃	Thou shalt hide them in the secret of thy presence from the pride of man: thou shalt keep them secretly in a pavilion from the strife of tongues.	κατακρύψεις αὐτοὺς ἐν ἀποκρύφῳ τοῦ προσώπου σου ἀπὸ ταραχῆς ἀνθρώπων, σκεπάσεις αὐτοὺς ἐν σκηνῇ ἀπὸ ἀντιλογίας γλωσσῶν.
21	בָּר֥וּךְ יְהֹוָ֑ה כִּ֥י הִפְלִ֘יא חַסְדּ֥וֹ לִ֝֗י בְּעִ֣יר מָצֽוֹר׃	Blessed be the LORD: for he hath shewed me his marvellous kindness in a strong city.	εὐλογητὸς Κύριος, ὅτι ἐθαυμάστωσε τὸ ἔλεος αὐτοῦ ἐν πόλει περιοχῆς.
22	וַאֲנִ֤י ׀ אָ֘מַ֤רְתִּי בְחׇפְזִ֗י נִגְרַזְתִּי֮ מִנֶּ֢גֶד עֵ֫ינֶ֥יךָ אָכֵ֗ן שָׁ֭מַעְתָּ ק֥וֹל תַּחֲנוּנַ֗י בְּשַׁוְּעִ֥י אֵלֶֽיךָ׃	For I said in my haste, I am cut off from before thine eyes: nevertheless thou heardest the voice of my supplications when I cried unto thee.	ἐγὼ δὲ εἶπα ἐν τῇ ἐκστάσει μου· ἀπέῤῥιμμαι ἀπὸ προσώπου τῶν ὀφθαλμῶν σου. διὰ τοῦτο εἰσήκουσας τῆς φωνῆς τῆς δεήσεώς μου ἐν τῷ κεκραγέναι με πρὸς σέ.
23	אֶ֥הֱב֥וּ אֶֽת־יְהֹוָ֗ה כׇּֽל־חֲסִ֫ידָ֥יו אֱ֭מוּנִים נֹצֵ֣ר יְהֹוָ֑ה וּמְשַׁלֵּ֥ם עַל־יֶ֝֗תֶר עֹשֵׂ֥ה גַאֲוָֽה׃	O love the LORD, all ye his saints: for the LORD preserveth the faithful, and plentifully rewardeth the proud doer.	ἀγαπήσατε τὸν Κύριον πάντες οἱ ὅσιοι αὐτοῦ, ὅτι ἀληθείας ἐκζητεῖ Κύριος καὶ ἀνταποδίδωσι τοῖς περισσῶς ποιοῦσιν ὑπερηφανίαν.
24	חִ֭זְקוּ וְיַאֲמֵ֣ץ לְבַבְכֶ֑ם כׇּל־הַ֝מְיַחֲלִ֗ים לַֽיהֹוָֽה׃	Be of good courage, and he shall strengthen your heart, all ye that hope in the LORD.	ἀνδρίζεσθε, καὶ κραταιούσθω ἡ καρδία ὑμῶν, πάντες οἱ ἐλπίζοντες ἐπὶ Κύριον.

== Notes and references ==
=== Sources ===
- Charles Augustus Briggs; Emilie Grace Briggs (1960) [1906]. A Critical and Exegetical Commentary on the Book of Psalms. International Critical Commentary. Vol. 1. Edinburgh: T & T Clark.
- Library of Congress (1967). Catalog of Copyright Entries: Third Series / Music: July–December 1964. U.S. Government Printing Office.
- Library of Congress (1975). Catalog of Copyright Entries: Third Series / Music: July–December 1973. U.S. Government Printing Office.
- Goldberg, David J.; Rayner, John D. (2012). The Jewish People: Their History and Their Religion. Faber & Faber. ISBN 9780571288359.
- Mazor, Lea (2011). "Book of Psalms". In Berlin, Adele; Grossman, Maxine (eds.). The Oxford Dictionary of the Jewish Religion. Oxford University Press. ISBN 978-0-19-973004-9.
- Scherman, Rabbi Nosson (2003). The Complete Artscroll Siddur (3rd ed.). Mesorah Publications, Ltd. ISBN 9780899066509.
- Wengert, Timothy J. (2019). Word of Life: Introducing Lutheran Hermeneutics. Fortress Press. ISBN 9781506402833.
