= Kate Clark (flautist) =

Australian flautist based in Amsterdam

Kate Clark is a solo, chamber, and orchestral flutist based in Amsterdam, The Netherlands. She is a specialist in the performance and performance practice of historical flutes from the renaissance to the early modern period, and teacher of historical flutes at the Royal Conservatory of The Hague.

== Musical career ==
Clark received a bachelor of music on modern and baroque flutes from the University of Sydney in 1985. She then studied baroque and classical flutes with Barthold Kuijken at the Royal Conservatory of The Hague, receiving a soloist's diploma cum laude. She undertook a final period of study and research at the Schola Cantorum Basiliensis in Basel, Switzerland, under the guidance of flutist and musicologist Anne Smith. In 1993, Clark won first prize in the international MAfestival Brugge Competition (Bruges International Early Music Competition).

Since 1988 Clark has performed and recorded throughout the world as a soloist with chamber ensembles and orchestras, including the Apollo Ensemble, the Attaignant Consort, Cantus Cölln (Konrad Junghänel), the FestspielOrchester Göttingen (of the Göttingen International Handel Festival), Les Musiciens du Louvre (Mark Minkowski), Musica Amphion, and Osmosis. She is the principal flute of the Amsterdam Baroque Orchestra (Ton Koopman) and a guest principal with the Orchestra of the Eighteenth Century, and she returns regularly to Australia as a guest of the Australian Brandenburg Orchestra, the Australian Chamber Orchestra, the Canberra Festival, and the Australian Romantic and Classical Orchestra. She is regularly singled out in reviews for her expressive playing.

Clark is co-founder and artistic director of the Attaignant Consort, a renaissance flute consort whose three-CD set (released on the Ramée label) documenting the solo and consort repertoire of the renaissance flute was crowned with a Diapason d'Or in 2013. She has been featured on the early music radio program Harmonia, and in the music magazines TIBIA and FLUIT, and she has written articles for various publications, including many CD liner notes. Additionally, she co-authored with Amanda Markwick The Renaissance Flute: A Contemporary Guide, a book on the performance practice and theory of the renaissance flute, published by Oxford University Press in 2020. For a presentation at the Rijksmuseum in Amsterdam in 2020, Clark played a copy of the Warder flute, an instrument that was discovered in 2018 in the wreckage of a ship that likely sank in the early sixteenth century, and now the oldest known Dutch flute.

Clark has been teaching principle-study historical flutists at the Royal Conservatory of The Hague since 1996. She has been on the jury for various competitions, including the Internationaler Telemann-Wettbewerb (2021).

== Selected discography ==
- 1989, Lindenberg: Psalms (Capella Amsterdam)
- 1993, Nuova Era: Jean-Marie Leclair: Deuxieme recreation de musique; Franrois Couperin: La Frangoise (La Quatrième Chambre)
- 1994, Globe Records: Philidor: Flute Suites (Wilbert Hazelzet / Kate Clark / Jacques Ogg / Titia de Zwart / Mike Fentross)
- 1995: Channel Classics: Machaut and His Time (Alba Musica Kyo)
- 1996, Globe Records: Bach Trio Sonatas for Flute and Violin (Wilbert Hazelzet / Kate Clark / Alda Stuurop / Jacques Ogg / Richte Van Der Meer)
- 2004, Brilliant Classics: Telemann: Tafelmusik (Complete) (Musica Amphion)
- 2007, ABC Classics: The Concert Spiritual: Anet, Guillemain, Mouret, Buffardin (Ensemble Battistin)
- 2009, ABC Classics: The Musicians' Table: Philidor, Boismortier, Guillemain, Rebel (Ensemble Battistin)
- 2011, Brilliant Classics: Telemann Edition (Musica Amphion)
- 2011, Centaur Records: JS Bach: Brandenburg Concertos (Apollo Ensemble)
- 2011, deutsche harmonia mundi: Cantus Cölln Edition (Cantus Cölln)
- 2012, Ramée: Ludwig Spohr – George Onslow: Nonets (Osmosis)
- 2012, Ramée: Madame d'amours (The Attaignant Consort / Kate Clark)
- 2012, Ramée: Au joly bois (Kate Clark / Nigel North / Freek Borstlap)
- 2012, Ramée: Le Parler et le Silence (The Attaignant Consort / Kate Clark)
- 2013, ABC Classics: The Perfection of Music: Masterpieces of the French Baroque (Ensemble Battistin)
- 2013, Centaur Records: Georg Philipp Telemann: Chamber Music (Apollo Ensemble)

== Legal career ==
Kate Clark obtained law degrees from the University of London and the University of Amsterdam, and is a Research Fellow at the Amsterdam Centre for War Reparations and Head of Research at the Nuhanovic Foundation. She has published reports on war reparations through the Nuhanovic Foundation, and articles in legal journals, such as the Journal of International Criminal Justice. She also co-authored a chapter in the book Narratives of Justice In and Out of the Courtroom.
