= Emiko Iiyama =

Japanese soprano

Emiko Iiyama (Japanese: 飯山恵巳子, born 16 April 1934 in Tokyo)is a Japanese soprano.

She was in 1968 a singer in Nikolaus Harnoncourt's recording of Bach's Mass in B minor, pioneering historically informed performances in 1968, singing the second soprano part. She recorded Bach cantatas for solo soprano, conducted by Fritz Werner, including Jauchzet Gott in allen Landen, BWV 51, with Maurice André performing the solo trumpet part. She performed contemporary music in a concert in honour of prize winners of an Austrian composition competition. Conducted by one of them, Erich Urbanner, she sang with bravura ("mit Bravour") Bojidar Dimov's Incantationes I, Kurt Schwertsik's Liebesträume, and Sommerpoesie – Winterpoesie by Günter Kahowez.
