= Rotraud Hansmann =

Austrian soprano in opera and concert (born 1940)

- Born: 1 March 1940 (age 85); Graz
- Education: Graz Conservatory
- Occupation: Operatic soprano
- Organizations: Deutsche Oper am Rhein; University of Music and Performing Arts, Vienna

Rotraud Hansmann (born 1 March 1940) is an Austrian soprano in opera and concert. She was a singer in the recordings by Nikolaus Harnoncourt which began historically informed performances, such as Monteverdi's operas and works by Johann Sebastian Bach. She was a teacher at the University of Music and Performing Arts, Vienna.

== Career ==
Born in Graz, Hansmann studied voice at the Graz Conservatory, also the piano, violin and guitar. She studied further in Amsterdam with Paula Salomon-Lindberg. She made her debut in 1958 at the Graz Opera as the 2nd Boy in Mozart's Die Zauberflöte. In 1964 she joined the Deutsche Oper am Rhein.

Hansmann recorded Monteverdi's Vespro della Beata Vergine with the Monteverdi-Chor, conducted by Jürgen Jürgens. She also recorded Bach cantatas, sacred music by Mozart and Mendelssohn's Lobgesang. She appeared as one of the Flower Maidens in Georg Solti's 1972 recording of Parsifal, with René Kollo in the title role.

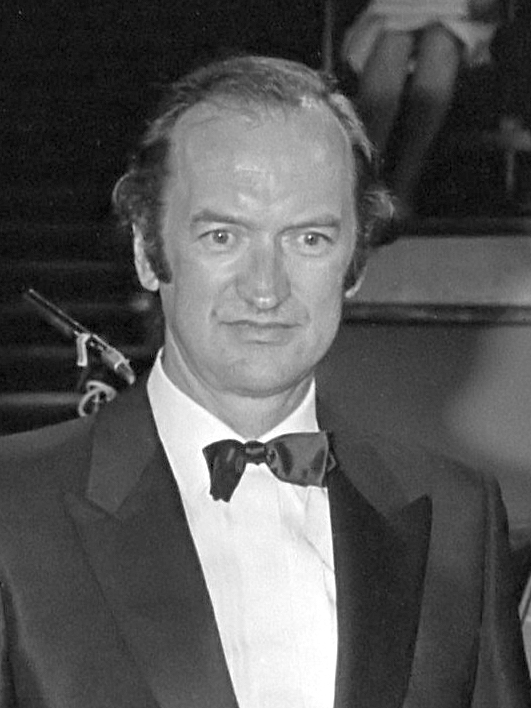
Nikolaus Harnoncourt, who conducted pioneering recordings of Monteverdi's operas and Bach's Mass in B minor

Hansmann was a singer in recordings by Nikolaus Harnoncourt, pioneering historically informed performances. She appeared in Monteverdi's operas, as La Musica and Euridice in L'Orfeo, alongside Lajos Kozma as Orfeo. A reviewer noted: "Rotraud Hansmann as Euridice sings beautifully with crisp diction and much attention to inflection." She performed the parts of Amore and Minerva in Il ritorno d'Ulisse in patria, with Sven-Olof Eliasson in the title role, and as Virtù and Drusilla in L'incoronazione di Poppea, alongside Helen Donath as Poppea, Elisabeth Söderström as Nerone, Cathy Berberian as Ottavia and Paul Esswood as Ottone. In 1968 Hansmann recorded the first soprano part of Bach's Mass in B minor.

Hansmann was a professor of voice at the University of Music and Performing Arts, Vienna, teaching singers such as Theresa Grabner, Yasushi Hirano and Jan Petryka.
