= Mechthild Bach =

German opera singer

- Born: 1963 (age 62–63); Limburg an der Lahn
- Occupations: Soprano; Academic
- Awards: Preis der deutschen Schallplattenkritik

Mechthild Bach is a German soprano and a professor at the Hochschule für Musik Trossingen.

== Biography and career ==
Bach was born in Limburg an der Lahn, where she was a member of the Limburg Cathedral's girl choir from a very young age. After her Abitur, she began her studies at the Hochschule für Musik und Darstellende Kunst Frankfurt am Main, under Elsa Cavelti's tutelage. During her time there she also made her operatic debut at the Staatstheater Darmstadt.

Since then, Bach has performed in such opera houses such as the Deutsche Oper am Rhein, the Nationaltheater München, and the Theater der Stadt Heidelberg, with conductors Reinhard Goebel, Peter Neumann, Ton Koopman, and Helmuth Rilling, among others. Additionally, she has performed the soprano parts in Mahler's symphonies, as Antigona in Handel's Admeto, and as Alice Ford in Verdi's Falstaff. She has also performed with the Internationale Bachakademie Stuttgart, the Royal Concertgebouw Orchestra, and the Berlin Philharmonic. Bach is a professor at the Hochschule für Musik Trossingen.

== Awards ==
- 1986: A grant from the Studienstiftung des Deutschen Volkes
- 1993: Innsbrucker Radiopreis für Alte Musik, for her album Thomaskantoren vor Bach with Cantus Cölln
- 2002: Preis der deutschen Schallplattenkritik, for her recording of Zelenka's Missa Dei Patris, with Frieder Bernius
