= Weilburger Schlosskonzerte =

Coordinates: 50.4855°N 8.2612°E

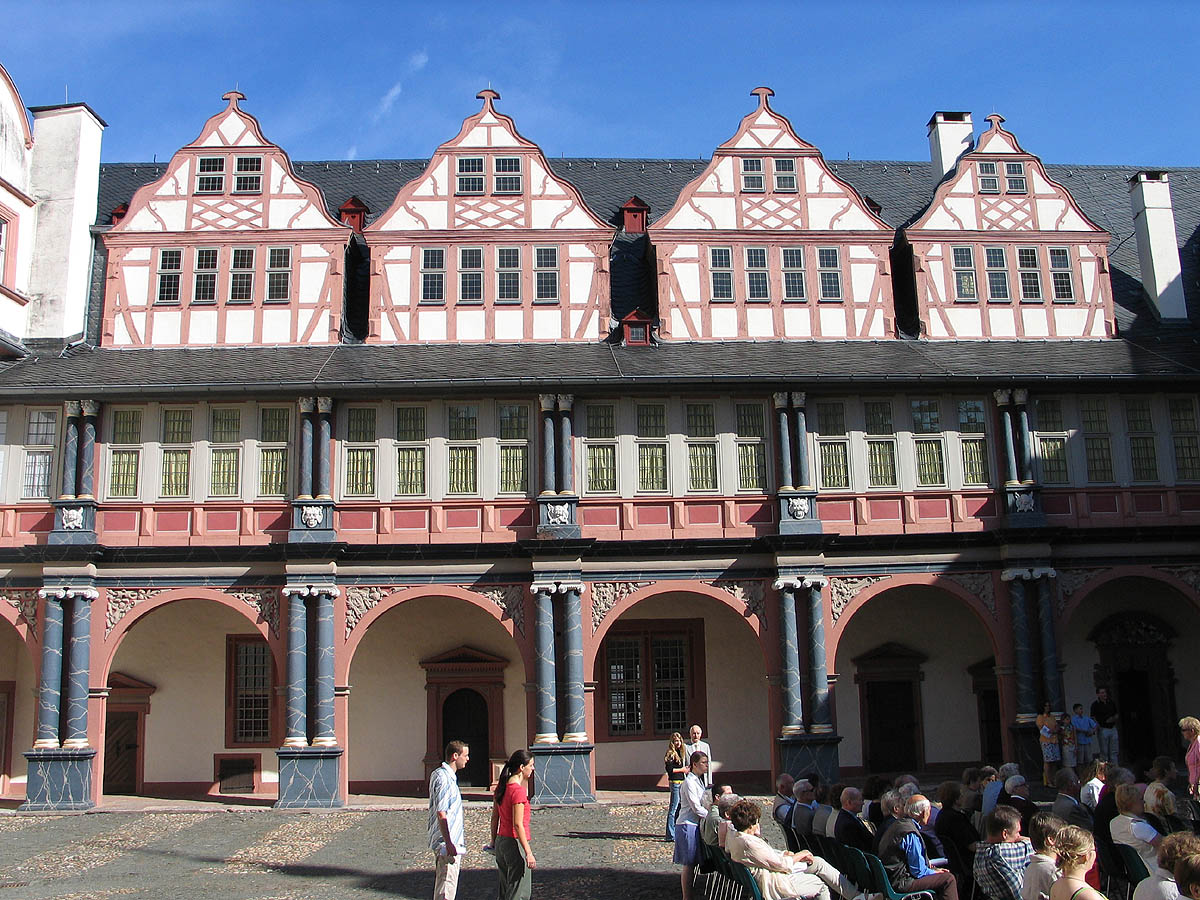
The Renaissancehof of the schloss ready for a concert, in 2005

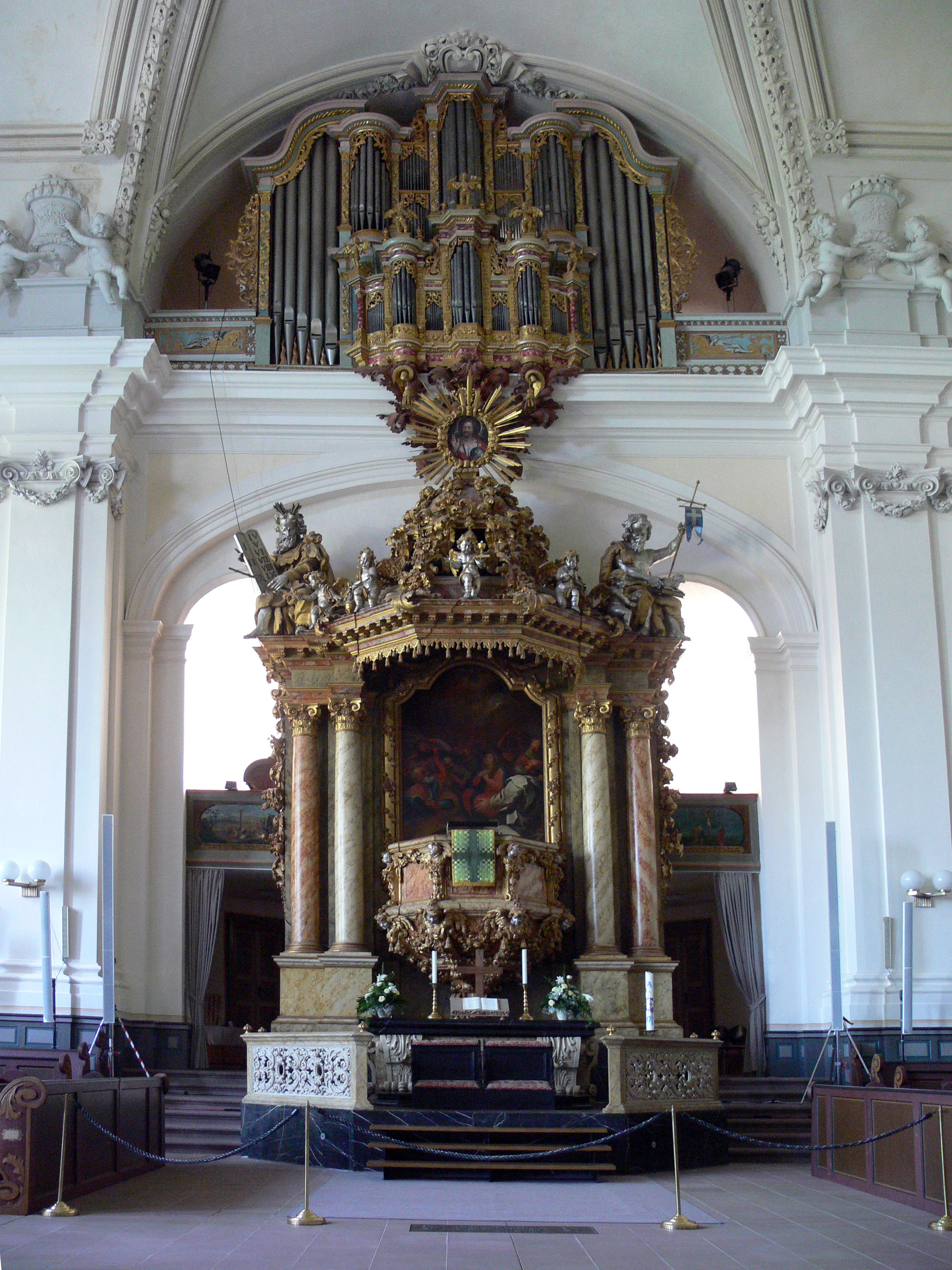
Interior of the Schlosskirche

Weilburger Schlosskonzerte (Weilburg schloss concerts) is the name of an annual summer music festival held in and around Schloss Weilburg in Weilburg, Hesse, Germany. The festival of regional importance was founded in 1972 and presents around 40 concerts of classical music in June and July. They are held open air in the Renaissancehof (Renaissance court), in the adjacent church Schlosskirche, the upper and lower Orangerie and in the Alte Hofstube, a historic room in the schloss.

Hans Koppenburg (1932–2013). a conductor from Frankfurt, was artistic director from 1972 to 1978, succeeded by Karl Rarich in 1980. The present director is Stephan Schreckenberger, who has shaped the program from 2011. The festival collaborates with Hessischer Rundfunk (hr), the public broadcaster of Hesse. Some of the concerts are aired throughout Europe. The hr-Sinfonieorchester and the hr-Bigband perform regularly at the festival.
