= Alyce Rogers =

American opera singer

Alyce Rogers is an American mezzo-soprano and alto opera singer. She began her career as an actor on the East Coast, but later found her passion in opera and light opera. After moving to Portland, Oregon, she appeared with the Oregon Symphony, the Israel Philharmonic Orchestra, and the Seattle Symphony Orchestra, among others. Rogers is well known for her interpretations of the mezzo and contralto riles in the operas of Gilbert and Sullivan, and Menotti.
