= Greg Funfgeld =

American conductor

Greg Funfgeld (born May 29, 1953, on Long Island, New York) is an American conductor, especially a choral conductor. He has been the artistic director and conductor of The Bach Choir of Bethlehem from 1983, appearing internationally. He has recorded several works by Bach including the Mass in B minor in 1997.
