= Koki Katano =

Japanese tenor (born 1968)

Koki Katano (born 1968) is a Japanese tenor. He began singing at the age of seven and later studied for a Master's at the Tokyo National University of Fine Arts and Music. He joined the Bach Collegium Japan in 1992, and then studied at the Hamburg Conservatory and the Bremen University of Fine Arts in Germany. He has since resided in Germany, where he has gained attention for his cantatas of J.S. Bach's cantatas, such as Christ lag in Todes Banden, BWV 4, St. John Passion (BWV 245) and Christmas Oratorio (BWV 248) and Handel's Messiah. Katano has also appeared as a guest singer with the NDR Chor.
