= Elisabeth Hermans =

Belgian soprano

Elisabeth Hermans is a Belgian soprano. A graduate of Lemmensinstituut in Leuven and the Antwerp Conservatory, she began performing with ensembles such as Collegium Vocale Gent, La Chapelle Royale, La Petite Bande, the Huelgas Ensemble, and the Netherlands Bach Society, but in more recent years has gained acclaim as a soloist especially singing the cantatas of J.S. Bach.
