= Akira Tachikawa =

Akira Tachikawa (Japanese: 太刀川 昭, Tachikawa Akira, 1961ｰ) is a Japanese countertenor, described as "one of a very few accomplished Japanese counter-tenors".

A 1980 graduate of the Tokyo National University of Fine Arts and Music, in which he studied under Kounosuke Watanabe and Ryousuke Hatanaka, he has since obtained work as a singer, particularly in Baroque music in Europe, where he moved in 1986. He has performed with the Bach Collegium Japan under their conductor Masaaki Suzuki.

== Discography ==
In 1995 he was a soloist in the first volume of Bach Collegium Japan's recording of the complete Bach cantatas on BIS Records. After these performances of the early cantatas BWV 4 and BWV 150 he went on to record other cantatas and the Magnificat BWV 243.

Contemporary music:

- A.Danilevski. 'Koans. Fragment of Consciousness'. 2016, Centaur, USA, CRS 348 (ensemble Syntagma)
- A.Danilevski. 'The Uncertainty Principle", 2012, Carpe Diem, D (ensemble Syntagma)

Early Music

- Songé .i.songe. J. de Lescurel. Chansons et Dit enté. 2014, Facsimile Rec., (ensemble Syntagma)
- Rosa et Orticha. 2012, Carpe Diem, D. (ensemble Syntagma)
- Stylems. Italian music from XIVth c., 2012, Challenge Classics, NL (ensemble Syntagma)
- Gautier d'Epinal. Remembrance. 2008, Challenge Classics, NL (ensemble Syntagma)
- Touz esforciez. Trouvères en Lorraine. 2004, Pierre Verany, F (ensemble Syntagma)
