= Elisabeth Popien =

German alto singer

Elisabeth Popien is a German alto singer.

A graduate in Protestant church music at the Musikhochschule Köln in 1992, she mainly performs works predating 1800, particularly the Bach cantatas such as Christ lag in Todes Banden, BWV 4, Weinen, Klagen, Sorgen, Zagen, BWV 12 and Actus tragicus, also recitals of Lieder. A member of the vocal ensemble Cantus Cölln, she has worked with Evelyn Tubb, Anthony Rooley, Sigiswald Kuijken, Hermann Max and Jordi Savall.
