= Bach Choir of Bethlehem =

US choir

The Bach Choir of Bethlehem
- Choir
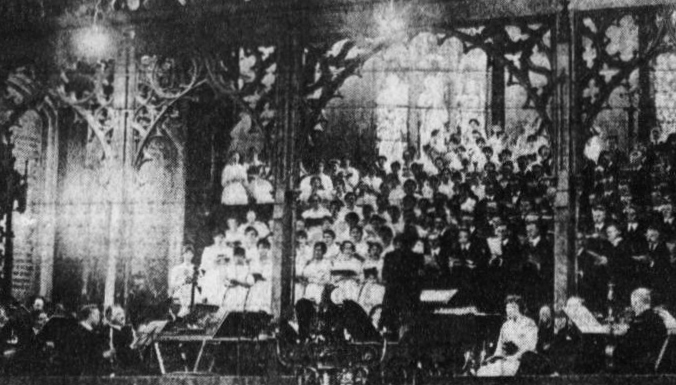
- The choir at the Bethlehem Bach Festival, Bethlehem, Pennsylvania, 1917
- Origin: First organized to study Bach's Mass in B Minor
- Founded: 1898
- Founder: John Frederick Wolle, an organist at Central Moravian Church, Bethlehem, Pennsylvania
- Genre: Baroque and classical music
- President: Harold G. Black
- Music director: Dr. Christopher Jackson
- Choir admission: By audition
- Headquarters: 440 Heckewelder Place; Bethlehem, Pennsylvania, U.S., 18018 (610) 866-4382
- Influences: Johann Sebastian Bach and the composers who influenced him and were influenced by him

The Bach Choir of Bethlehem is the oldest Bach choir in the United States. Dating back to 1712, according to the choir's archives, it was formally founded in 1898 by Central Moravian Church organist John Frederick Wolle, and was established at roughly the same time as Bethlehem Steel, which first began operations in 1899.

Based in Bethlehem, Pennsylvania, the choir has toured internationally, performing at the Royal Albert Hall, the Thomaskirche in Leipzig (where Johann Sebastian Bach was a cantor), and the Herkulessaal in the Munich Residenz (Munich's Royal Residence). It has also performed at such American venues as Carnegie Hall and The Kennedy Center, has recorded with the BBC Proms and on the Dorian and Analekta labels, and hosts the world's longest-running Bach festival.

== History ==
Founded in 1898 by Central Moravian Church organist John Frederick Wolle, the Bach Choir of Bethlehem brought musicians together from the Bethlehem, Pennsylvania area to study the Mass in B Minor written by Johann Sebastian Bach. This choir is credited with having given the American premiere of Bach's complete Mass on March 27, 1900 (although there is evidence that parts of the Mass had been performed in the United States as early as 1870). Following that premiere performance, the choir then also delivered the first complete performance in America of Bach's Christmas Oratorio in 1901.

In 1914, the Bach Choir's conductor, J. Frederick Wolle, was described by the Harrisburg Telegraph as "the foremost present-day student of Bach" in its coverage of the ensemble's performance at Bethlehem's ninth Bach festival.

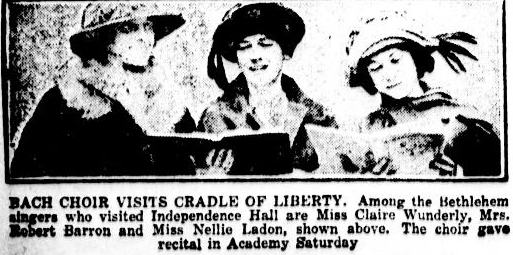
Members of the Bach Choir of Bethlehem photographed prior to their November 1922 performance at the Philadelphia Academy of Music

In 1921, Philadelphia's Evening Public Ledger described the ensemble as a "famous organization," and noted that its members would perform at that city's Academy of Music on November 6.

Bruce Carey and William Ifor Jones conducted the ensemble from 1933-1938 and 1939-1969, respectively. Alfred Mann, noted German-American musicologist, assumed leadership of the choir in 1970. Greg Funfgeld, a 1976 graduate of Westminster Choir College, was the conductor from 1983 - 2021. Under his leadership, the choir expanded its concertizing from annual performances at the Bethlehem Bach Festival to a year-round series of 31 concerts, released numerous recordings, and has been involved with the production of two films (the PBS documentary, Make a Joyful Noise, and the internationally distributed Classical Kids’ DVD, Mr. Bach Comes to Call. Funfgeld also initiated and expanded the choir's educational outreach initiatives, including Bach to School and Bach at Noon, which were awarded National Endowment for the Arts grants from 2011 to 2017 and a 2012 international award from the J. S. Bach-Stiftung foundation in Switzerland.

In 2007, The Bethlehem and Baldwin Wallace University (BW Bach Festival), the oldest collegiate Bach festival in the nation as well as the second-oldest Bach festival in the nation), performed together for BW's 75th anniversary of the festival. These two groups have worked together to celebrate the milestones of their festivals. Riemenschneider, founder of the BW festival, was inspired by a 1931 trip to the Bethlehem Bach Festival.

In May 2019, the choir announced that both its artistic and executive directors would retire within two years. The COVID-19 pandemic delayed their plans, leading Bridget George to retire as Executive Director in June 2021, to be succeeded by Leela Breithaupt. Greg Funfgeld stayed on as Artistic Director and Conductor for one more year, retiring in June 2022 after 39 years of service. Dr. Christopher Jackson was announced as the Choir's seventh Artistic Director and Conductor on May 26, 2022.

== Selected discography ==
- Johann Sebastian Bach : Christmas in Leipzig. CD Dorian DOR-90113 1988
- Johann Sebastian Bach : Wachet auf!. CD, Album Dorian DOR-90127 1989
- Christmas in Bethlehem. CD, Album Helffrich Recording Labs 1994
- Johann Sebastian Bach : Mass in B Minor. 2xCD, Album Dorian DOR-90253 1998
- Johann Sebastian Bach : Christmas Oratorio. 2xCD Dorian 1999
- Johann Sebastian Bach : The Ascension Oratorio and Two Festive Cantatas, CD Dorian 2002
- Christmas in Bethlehem, Vol. 4, CD, Album 2006
- Johann Sebastian Bach, Antonio Vivaldi : Magnificat/Cantata 191/Gloria. CD Analekta AN 2 9872 2009
- Johann Sebastian Bach : Saint John Passion. 2xCD, Album Analekta AN2 9890-1 2012
- A Child's Christmas in Bethlehem. CD Analekta 2013
- George Frideric Handel : Ode for St. Cecelia's Day. CD, Album Analekta AN 2 9541 2018
