= Monika Mauch =

German soprano

Monika Mauch (Geislingen an der Steige, Germany) is a German soprano.

Mauch specializes in early music. She studied singing with Richard Wistreich at the Institute for Early Music of the Trossingen University of Music where she obtained her diploma. She also studied with Jill Feldman in Paris and has been described as having a boyish agile voice.

== Selected discography ==
- Dowland A Musical Banquet with lutenist Nigel North. ECM
- Couperin, and others. Les Escapades du Roy – French baroque songs. Christophorus
- Handel. Neun deutsche Arien (Nine German Arias). With L'arpa festante/Rien Voskuilen. Carus
