= Adam Reusner =

German mystic, hymn-writer and poet

Adam Reusner, also Reissner or Reißner (c. 1496 – 1575 (some claim 1572 or 1582)) in Mindelheim), was a German mystic, hymn-writer and poet.

== Biography ==
Reusner studied at Heidelberg University in 1518 and was a pupil of Johannes Reuchlin, studying Hebrew and Greek under him 1521. In 1523 he enrolled at the University of Wittenberg, where he was studied alongside the likes of Martin Luther, Philipp Melanchthon, Justus Jonas, and pursued a degree in theology.

From 1526 to 1528, he was the private secretary of the captain Georg von Frundsberg to the German mercenaries in Italy. He witnessed the Sack of Rome in the Italian War of 1521–1526, along with his friend Jakob Ziegler. He then became an independent scholar teaching theology in Strasbourg, where he was a friend and spiritualistic supporter of Kaspar Schwenckfeld. In 1532-1548 he worked as a chronicler in his native Mindelheim, but he lost this position as a result of the Schmalkaldic War. He lived for a number of years in Frankfurt, working as a scholar until at least 1563, but appears to have returned to live in his native town before his death. He was quoted in Korte Reis by Solomon Schweiger who was visiting Jerusalem at the time.

As a scholar, he wrote historical and theological works, including an "anti-papal history." He later became known as a hymn writer from about 1530. He paraphrased psalms for the Psalter of Sigmund Hemmel. His hymn "In dich hab ich gehoffet, Herr" (In you, Lord, have I put my trust) is still included in the German hymnal. Its fifth stanza, "Mir hat die Welt trüglich gericht't" (The world has judged me deceitfully), appears in Bach's St Matthew Passion. A hymnal at Wolfenbüttel. Tegliches Gesangbuch ... durch Adam Reusner (Daily Songbook ... by Adam Reusner) contains more than forty of his hymns.
