= Yumiko Kurisu =

Japanese classical singer (1961- )

- Born: January 1, 1961; Japan
- Other name: 来栖由美子
- Occupation: Classic music singer (soprano)
- Organizations: Bach Collegium Japan

Yumiko Kurisu is a Japanese classical soprano, a musicologist and an academic teacher. She has recorded cantatas by Johann Sebastian Bach with the Bach Collegium Japan, both as a soloist as a member of the ensemble.

== Biography ==
Kurisu studied at the Tokyo National University of Fine Arts and Music, graduating in 1984. She specialises in the vocal techniques and performance style the 17th and 18th centuries.

She has taught at the Oita University, from 1998 as Assistant Professor at the Faculty of Education, from 2001 as Associated Professor of Music.

== Publications ==
- "A Study of 18th century vocal techniques" (1994)
- "Techniques of Agilita". Bulletin of Tokyo National University of Fine Arts and Music (1994)
