= Johanna Koslowsky =

German singer

Johanna Koslowsky is a German soprano and vocal coach in the field of historically informed performance.

Koslowsky began her vocal training with Hilde Wesselmann in Essen. After graduation, she studied church music at the Hochschule für Musik Köln. She continued her studies with Bornemann in Hannover, Michaela Krämer in Düsseldorf and René Jacobs in Basel.

She specializes in music before 1800 and is a permanent member of the vocal ensemble Cantus Cölln. She is married to Konrad Junghänel, the conductor. The group appeared together with the ensemble Akademie für Alte Musik Berlin, Musica Alta Ripa, Musica Antiqua Köln, Musica Fiata and Sequentia. Their interpretations have been aired by numerous domestic and foreign radio stations, and they have made numerous recordings. Besides her work as a soloist, she is also active as a voice teacher.
