= Wilfried Jochens =

German tenor

Wilfried Jochens is a German tenor. A graduate of Hamburg University and the State College for Music and Fine Arts, studying under Johannes Hoefflin, he has been a concert vocalist since 1972. He is particularly noted for his performances as the Evangelist in Bach's Passions. He has performed many of the Bach cantatas, and the principal oratorios of George Frideric Handel, Monteverdi, Haydn, Mozart and Felix Mendelssohn. He is a member of the vocale ensemble Cantus Cölln. Since 1982 he has taught voice at the Hamburg College of Music. Among his pupils has been Knut Schoch.
