= Gerd Türk =

German classical tenor

- Education: Schola Cantorum Basiliensis
- Occupations: Classical tenor; Academic teacher
- Organizations: Cantus Cölln; Schola Cantorum Basiliensis

Gerd Türk is a German classical tenor.

== Biography ==
Gerd Türk received his first musical training as a choir boy at the cathedral of Limburg. He studied in Frankfurt and then at the Schola Cantorum Basiliensis with Richard Levitt and René Jacobs, continuing in master classes with Ernst Haefliger and Kurt Equiluz.

In the field of historically informed performance he has worked with Frans Brüggen, Philippe Herreweghe and Jordi Savall. He was a founding member of the ensemble Cantus Cölln and has collaborated with the Ensemble Gilles Binchois under Dominique Vellard specialising in Medieval music. He has appeared as the Evangelist in the Passions of Johann Sebastian Bach, took part in the project of Ton Koopman to record Bach's complete vocal works with the Amsterdam Baroque Orchestra & Choir and also in the complete recording by the Bach Collegium Japan under Masaaki Suzuki.

Since 2000 he has been teaching at the Schola Cantorum Basiliensis and master classes at the University of Fine Arts in Tokyo.
