= Stephan Schreckenberger =

- Born: 16 February 1955 (age 71)
- Occupations: Bass; Conductor; Academic teacher; Festival director
- Organizations: Musica Lingua; Hochschule für Musik und Darstellende Kunst Frankfurt; Weilburger Schlosskonzerte

Stephan Schreckenberger (born 16 February 1955) is a German bass singer and conductor, especially in the field of early music. From 2003, he has been a teacher at the Hochschule für Musik und Darstellende Kunst Frankfurt, and from 2011 the director of the festival Weilburger Schlosskonzerte.

== Career ==
Schreckenberger first studied music education at the Musikhochschule Frankfurt, then voice with Annemarie Grünewald in Heidelberg and Ernst Gerold Schramm in Berlin. He finished his training with Karl-Heinz Jarius in Frankfurt.

From the late 1980s, Schreckenberger was a member of the vocal ensemble Cantus Cölln. He has worked internationally, primarily in the field of early music. He participated in around 60 recordings. He has collaborated often with conductors such as Hermann Max, Jordi Savall and Michael Schneider. He recorded Bach cantatas with Konrad Junghänel, Sigiswald Kuijken and Masaaki Suzuki.

In 1999, Schreckenberger founded the vocal ensemble Musica Lingua and released several CDs on the Leipzig classical music label GENUIN .

Since 2003 he has taught singers and vocal ensembles at the department of historically informed performance of the Musikhochschule Frankfurt. In 2011, he was appointed director of the summer music festival Weilburger Schlosskonzerte, succeeding Karl Rarichs, who was the artistic director for 30 years.
