= Konrad Junghänel =

German lutenist and conductor

- Born: 27 February 1953 (age 72)
- Education: Hochschule für Musik und Tanz Köln
- Occupations: Lutenist; Conductor; Academic teacher
- Organizations: Cantus Cölln; Hochschule für Musik und Tanz Köln

Konrad Junghänel (born 27 February 1953) is a German lutenist and conductor in the field of historically informed performance, the founder and director of the vocal ensemble Cantus Cölln.

== Career ==
Junghänel studied at the Hochschule für Musik und Tanz Köln. He has given solo concerts internationally and has worked with ensembles such as Les Arts Florissants, La Petite Bande, Musica Antiqua Köln and Tafelmusik Baroque Orchestra. As a lutenist, he recorded works by Jacques Bittner in 1984. He is particularly known for his lute recitals of Johann Sebastian Bach and Sylvius Leopold Weiss, and received the Preis der Deutschen Schallplattenkritik for his solo recording of a piece by Weiss in 1985. He has collaborated with countertenor René Jacobs and gambist Wieland Kuijken, and has also played theorbo, such as a 13-course chitarrone and a 14 course liuto attiorbato, among others.

In 1987, Junghänel founded the vocal ensemble Cantus Cölln, which he has directed ever since. Numerous recordings of Cantus Cölln have received international recognition. They recorded, among others, Monteverdi's Vespro della Beata Vergine, Dieterich Buxtehude's Membra Jesu Nostri and Geistliche Kantaten (Sacred Cantatas), and Johann Rosenmüller's Vespers, Weihnachtshistorie (Christmas Story) and Sacri Concerti (Sacred Concerts). In 1989, they recorded Psalms, Motets and Concertos by Heinrich Schütz, with the Knabenchor Hannover and singers Johanna Koslowsky, María Cristina Kiehr, Heike Halaschka, David Cordier, Herbert Klein, Andreas Scholl, Wilfried Jochens, Gerd Türk, Frans-Josef Selig and Stephan Schreckenberger. In 2000, they recorded early Bach cantatas, Weinen, Klagen, Sorgen, Zagen, BWV 12, the Actus Tragicus, Der Herr denket an uns, BWV 196, and Christ lag in Todesbanden, BWV 4, with singers Koslowsky, Elisabeth Popien, Jochens, Türk and Schreckenberger. In 2002, they won the Gramophone Award in the category "Baroque Vocal" for the first complete recording of Monteverdi's Selva morale e spirituale, accompanied by the Concerto Palatino. Following the concept of Joshua Rifkin of one singer on a part, they recorded in 2003 Bach's Mass in B minor with ten singers, one on each part for the six-part and eight-part movements, but two on each part for most of the four-part and five-part movements. Junghänel has featured on over 100 recordings with Deutsche Harmonia Mundi, Harmonia Mundi France, EMI, Accent and Deutsche Grammophon/Archiv Produktion.

Junghänel became professor of the Hochschule für Musik Köln in 1994. He conducted opera at the Theater Basel, the Staatsoper Hamburg, Staatsoper Hannover and Staatsoper Stuttgart, Cologne Opera, Komische Oper Berlin, Deutsche Oper am Rhein and the Staatstheater Saarbrücken, among others, working with directors such as Herbert Wernicke, Nigel Lowery, Karin Beier and Calixto Bieito. Since the 2009/2010 season, Junghänel has collaborated with director Uwe Eric Laufenberg at the Cologne Opera. In 2012, he conducted Handel's opera Xerxes at the Komische Oper Berlin, directed by Stefan Herheim, with Stella Doufexis in the title role.
