= Bach Collegium Japan =

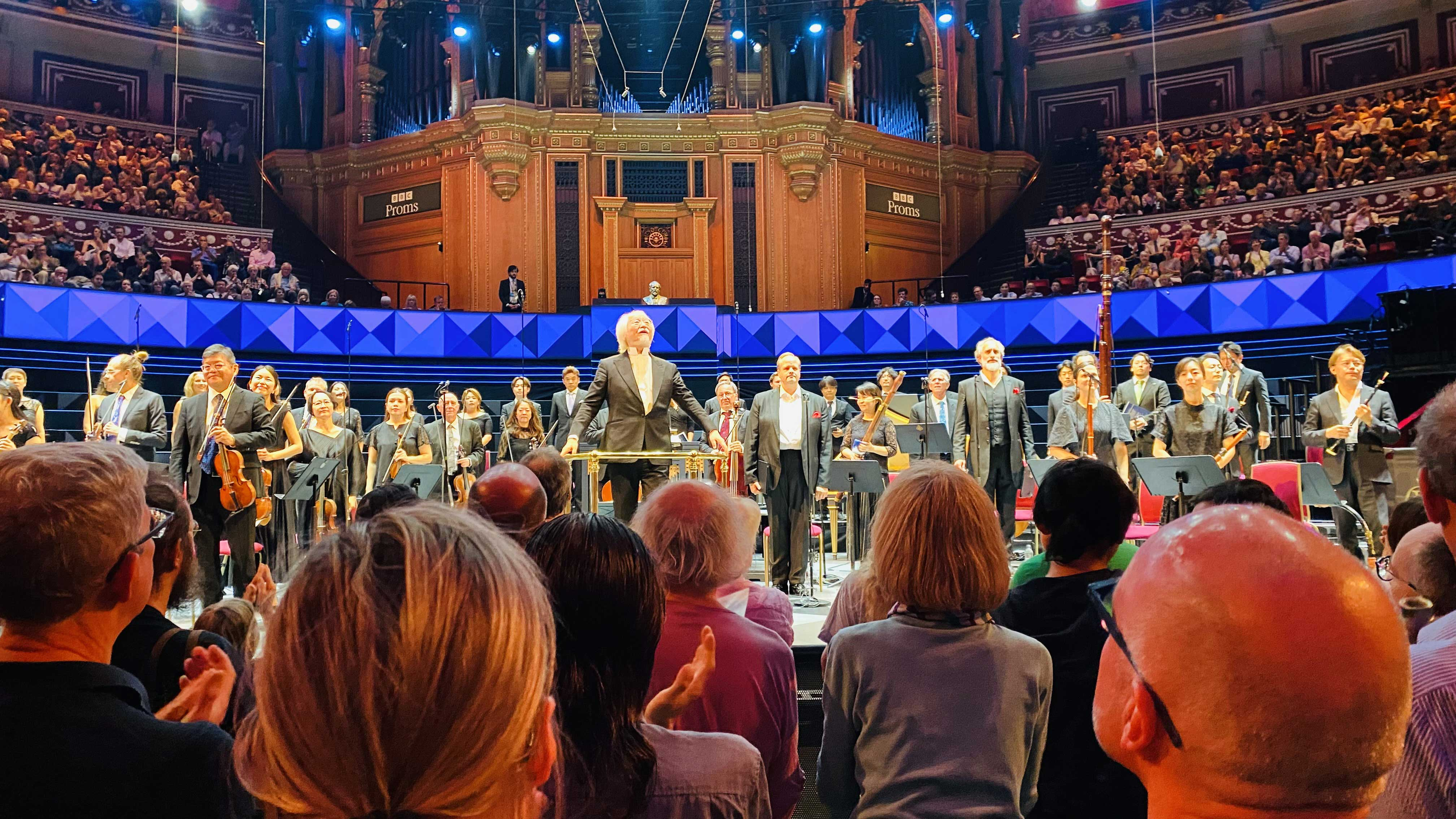
- Bach Collegium Japan with Masaaki Suzuki at the BBC Proms in 2024

Background information
- Also known as: BCJ
- Origin: Japan
- Years active: 1990-present
- Website: bachcollegiumjapan.org/en/

Bach Collegium Japan (BCJ) is composed of an orchestra and a chorus specializing in Baroque music, playing on period instruments. It was founded in 1990 by Masaaki Suzuki with the purpose of introducing Japanese audiences to European Baroque music; Suzuki is still the music director. The ensemble has recorded all of Bach’s cantatas, a project that extended from 1995 to 2018 and accounts for over half of its discography.

== History ==
The ensemble was founded in 1990 by Masaaki Suzuki who is still its music director Since then, they have become sought-after performers, collaborating with European artists such as Max van Egmond, Nancy Argenta, Christoph Prégardien, Peter Kooy, Hana Blažíková, Monika Frimmer, Michael Chance, Kai Wessel, Gerd Türk, Michael Schopper and Concerto Palatino.

They have toured Asia, Europe and North America, with many performances as cultural festivals such as Edinburgh Festival, the Hong Kong Arts Festival, the Festival Internacional Cervantino the Bach Festival in Leipzig, the Oregon Bach Festival, the Boston Early Music Festival and the BBC Proms.

Five years after the Collegium was founded, they began a project to record all the Bach cantatas, finishing in 2013. Working with Swedish record label BIS, the work was performed at a Christian chapel at Kobe University, one of the few Christian churches in the country large enough to properly perform such works. These recordings account for over half of the ensemble's 99-album discography.

== The ensemble ==
The Collegium is based in Tokyo and Kobe, with the aim of introducing Japanese audiences to Baroque music on period instruments. It consists of a Baroque orchestra and chorus with about twenty voices and about 25 instrumentalists at any given performance. Unlike most Japanese orchestras, it has some female section-leaders, and it draws on a hand-picked group of European instrumentalists. The vocal soloists are also a mix of Japanese and foreign, Suzuki's argument being that if the Collegium employed only Europeans, there would be little to distinguish it from other period ensembles.

== Masaaki Suzuki ==
Masaaki Suzuki (b. 1954) founded the collegium after being invited to inaugurate a hall in Osaka, bringing together two ensembles already under his direction. Suzuki is a pioneer of early-music performance in East Asia and an international Bach authority. He graduated Tokyo National University of Fine Arts and Music and later attended the Sweelinck Conservatory in Amsterdam, studying under Piet Kee and Ton Koopman.

== Artistry ==
The focus of the ensemble, for which they are noted, is the works of Bach and those Protestant German composers that influenced him such as Dietrich Buxtehude, Heinrich Schütz, Johann Hermann Schein and Georg Böhm. Best known for their performances of Bach's Cantatas, they have also performed his Passions, as well as Handel's Messiah and Monteverdi's Vespers. Most of these works are for a full chorus, but they also present smaller programs for soloists and small vocal groups.

Alex Ross identifies Suzuki's approach to Bach's music as falling between two extremes, that of large ensembles (now regarded as old-fashioned in this repertoire), and on the other hand that of purists with one voice per part. According to Ross, Suzuki's interpretations tend towards subtlety rather than flamboyance avoiding "abrupt accents, florid ornaments, and freewheeling tempos that are fashionable in Baroque performance practice". Ross praises Suzuki's clarity and musicality but suggests that at times the performances can seem to lack force. The BBC reviewed a 2013 release in the cantata series as "Fluently stylish and idiomatic, the performers live and breathe Bach's music with as much immediacy as if it had been composed yesterday".

== Members ==
Concertmaster (violin, viola and viola d'amore): Ryo Terakado

=== Sopranos ===
- Hana Blažíková
- Minae Fujisaki
- Yoshie Hida
- Tamiko Hoshi
- Mihoko Hoshikawa
- Naoco Kaketa
- Yumiko Kurisu
- Joanne Lunn
- Aki Matsui
- Dorothee Mields
- Sachiko Muratani
- Rachel Nicholls
- Yukari Nonoshita
- Carolyn Sampson
- Eri Sawae
- Mikiko Suzuki
- Aki Yanagisawa

=== Altos ===
- Hiroya Aoki
- Yuko Anazawa
- Pascal Bertin
- Robin Blaze
- Mutsumi Hatano
- Yoshikazu Mera
- Toshiharu Nakajima
- Claudia Schmitz
- Tamaki Suzuki
- Akira Tachikawa
- Chiharu Takahashi
- Yukie Tamura
- Sumihito Uesugi
- Matthew White
- Makiko Yamashita

=== Tenors ===
- Yusuke Fujii
- Hiroto Ishikawa
- Takayuki Kagami
- Koki Katano
- Jan Kobow
- Wolfram Lattke
- Satoshi Mizukoshi
- Katsuhiko Nakashima
- Takanori Onishi
- Makoto Sakurada
- Michio Shimada
- Jun Suzuki
- Yosuke Taniguchi
- Akira Takizawa
- Gerd Türk
- Andreas Weller

=== Basses ===
- Daisuke Fujii
- Jun Hagiwara
- Yoshiya Hida
- Toru Kaku
- Peter Kooy
- Tetsuya Odagawa
- Yoshitaka Ogasawara
- Tetsuya Oi
- Kazuhiko Ono
- Naoki Sasaki
- Chiyuki Urano
- Yusuke Watanabe
- Roderick Williams
- Dominik Wörner
- Seiji Yoshikawa.
