= Carlos Mena =

Countertenor opera singer

- Born: 1971 (age 54–55); Vitoria, Spain
- Education: Schola Cantorum Basiliensis
- Occupation: Opera singer (countertenor)
- Notable work: Radamisto (title role), L'Orfeo (Speranza), Il Trionfo del Tempo e del Disinganno (Disinganno), Europera 5
- Style: 20th-century classical
- Awards: Diapason d'Or (2002)

Carlos Mena (born 1971) is a Spanish countertenor opera singer. He has previously worked with groups such as Al Ayre Español, Ensemble Gilles Binchois, and Ricercar Consort and has an interest in the twentieth-century repertoire.

== Life and career ==
Carlos Mena initially worked as a countertenor in masterclasses with Charles Brett and then relocated to Switzerland in 1992 to study a Diploma of Reinaissance-Baroque Music at the Schola Cantorum Basiliensis in Basel. His teachers here were Richard Levitt and René Jacobs, and he was awarded the diploma in 1997.

His operatic performances have included Handel's Radamisto (title role), Monteverdi's L'Orfeo (Speranza), Handel's Il Trionfo del Tempo e del Disinganno (Disinganno), and John Cage's Europera 5.

His recital De Aeternitate (Ricercar Consort) won a Diapason d'Or in 2002.

== Discography ==
- El Cant de La Sibilla Mallorca - València (1400-1560). Montserrat Figueras, Jordi Savall, La Capella Reial de Catalunya Alia Vox 9806, 1999.
- Heinrich Ignaz Franz von Biber: Missa Bruxellensis. Letizia Scherrer, Regula Konrad, Pascal Bertin, Carlos Mena, Lambert Climent, Francesc Garrigosa, Daniele Carnovich & Yves Bergé, Jordi Savall, La Capella Reial de Catalunya, Le Concert des Nations. Alia Vox AV9808, 1999.
- Lágrimas corriendo Canciones con vihuela en la España del siglo XVI. Carlos Mena, Juan Rivera. Almaviva, 2001. Miguel de Fuenllana, Alonso Mudarra
- Alfons V El Magnanim 1396 - 1458 El Cancionero de Montecassino Chansons sacrées et profanes du XVe siècle. Montserrat Figueras, Jordi Savall, La Capella Reial de Catalunya Alia Vox 9816A + B, 2001.
- Vespro a voce sola. Carlos Mena, Ensemble La Fenice, Jean Tubéry. NAÏVE CLASSIQUE, 2002. Claudio Monteverdi, Chiara Margarita Cozzolani, Tarquinio Merula. Orazio Tarditi, Alessandro Grandi, Adriano Banchieri
- Henry Du Mont: Grands Motets. Carlos Mena, Arnaud Marzorati, Stephan MacLeod, Philippe Pierlot, Namur Chamber Choir, Ricercar Consort. Ricercar, 2003.
- Johann Sebastian Bach: De Occulta Philosophia. Carlos Mena, Emma Kirkby, José Miguel Moreno. Glossa Platinum, 2004.
- De Aeternitate: Cantatas. Carlos Mena, Philippe Pierlot, Ricercar Consort. Mirare, 2004. Johann Christoph Bach, Johann Michael Bach, Christoph Bernhard, Johann Caspar Ferdinand Fischer, Christian Geist, Nikolaus Hasse, Melchior Hoffmann, Johann Adam Reincken, Christian Spahn.
- Johann Sebastian Bach: Actus Tragicus. Carlos Mena, Katharine Fuge, Jan Kobow, Philippe Pierlot, Ricercar Consort. Mirare, 2005.
- La Cantada Española en América. Carlos Mena, Eduardo López Banzo, Al Ayre Español. Harmonia Mundi Ibérica, 2005. José de Nebra, José de Torres, Anónimo
- Enríquez de Valderrábano: Silva de sirenas. Carlos Mena, Armoniosi Concerti. Harmonia Mundi, 2005.
- Giovanni Battista Pergolesi: Stabat Mater. Carlos Mena, Nuria Rial, Philippe Pierlot, Ricercar Consort. Mirare, 2005.
- Antonio Vivaldi: Stabat Mater. Carlos Mena, François Fernandez, Marc Hantai, Philippe Pierlot, Ricercar Consort. Mirare, 2005.
- Basque songs: Paisajes del Recuerdo. Carmelo Bernaola (1929-2002): Tres canciones de Segovia. Aita Donostia: Baratza baten lor polit bat. Lullabies. Gabriel Erkoreka: Azules. Francisco Escudero: Tres cantos vascos. José María Franco: Diré tu nombre. Jesús Guridi: Paysage. Melodías para canto y piano. Francisco Ibáñez (composer) (b. 1951): Os miro antes de irme. Andrés Isasi: 6 songs. Beltrán Pagola (1878-1950): Zortzico. José Uruñuela (1891-1963): Lieder Basko. Emiliana de Zubeldía (1888-1987): Zortzico. Carlos Mena, Susana Garcia de Salazar (piano). Harmonia Mundi, 2007.
- Various composers - Francisco Javier - The Route to the Orient. Montserrat Figueras, Jordi Savall, Hespèrion XXI, La Capella Reial de Catalunya Alia Vox AVSA9856 A+B, 2007.
- Johann Sebastian Bach: Tombeau de Sa Majesté la Reine de Pologne. Carlos Mena, Jan Kobow, Stephan MacLeod, Francis Jacob, Katherine Fuge, Philippe Pierlot, Ricercar Consort. Mirare, 2007.
- Giovanni Felice Sances: Stabat Mater. Carlos Mena, Philippe Pierlot, Ricercar Consort. Johann Heinrich Schmelzer, Johann Fux, Marco Antonio Ziani Mirare, 2008.
- Johann Sebastian Bach: Aus der Tieffen. Carlos Mena, Katharine Fuge, Hans Jörg Mammel, Stephan MacLeod, Philippe Pierlot, Ricercar Consort. Mirare, 2009.
- Domenico Scarlatti: Salve Regina. Carlos Mena, Nicolau de Figueiredo, Orquesta Barroca de Sevilla. OBS Prometeo, 2009.
- Johann Sebastian Bach: Magnificat. Carlos Mena, Anna Zander, Hans Jörg Mammel, Stephan MacLeod, Francis Jacob, Philippe Pierlot, Ricercar Consort. Mirare, 2010.
- Tomás Luis de Victoria: Et Jesum. Carlos Mena, Juan Carlos Rivera, Francisco Rubio Gallego. Harmonia Mundi Gold, 2010
- Blow & Purcell: Odes & Songs. Carlos Mena, Damien Guillon, Philippe Pierlot, Ricercar Consort. Mirare, 2010
- Johann Sebastian Bach: Passio secundum Johannem (Johannes-Passion). Maria Keohane, Helena Ek, Carlos Mena, Jan Börner, Hans Jörg Mammel, Jan Kobow, Matthias Vieweg, Stephan MacLeod, Philippe Pierlot, Ricercar Consort. Mirare, 2010.
- Miguel de Fuenllana: Orphénica Lyra, 1554. Núria Rial, Carlos Mena, Orphénica Lyra, José Miguel Moreno. Glossa, 2011 (recorded 1999).
- Johann Sebastian Bach: Missa 1733. Eugénie Warnier (soprano), Anna Reinhold (soprano), Carlos Mena (alto), Emiliano Gonzalez-Toro (tenor), Konstantin Wolff (bass), Raphaël Pichon (direction), Ensemble Pygmalion, Alpha 188, 2012.
- Jan Dismas Zelenka: Gaude laetare ZWV 168 | Missa Sanctissimae Trinitatis ZWV 17. Gabriela Eibenová (soprano), Carlos Mena (alto), Makoto Sakurada (tenor), Adam Viktora (conductor), Ensemble Inégal, Prague Baroque Soloists, Nibiru 01572231, 2013.
- Johann Sebastian Bach: In tempore nativitatis. Maria Keohane, Carlos Mena, Julian Prégardien, Stephan MacLeod, Philippe Pierlot, Ricercar Consort. Mirare, 2013.
- Antonio Caldara: La concordia de Pianeti. Andrea Marcon, Daniel Behle, Veronica Cangemi, Alexandra Donose, Franco Fagioli, David Galoustov, Carlos Mena, La Certa, Archiv Production, 2014.
- Disfonik Orchestra: Under the Shadow. Carlos Mena & The Disfonik Orchestra. Carlos Mena (alto), Ghalmia Senouci (alto), Jacques Beaud (bass & direction)The Disfonik Orchestra, Mirare 300, 2016.
