= Ricercar Consort =

Belgian instrumental ensemble

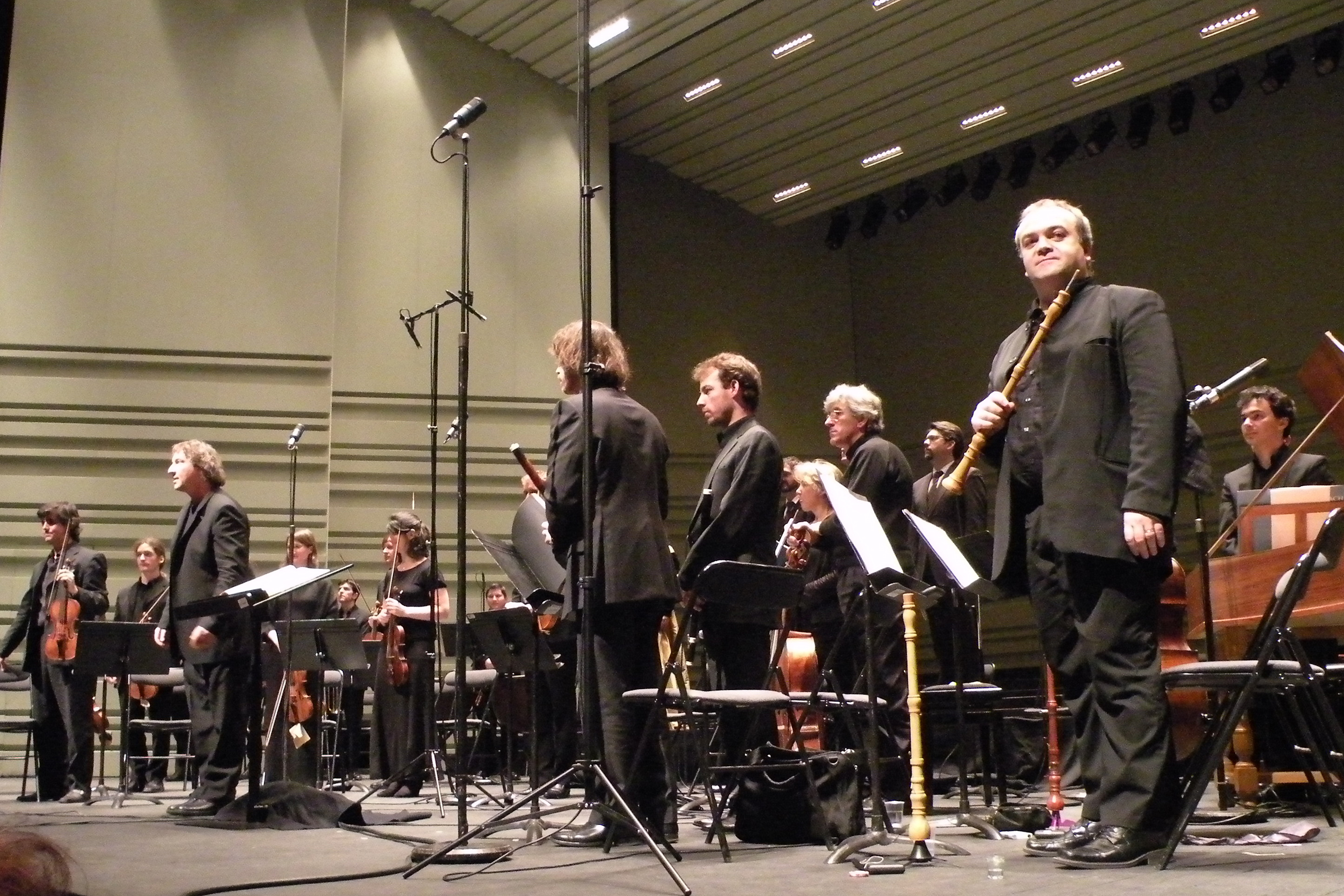
In concert at the Folle Journée de Nantes, 2009

The Ricercar Consort is a Belgian instrumental ensemble founded in 1980 together with the Ricercar record label of Jérôme Lejeune.

The founding members were violinist François Fernandez, organist Bernard Foccroulle, and viola da gamba player Philippe Pierlot. The initial repertoire was focussed on the German Baroque, and the Consort was closely identified with the series Deutsche Barock Kantaten. In recordings and concerts, the Consort was joined by baroque specialist singers including; Greta De Reyghere, Agnès Mellon, countertenors Henri Ledroit, James Bowman, tenor Guy de Mey, and bass Max van Egmond, as well as the cornett player Jean Tubéry.

The consort is associated with the Festival Bach en Vallée Mosane held in the valley of the Meuse.

== Recordings ==
The consort has recorded over 50 discs.

=== On Ricercar ===
- Deutsche Barock Kantaten Vol.I : Franz Tunder, Dieterich Buxtehude, Heinrich Schütz, Johann Philipp Krieger, Christoph Bernhard, Johann Rudolf Ahle, Leopold I. Countertenor Henri Ledroit (RIC 034008)
- Deutsche Barock Kantaten Vol.II : Dieterich Buxtehude, James Bowman (RIC 041016)
- Deutsche Barock Kantaten Vol.III : Cantatas for two sopranos. Franz Tunder, Johann Hermann Schein, Buxtehude (RIC 046023)
- Deutsche Barock Kantaten Vol.IV : Nikolaus Bruhns (2CD) Greta De Reyghere, Feldmann, James Bowman, Guy de Mey, Max van Egmond (RIC 048035/36)
- Deutsche Barock Kantaten Vol.V : Christmas cantatas – Andreas Hammerschmidt, Thomas Selle, Johann Hermann Schein (RIC 060048)
- Deutsche Barock Kantaten Vol.VI : Trauerkantaten / Funeral cantatas – Georg Philipp Telemann, Christian Ludwig Boxberg, Georg Riedel (Altstadt Kantor), and Johann Sebastian Bach Egmond. (RIC 079061)
- Deutsche Barock Kantaten Vol.VII : Dieterich Buxtehude (RIC 094076)
- Deutsche Barock Kantaten Vol.VIII : Aus der Tiefe (2CD) Bach's cantata, Balduin Hoyoul, Lupus Hellinck, Leonard Lechner (RIC 193086-87)
- Deutsche Barock Kantaten Vol.IX : Matthias Weckman (2CD) (RIC 1090097/098)
- Deutsche Barock Kantaten Vol.X : Cantatas for bass – Franz Tunder, Heinrich Schütz, Thomas Selle, Johann Christoph Bach Max van Egmond (RIC 206092)
- Deutsche Barock Kantaten Vol.XI : St Matthew Passion – Bach. RIC 160144
- Deutsche Barock Kantaten Vol.XII : Schütz - Die sieben Worte Jesu Christi am Kreuz, SWV 478; Historia der Auferstehung Jesu Christi SWV 50 (Agnes Mellon, Steve Dugardin, Mark Padmore, Paul Agnew, Stéphane van Dijck, Job Boswinkel; Ricercar Consort, Philippe Pierlot) (RIC206412)
- Deutsche Barock Kantaten Vol.XIII : Scheidt - Prima Pars Concertuum Sacrorum (La Fenice, Jean Tubéry; Philippe Pierlot) (RIC 206882)
- Motetti ed Arie a basso solo : Brevi, Bassani, Francesca Caccini, Maurizio Cazzati, Benedetto Marcello. Egmond, Pierlot 88 (Ricercar)
- Henry Du Mont: Grands Motets. Carlos Mena, Arnaud Marzorati, Stephan MacLeod, Philippe Pierlot, 2003.
- Telemann: Les Plaisirs de la table. Tafelmusik.
- Henry Purcell: Sonatas of III Parts; Sonatas in IV Parts. Ricercar Consort
- Alfonso Ferrabosco & William Byrd: Consort Music. James Bowman, Suzan Hamilton, Philippe Pierlot. 2CD
- Compilation: Deutsche Barock-Weihnacht 2CD.

=== On Mirare ===
- De Aeternitate Cantatas by Johann Christoph Bach, Johann Michael Bach, Christoph Bernhard, Johann Caspar Ferdinand Fischer, Christian Geist, Nikolaus Hasse, Melchior Hoffmann, Johann Adam Reincken, Christian Spahn. Countertenor Carlos Mena. Philippe Pierlot. 2004.
- Johann Sebastian Bach: Actus Tragicus. Carlos Mena, Katharine Fuge, Jan Kobow, Philippe Pierlot, Ricercar Consort. 2005.
- Giovanni Battista Pergolesi: Stabat Mater. Carlos Mena, Nuria Rial, Philippe Pierlot, Ricercar Consort. 2005.
- Vivaldi: Stabat Mater. Carlos Mena, François Fernandez, Marc Hantai, Philippe Pierlot, Ricercar Consort. 2006.
- Johann Sebastian Bach: Tombeau de Sa Majesté la Reine de Pologne. Carlos Mena, Jan Kobow, Stephan MacLeod, Francis Jacob, Katharine Fuge, Philippe Pierlot, Ricercar Consort. 2007.
- Giovanni Felice Sances: Stabat Mater. Carlos Mena, Philippe Pierlot, Ricercar Consort. Johann Heinrich Schmelzer, Johann Fux, Marco Antonio Ziani 2008.
- De Profundis. Bass cantatas by Nicolaus Bruhns, Dietrich Becker, Franz Tunder, and Dietrich Buxtehude. Stephan MacLeod. 2009.
- Johann Sebastian Bach: Aus der Tieffen. Carlos Mena, Katharine Fuge, Hans Jörg Mammel, Stephan MacLeod, Philippe Pierlot, Ricercar Consort. 2009.
- Johann Sebastian Bach: Magnificat. Carlos Mena, Anna Zander, Hans Jörg Mammel, Stephan MacLeod, Francis Jacob, Philippe Pierlot, Ricercar Consort. 2010.
