= Francis Jacob =

French organist and harpsichordist

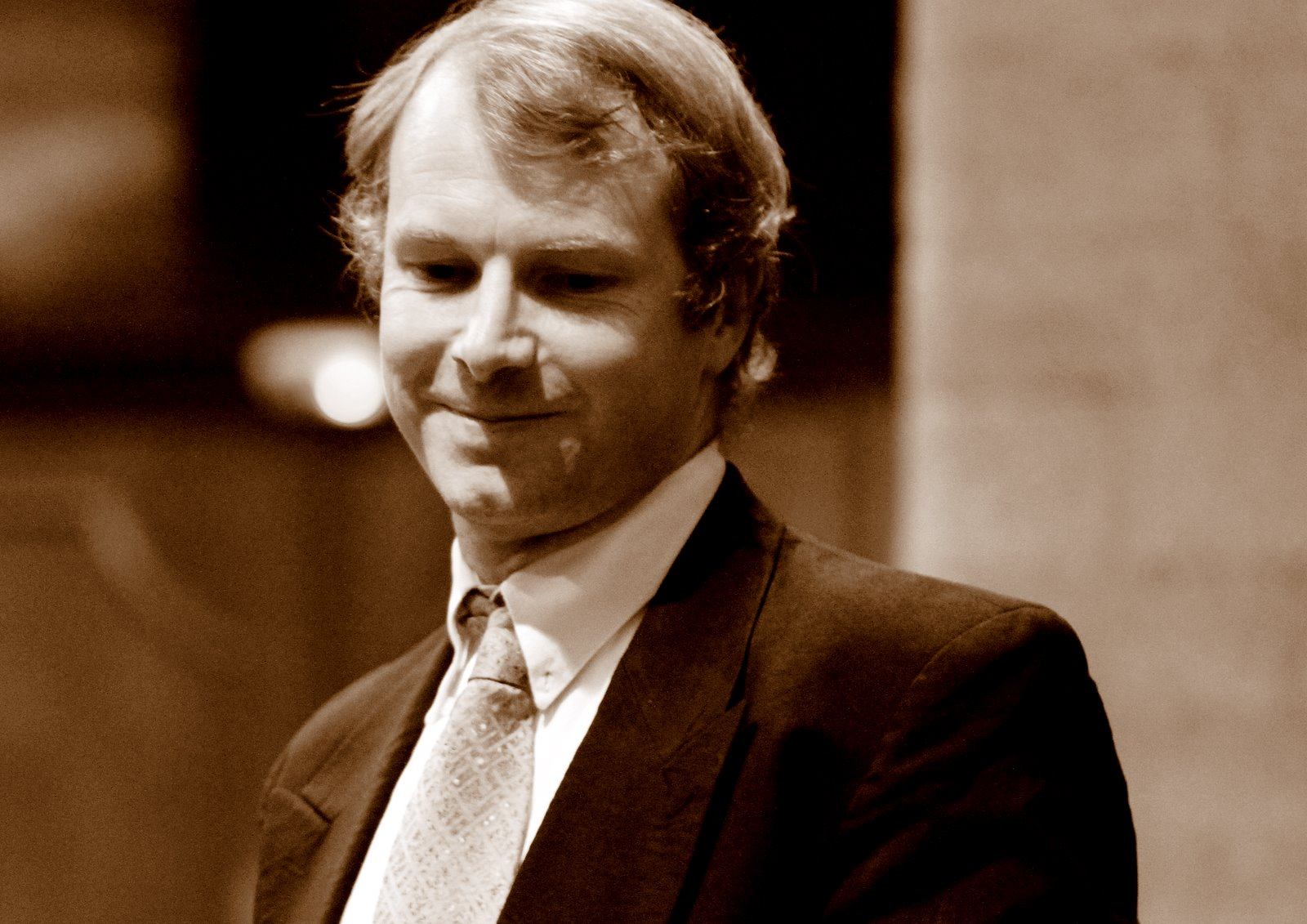
Francis Jacob

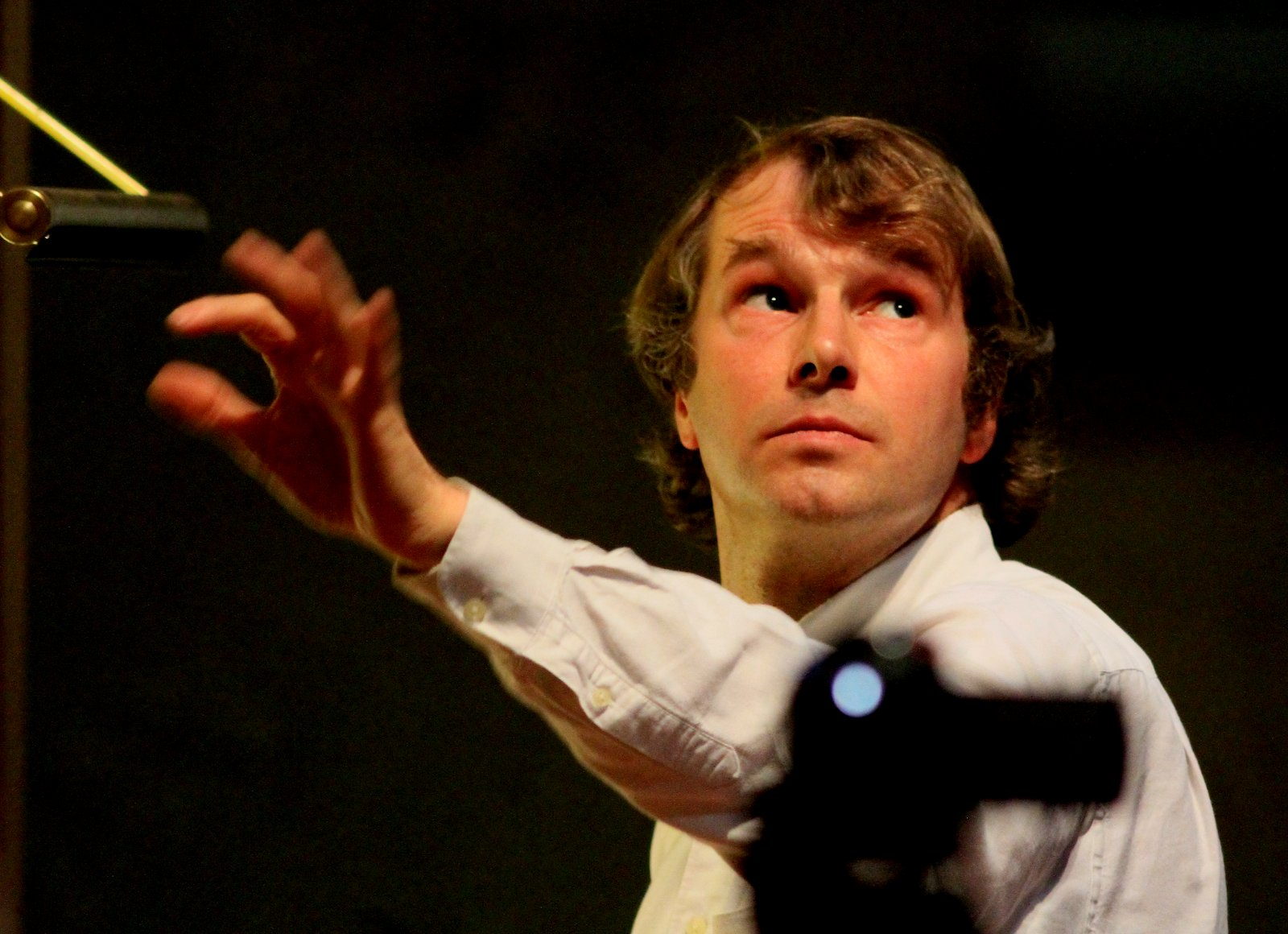
Francis Jacob

Francis Jacob (born 4 July 1972) is a French organist and harpsichordist.

== Biography ==
Born in Saverne, Jacob started playing the organ at a young age. He was only thirteen when he replaced the organist from Saessolsheim, who had fallen ill. He studied the organ with Sylvain Ciaravolo and André Stricker in Strasbourg and with Jean Boyer in Lyon. He studied the harpsichord with Aline Zylberajch in Strasbourg and with Jan-Willem Jansen in Toulouse, as well as basso continuo with Martin Gester in Strasbourg and with Jesper Christensen in Basel.

Jacob has taught organ and harpsichord at the Conservatoire de Perpignan, the Conservatoire de Toulouse and the Conservatoire de Montauban. Since 2001 he has been an organ and basso continuo teacher at the Conservatoire de Strasbourg.

He performs as soloist on organ and harpsichord, and in the chamber and orchestral music, particularly with the Ricercar Consort, the Concert Royal, Gli Angeli, and other ensembles.

He is very interested in organ building, which he practises with Bernard Aubertin in Courtefontaine.

He is still the organist of Saessolsheim, where he succeeded, with the help of the Saessolsheim Organ Friends’ Association, in enriching the church with a new Aubertin organ, which energised the cultural life of the village.

== Selected discography ==
=== As soloist ===
All CDs in this section were recorded on Aubertin organs.

- "Francis Jacob à l'orgue Aubertin de Sæssolsheim" (1995). CD and cassette, with works by Johann Sebastian Bach, Dietrich Buxtehude, Henry Purcell, Thomas Tomkins and Georg Böhm. Production and distribution: Association des Amis de l'Orgue de Saessolsheim.
- "L'orgue Herbuté-Aubertin d'Uffheim" (1998). Works by ten composers from the 18th and 19th centuries. Pamina SPM 1654.
- "Pièces pour orgue" by J.S. Bach (2000, organ of Saessolsheim). Zig-Zag Territoires ZZT 001001.
- "Pieces for organ" by Dietrich Buxtehude (2003, organ of the Église Saint-Martin de Vertus). Zig Zag Territoires ZZT 030901.
- J.S. "Bach Clavier-Übung III" (2005, organ of the Saint-Louis-en-l'Île Church). Zig Zag Territoires ZZT 050901.2.
- Union Musicale of Saint-Loup-sur-Thouet (tracks 1–13; Wolfgang Amadeus Mozart, Georg Böhm and J.S. Bach). 1999
- Association of Friends of the Organ of Clairvaux-les-Lacs (works by ten composers from the 15th to the 19th century); with Guy Ferber, baroque trumpet. 2012.
- The Protestant parish of Kamata at Ōta (Jean-Adam Guilain, Louis Couperin, Johann Kaspar Kerll and J.S. Bach), 2013.
- "Les Couperin", works by Louis Couperin, François Couperin, Armand-Louis Couperin, organ of Bellelay, Switzerland. 2014.

=== As continuist ===
He has recorded CDs with Le Parlement de Musique and the Ricercar Consort, among others. On some of the first ten CDs mentioned below, which he recorded with the Ricercar Consort under the direction of Philippe Pierlot, he also plays works by J.S. Bach as organ soloist.

- Samuel Capricornus (1628-1665): Theatrum Musicum — and works by Couperin and Montéclair — with Le Parlement de Musique (Martin Gester). 1993. Opus 111. OPS 30-99.
- "Louis-Nicolas Clérambault: La Muse de l'Opéra", with Le Parlement de Musique (Martin Gester). 1999. Assai. Qobuz.
- Henry Du Mont: "Grands Motets", with the Namur Chamber Choir. 2003. Ricercar RIC202.
- "Giovanni Legrenzi: Dies Irae – Sonata a quattro viole – Motetti". 2004. Ricercar RIC 236.
- J.S. "Bach: Actus Tragicus" (= BWV 106) and the BWV 18 and BWV 150 cantatas. 2005. Mirare MIR002.
- "J.S. Bach's cantata BWV 198; includes the Missa brevis, BWV 234. 2007. Mirare MIR030.
- De Profundis: Johann Christoph Friedrich Bach, Nicolaus Bruhns, Buxtehude, Franz Tunder, with Stephan MacLeod and François Fernandez. 2008. Mirare: MIR041.
- "Bach: Aus der Tieffen" (cantata 131; includes cantata 182 and cantata 4). 2009. Mirare MIR057.
- J.S. Bach: Magnificat; includes the Missa brevis, BWV 235. 2009. Mirare MIR102.
- Johann Sebastian Bach: In tempore nativitatis (three cantatas for Christmas time, BWV 63, BWV 110 & BWV 153). 2013, Mirare MIR243.
- De Aeternitate (works by ten German composers of the 17th and 18th centuries), with Carlos Mena, countertenor. 2002, Mirare MIR9911.
- J.S. Bach "Johannes Passion", BWV 2245. 2011, Mirare MIR136.
- "Antonio Bertali: Valoroso" (includes some anonymous works). 2004, Mirare MIR9969.
- "German & French Chamber Music 1633–1767 (Philipp Heinrich Erlebach, Johann Philipp Krieger, François Couperin & Marin Marais) with Le Rêve d'Orphée under the direction of Jakob David Rattinger. 2010, Classic Concert Records CCR 62023.
- "Töne von meiner Flöten" (Jean Gaspard Weiss) with Antichi Strumenti. 2012, Stradivarius STR 33916.
- "Guillemain Sonates", 4 sonatas by Louis-Gabriel Guillemain (1705–1770) — traverso, violin, viol, cello, harpsichord — with Barock-in (direction Kozue Sato, traverso). 2014. Raumklang RK 3304.
