= Gelobet sei der Herr, mein Gott, BWV 129 =

Chorale cantata by Johann Sebastian Bach

Gelobet sei der Herr, mein Gott
- BWV 129
- Chorale cantata by J. S. Bach
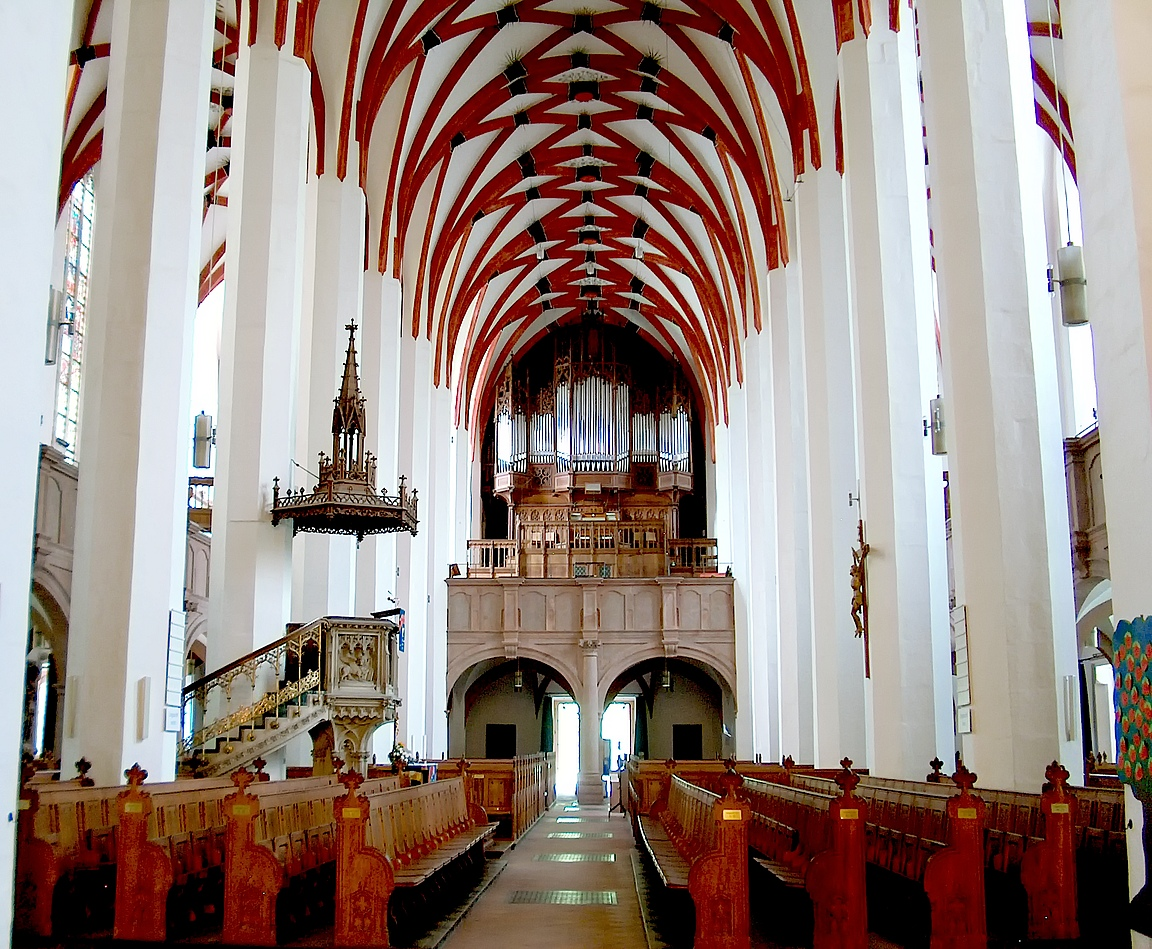
- Thomaskirche, Leipzig
- Occasion: Trinity Sunday
- Chorale: "Gelobet sei der Herr, mein Gott" by Johann Olearius
- Performed: 8 June 1727: Leipzig
- Movements: 5
- Vocal: SATB choir; solo: soprano, alto and bass
- Instrumental: 3 trumpets; timpani; flauto traverso; 2 oboes; oboe d'amore; 2 violins; viola; continuo

Gelobet sei der Herr, mein Gott (Praised be the Lord, my God), BWV 129, is a church cantata by Johann Sebastian Bach. It is a chorale cantata. The cantata is festively scored and ends in a chorale fantasia, like the Christmas Oratorio.

It was performed on Trinity Sunday 8 June 1727 in Leipzig. Rediscovery of the printed libretto of the cantata in the first decade of the 21st century led to a re-appraisal of prior assumptions regarding the early performance chronology of a few cantatas, including this one.

== History and words ==
The cantata was apparently composed for Trinity Sunday. The text of the cantata is a general praise of the Trinity, without a reference to a specific gospel reading. Addressing God the Creator, the Saviour and the Comforter, it could be used for other occasions such as Reformation Day.

In his second year at Leipzig Bach had composed chorale cantatas between the first Sunday after Trinity of 1724 and Palm Sunday 1725, but for Easter that year he had returned to cantatas on more varied texts, possibly because he lost his librettist. Later Bach returned to composing chorale cantatas, possibly with the intention of completing his second annual cycle. This cantata is one of these later chorale cantatas, and it was thought that it was performed in 1726. Rediscovery of the printed libretto of the cantata in the first decade of the 21st century led to a re-appraisal of prior assumptions regarding the first performance of this cantata: it was performed on Trinity Sunday 8 June 1727. The work was revived during the composer´s lifetime and in the 1750s after the composer´s death.

The cantata is based entirely on the unchanged words on the hymn Gelobet sei der Herr, mein Gott (1665) by Johann Olearius and celebrates the Trinity in five stanzas. The prescribed readings for Trinity Sunday were from the Epistle to the Romans, reflecting "depth of wisdom" (Romans 11:33–36), and from the Gospel of John, the meeting of Jesus and Nicodemus (John 3:1–15). Unlike most chorale cantatas of 1724/25, but similar to the early Christ lag in Todes Banden, BWV 4, and Lobe den Herren, den mächtigen König der Ehren, BWV 137, also composed after the second cantata cycle, Bach left the chorale text unchanged, thus without a reference to the readings.

== Scoring and structure ==
The cantata in five movements is festively scored for three soloists, soprano, alto and bass, a four-part choir, three trumpets, timpani, flauto traverso, two oboes, oboe d'amore, two violins, viola, and basso continuo.

1. Coro: Gelobet sei der Herr, mein Gott
2. Aria (bass): Gelobet sei der Herr, mein Gott, mein Heil
3. Aria (soprano): Gelobet sei der Herr, mein Gott, mein Trost
4. Aria (alto): Gelobet sei der Herr, mein Gott, der ewig lebet
5. Chorale: Dem wir das Heilig jetzt

== Music ==
The opening chorus on the first stanza of the chorale begins with a concerto of all the instruments as a ritornello. The trumpets highlight occasionally the interplay of strings and woodwinds. The cantus firmus, a melody of O Gott, du frommer Gott by Ahasverus Fritsch (1679), is sung by the soprano, while the other voices sing sometimes in imitation, sometimes in homophony. The text is in praise of the God the Creator.

The following three movements are all arias. In the first aria the bass praises God the Saviour, accompanied only by the continuo. Bach may have thought of the vox Christi (voice of Christ), and of his humility. The word "Gelobet" (praised) is set as an expressive melisma. In the second aria the soprano, accompanied by flute and violin, praises God the Comforter. In the third aria the alto is accompanied by an oboe d'amore in song-like general praise. John Eliot Gardiner suggests that the "pastoral dance" was "inspired, perhaps in its imagery, by the concept of "den alles lobet, was in allen Lüften schwebet" (praised by all things that move in the air). The final chorale is set in a joyful concerto of the instruments, similar to the conclusions of Bach's Christmas Oratorio and Ascension Oratorio, punctuated by fanfares. By this festive ending Bach marked Trinity Sunday as the conclusion of the first part of the liturgical year.

== Publication ==
The cantata was first published in 1878 in the first complete edition of the works of Bach, Joh. Seb. Bach's Werke. The editor was Alfred Dörffel.

== Recordings ==
- J. S. Bach: Cantatas BWV 119 & BWV 129, Diethard Hellmann, Bach-Chor Mainz, Bach-Orchester Mainz, Lotte Wolf-Matthäus, Ursula Buckel, Margrit Conrad, Carl-Heinz Müller, Cantate 1968
- Bach Cantatas Vol. 3 – Ascension Day, Whitsun, Trinity, Karl Richter, Münchener Bach-Chor, Münchener Bach-Orchester, Edith Mathis, Anna Reynolds, Peter Schreier, Dietrich Fischer-Dieskau, Archiv Produktion 1975
- Die Bach Kantate Vol. 10, Helmuth Rilling, Gächinger Kantorei, Bach-Collegium Stuttgart, Arleen Augér, Gabriele Schreckenbach, Philippe Huttenlocher, Hänssler 1982
- J. S. Bach: Das Kantatenwerk – Sacred Cantatas Vol. 7, Gustav Leonhardt, Knabenchor Hannover, Collegium Vocale Gent, Leonhardt-Consort, Sebastian Hennig (soloist of the Knabenchor Hannover), René Jacobs, Max van Egmond, Teldec 1983
- Bach Cantatas Vol. 27: Blythburgh/Kirkwall, John Eliot Gardiner, Monteverdi Choir, English Baroque Soloists, Ruth Holton, Daniel Taylor, Peter Harvey, Soli Deo Gloria 2000
- J. S. Bach: Complete Cantatas Vol. 19, Ton Koopman, Amsterdam Baroque Orchestra & Choir, Johannette Zomer, Bogna Bartosz, Christoph Prégardien, Klaus Mertens, Antoine Marchand 2002
- J. S. Bach: Cantatas Vol. 45 (Cantatas from Leipzig 1725), Masaaki Suzuki, Bach Collegium Japan, Yukari Nonoshita, Robin Blaze, Peter Kooy, BIS 2009
- Cantatas 51-53 (The Complete Chorale Cantatas), Stephan MacLeod, Gli Angeli Genève. Aparté. Release date 2025

== Sources ==
- Literature by and about Gelobet sei der Herr, mein Gott, BWV 129 in the German National Library catalogue
- Gelobet sei der Herr, mein Gott, BWV 129: Scores at the International Music Score Library Project
- Gelobet sei der Herr, mein Gott BWV 129; BC A 93 / Chorale cantata (Trinity Sunday) Bach Digital
- Cantata BWV 129 Gelobet sei der Herr, mein Gott history, scoring, sources for text and music, translations to various languages, discography, discussion, Bach Cantatas Website
- BWV 129 Gelobet sei der Herr, mein Gott English translation, University of Vermont
- BWV 129 Gelobet sei der Herr, mein Gott text, scoring, University of Alberta
- Luke Dahn: BWV 129.5 bach-chorales.com
