= Johann Sebastiani =

German composer

Johann Sebastiani (30 September 1622 – 1683) was a German baroque composer.

== Biography ==
Sebastiani was born in Weimar. He became Kantor at Königsberg cathedral in 1661, and court Kapellmeister from 1663 to 1679. He died in Königsberg. His works include sacred and occasional pieces and songs; the most famous is his St Matthew Passion (before 1663, performed again 1672). He is the first composer to introduce chorale into oratorio passion. Within the St Matthew Passion, Sebastiani includes eight different chorale melodies and introduces thirteen chorale verses. This work is a development from the style of Heinrich Schütz which includes recitatives and arias but avoids a dramatic operatic idiom, and marks an intermediate position between Schütz and Bach such as those of Johann Theile and Johann Valentin Meder. Two violins accompany Christ, who is a bass; three viols accompany Evangelist, who is a tenor, Judas, who is an alto, and the other characters. In 1672 Sebastiani got married and from that point until the end of his life he was concerned primarily with the publication of his works. In 1672, he published a collection entitled Erster Theil Der Parnaß-Blumen, Oder Geist- und Weltliche Lieder.

== Recordings ==
- Matthäus-Passion 1672. Soprano Greta De Reyghere, countertenor Vincent Grégoire, tenors Stephan Van Dyck, Hervé Lamy, bass Max van Egmond, Ricercar Consort, dir. Philippe Pierlot. Ricercar Deutsche Barock-Kantaten Vol. XI 1996
