= Johann Olearius =

Johann Olearius may refer to:

- Johann Olearius (1611–1684) a German hymnwriter, preacher, and academic.
- Johann Gottfried Olearius (1635–1711) a German preacher and horticulturalist
- Johann Christoph Olearius (1668–1747) deacon of the Bach Church, Arnstadt
