= Georg Riedel (Altstadt Kantor) =

Georg Riedel (6 June 1676 – 5 February 1738, in Königsberg) was a German composer and cantor. He has been referred to as the "East Prussian Bach".

Riedel was a native of Sensburg (Mrągowo), in the Duchy of Prussia. In 1694 Riedel entered the University of Königsberg to study theology. He wrote a serenade, since lost, for the celebrations of the coronation of Frederick I of Prussia in 1701 as well as other occasional works for inaugurations, weddings, birthdays and funerals. In 1709 he was appointed cantor at Altstadt Church, one of Königsberg’s three key musical positions, which he occupied until his death.

Riedel's unique monumental settings of the entire Gospel of Matthew, the entire Book of Psalms, and the entire Book of Revelation, were preserved in the Königsberg Public Library. His compositions are probably lost due to the destruction of Königsberg in 1944 and 1945 during World War II. There is, however, still hope that Riedel's works may be recovered in the future, as parts of the various archives of Kaliningrad, post-war Königsberg, were distributed among Polish and Soviet institutions.

It is not clear if he is related to another Georg Riedel, born 1715 in Neidenburg (Nidzica), who was cantor first of the Löbenicht Church in Königsberg (1749–1753), then at Königsberg Cathedral (1753 to his death in 1791).

== Works ==
Monumental oratorios:

- Evangelium Sanct Matthäi 1721
- Psalmen Davids 1724
- Offenbarung 1734

Occasional works:

- around 140 works

== Recordings ==
- Cantata "Harmonische Freude frommer Seelen" on Trauerkantaten. Reyghere, Bowman, Mey, Egmond, Ricercar Consort. Ricercar.
