= Christian Ludwig Boxberg =

German composer and organist

Christian Ludwig Boxberg (Sondershausen 24 April 1670 – Görlitz 1 December 1729) was a German composer and organist.

From 1692 to 1700 Boxberg was active as an opera composer. His operas were performed in Leipzig, Wolfenbüttel, Kassel and Ansbach. From 1702 to 1729 he was Kapellmeister at the Church of St. Peter and Paul in Görlitz.

== Works ==
Operas:

- Orion
- Die verschwiegene Treue
- Sardanapalus (1698)

Cantatas:

- Herr, tue meine Lippen auf
- Machet die Tore weit

== Recordings ==
- Cantata "Bestelle dein Haus" on Trauerkantaten. Reyghere, Bowman, Mey, Egmond, Ricercar Consort. Ricercar.
- Boxberg: Sardanapalus (Oper in deutscher Sprache 1698) United Continuo Ensemble directed Jorg Meder, Pan Classics 2014
