= Es wartet alles auf dich, BWV 187 =

Church cantata by Johann Sebastian Bach

Es wartet alles auf dich
- BWV 187
- Church cantata by Johann Sebastian Bach
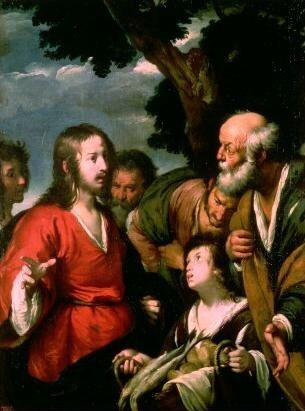
- Jesus feeding a crowd with five loaves of bread and two fish by Bernardi Strazzi, early 17th century
- Related: Missa in G minor, BWV 235
- Occasion: Seventh Sunday after Trinity
- Bible text: Psalm 104:27–28; Matthew 6:31–32
- Chorale: by Hans Vogel
- Performed: 4 August 1726: Leipzig
- Movements: 7 in two parts (3 + 4)
- Vocal: SATB choir; solo: soprano, alto, bass
- Instrumental: 2 oboes; 2 violins; viola; continuo

Johann Sebastian Bach composed the church cantata Es wartet alles auf dich (Everything waits for You), BWV 187 in Leipzig for the seventh Sunday after Trinity and first performed it on 4 August 1726.

The text came from a 1704 libretto cycle published in Meiningen, following a symmetrical pattern in seven movements, which opens with a quotation from the Old Testament, is focused on a central quotation from the New Testament, and ends with a closing chorale. Symmetrical recitatives and arias form the other movements. Bach set the opening as a chorus based on two verses from Psalm 104, set the central movement as a bass solo on a quotation from the Sermon on the Mount, and concluded with two stanzas from Hans Vogel's hymn "Singen wir aus Herzensgrund" in a four-part setting. The arias and recitatives are performed by three vocal soloists. The cantata is scored for a Baroque instrumental ensemble of two oboes, strings and continuo.

Bach later used the music from four movements of this cantata for his Missa in G minor, BWV 235.

== History and words ==
Bach wrote the cantata in 1726 for the Seventh Sunday after Trinity as part of his third cantata cycle. The prescribed readings for the Sunday are from the Epistle to the Romans, "the wages of sin is death; but the gift of God is eternal life" (Romans 6:19–23), and from the Gospel of Mark, the feeding of the 4000 (Mark 8:1–9).

During 1726, Bach had performed several cantatas by his cousin Johann Ludwig Bach who worked in Meiningen, from 2 February (Purification) to 30 May (Ascension). The texts for these cantatas came from a 1704 anonymous libretto cycle published in Meiningen. They follow a symmetrical pattern: structured in seven movements, they begin with a chorus on a quotation from the Old Testament, turn in the central movement to a quotation from the New Testament, and end with a closing chorale, while a librettist added text for the inner movements as recitatives and arias.

Bach began to compose cantatas on texts in this format on the first Sunday after Trinity in 1726, with Brich dem Hungrigen dein Brot, BWV 39. The text for Es wartet alles auf dich follows the same pattern. The opening chorus is based on Psalms 104:27–28, directly related to the reading. A possible parallel source is Psalm 145:15-16.

Part two is opened by a bass solo on Matthew 6:31–32 from the Sermon on the Mount. The cantata is closed by stanzas 4 and 6 of Hans Vogel's hymn "Singen wir aus Herzensgrund" (1563). The poet of the other movements is unknown; Walther Blankenburg suggested Christoph Helm. The librettist paraphrased in the third movement Psalms 65:12.

Bach first performed the cantata on 4 August 1726. He used the music of four movements, the opening chorus and the arias, for four movements of the Gloria of his Missa in G minor, BWV 235.

== Music ==
=== Structure and scoring ===
Bach structured the cantata in seven movements in two parts, the first three movements to be performed before the sermon, the others after the sermon. The first movement is a choral setting of psalm verses, followed by recitative and aria, the fourth movement is a bass solo on a quotation of Jesus, followed by aria and recitative, and closed by a chorale. Bach scored the work for three vocal soloists (soprano (S), alto (A) and bass (B)), a four-part choir, and a Baroque instrumental ensemble: two oboes (Ob), two violins (Vl), viola (Va), and basso continuo (Bc). The duration of the cantata is around 25 minutes.

In the following table of the movements, the scoring follows the Neue Bach-Ausgabe. The keys and time signatures are taken from the Bach scholar Alfred Dürr, using the symbol for common time (4/4). The instruments are shown separately for winds and strings, while the continuo, playing throughout, is not shown.

Movements of Es wartet alles auf dich, Part I
No.	Title	Text	Type	Vocal	Winds	Strings	Key	Time
1	Es wartet alles auf dich	Psalms 104:27–28	Chorus	SATB	2Ob	2Vl Va	G minor	common time
2	Was Kreaturen hält, das große Rund der Welt	anon.	Recitative	B				common time
3	Du, Herr, du krönst allein das Jahr	anon.	Aria	A	Ob	2Vl Va	B♭ major	3/8

Movements of Es wartet alles auf dich, Part II
No.	Title	Text	Type	Vocal	Winds	Strings	Key	Time
4	Darum sollt ihr nicht sorgen	Matthew 6:31–32	Basso solo	B		2Vl	G minor	common time
5	Gott versorget alles Leben	anon.	Aria	S	Ob		E♭ major	3/8
6	Halt ich nur fest an ihm	anon.	Recitative	S				common time
7	Gott hat die Erde zugericht	Vogel	Chorale	SATB	2Ob	2Vl Va	G minor	3/4

=== Movements ===
==== 1 ====
The opening chorus is a setting of psalm verses, "Es wartet alles auf dich, daß du ihnen Speise gebest zu seiner Zeit." (These wait all upon You, that you may give them nourishment in due saeson). Grammatically this is a passive form where the subject (God) comes after the verb. This underlines the faith of the writer, who knows (s)he can totally rely on God for his/her daily needs. The following subjunctive (conditional form) underlines that God does this by grace, totally undeserved by the recipient. This is central to Bach's Lutheran faith.

These verses are often used as a prayer before a meal. Bach achieves a unity of form, but at the same time an individual handling of the four ideas of the text, as in a motet. The motifs of the instrumental sinfonia of 28 measures are continued through most of the movement, creating unity. "Es wartet alles auf dich" (a) is expressed in free polyphony embedded in the instrumental music, then repeated together with "daß du ihnen Speise gibest" (b) in free polyphony with canonic imitation on two themes, with the instruments playing mostly colla parte, then a and b are repeated within a part of the sinfonia, which is continued instrumentally. In the following second section, "Wenn du ihnen gibest …" (c) is the theme of a choral fugue, "Wenn du deine Hand auftust …" (d) is the countersubject. The instruments play colla parte first, then add motifs from the sinfonia. In the third concluding section the complete text is repeated within a part of the sinfonia.

==== 2 ====
In the first recitative, "Was Kreaturen hält das große Rund der Welt!" (What creatures are contained by the great sphere of the world!), the librettist paraphases ideas from verses 17 to 25 of the same psalm, which praises God as the Creator of the universe.

==== 3 ====
The first aria addresses God as the sustainer of life: "Du Herr, du krönst allein das Jahr mit deinem Gut." (You Lord, You alone crown the year with Your good.), in a close paraphrase of Psalms 65:12. The alto voice is accompanied by the full orchestra in a dance-rhythm with irregular grouping of measures in the ritornellos.

==== 4 ====
The fourth and central movement sets the biblical words "Darum sollt ihr nicht sorgen noch sagen: Was werden wir essen, was werden wir trinken" (Therefore, do not be anxious, saying: "What will we eat, what will we drink), from the Sermon on the Mount. Bach gives them to the bass as the vox Christi (voice of Christ), accompanied by the violins in unison and the continuo, which also takes part in their motifs.

==== 5 ====
The soprano aria, "Gott versorget alles Leben" (God takes care of every life), is in two contrasting parts. The first section is accompanied by festive dotted rhythms and a broad melody of the solo oboe, the second section, marked un poco allegro, is again like a dance. Only the instruments repeat afterwards the dotted rhythm of the beginning.

==== 6 ====
In the recitative "Halt ich nur fest an ihm mit kindlichem Vertrauen" (If I can only hold onto Him with childlike trust), the last words of the soprano are enriched by the strings, like the vox Christi in Bach's St Matthew Passion.

==== 7 ====
The final chorale is a four-part setting for the choir and all instruments. It features two stanzas of the hymn. The fourth stanza, "Gott hat die Erde zugericht'" (God has provided for the earth) relates to the beginning, God as the Creator, while the sixth stanza, "Wir danken sehr und bitten ihn, daß er uns geb des Geistes Sinn, daß wir solches recht verstehn" (We thank profoundly and pray to Him that He give us the will of His Spirit, that we understand it rightly), expresses thanksgiving, ending on the Latin word "Gratias".

== Publication ==
The cantata was published in the first edition of Bach's works by the Bach-Gesellschaft in volume 37, edited by Alfred Dörffel in 1891. In the Neue Bach-Ausgabe, it appeared in volume I/18 in 1966, edited by Leo Treitler, followed by a critical report in 1967.

== Recordings ==
A list of recordings is provided on the Bach Cantatas Website. Ensembles playing period instruments in historically informed performance are shown with green background.

Recordings of Es wartet alles auf dich
Title	Conductor / Choir / Orchestra	Soloists	Label	Year	Orch. type
J. S. Bach: Cantatas BWV 187 & BWV 34	Diethard Hellmann Kantorei & Kammerorchester der Christuskirche Mainz	Lotte Wolf-Matthäus; Hans-Joachim Rotzsch; Olaf Erksen	Cantate	1958	chamber
Die Bach Kantate Vol. 44	Helmuth Rilling Gächinger Kantorei Bach-Collegium Stuttgart	Maria Friesenhausen; Hildegard Laurich; Wolfgang Schöne	Hänssler	1971	
Bach Cantatas Vol. 4 – Sundays after Trinity I	Karl Richter Münchener Bach-Chor Münchener Bach-Orchester	Edith Mathis; Julia Hamari; Dietrich Fischer-Dieskau	Archiv Produktion	1977	
J. S. Bach: Das Kantatenwerk • Complete Cantatas • Les Cantates, Folge / Vol. 43	Gustav Leonhardt: Knabenchor Hannover; Collegium Vocale Gent; Leonhardt-Consort	soloist of the Knabenchor Hannover; Paul Esswood; Max van Egmond	Teldec	1989	Period
Bach Edition Vol. 15 – Cantatas Vol. 8	Pieter Jan Leusink Holland Boys Choir Netherlands Bach Collegium	Ruth Holton; Sytse Buwalda; Bas Ramselaar	Brilliant Classics	2000	Period
Bach Cantatas Ansbach/Haddinton / For the 7th Sunday after Trinity (BWV 186, 107, 187)	John Eliot Gardiner Monteverdi Choir English Baroque Soloists	Katharine Fuge; Richard Wyn Roberts; Stephan Loges	Soli Deo Gloria	2000	Period
J. S. Bach: Complete Cantatas Vol. 18	Ton Koopman Amsterdam Baroque Orchestra & Choir	Sandrine Piau; Bogna Bartosz; Klaus Mertens	Antoine Marchand	2002	Period
J. S. Bach: Cantatas Vol. 45 – (BWV 39, 187, 129, 1045)	Masaaki Suzuki Bach Collegium Japan	Yukari Nonoshita; Robin Blaze; Peter Kooy	BIS	2009	Period

== Bibliography ==
General

- "Es wartet alles auf dich BWV 187; BC A 110 / Sacred cantata (7th Sunday after Trinity)". Bach Digital. 2017.

Books

- Dürr, Alfred; Jones, Richard D. P. (2006). The Cantatas of J. S. Bach: With Their Librettos in German-English Parallel Text. Oxford University Press. pp. 449–452. ISBN 978-0-19-929776-4.
- Rempp, Frieder (2016). "Foreword". Es wartet alles auf dich / They all are waiting on thee / BWV 187 (PDF). Carus-Verlag. pp. 2–3.

Online sources

- Dellal, Pamela (2014). "BWV 187– Es wartet alles auf dich". Emmanuel Music.
- Gardiner, John Eliot (2009). Bach: Cantatas Nos 9, 107, 170, 186 & 187 (Cantatas Vol 4) (Media notes). Soli Deo Gloria (at Hyperion Records website).
- Mincham, Julian (2010). "Chapter 20 BWV 187 Es wartet alles auf dich / Now do all men look upon You". jsbachcantatas.com.
- Steinitz, Margaret. "Bach's Latin Church Music". London Bach Society. Archived from the original on 15 July 2011.
