= Greta De Reyghere =

Belgian soprano

- Born: Malines, Belgium
- Education: Brussels Conservatory
- Occupations: Classical soprano; Academic voice teacher
- Organizations: Ricercar Consort; Capella Brugensis; Royal Conservatory of Liège

Greta De Reyghere is a Belgian soprano who specializes in early music and Baroque music in historically informed performance but also performs a variety of other classical music in concert. She is a teacher at the Royal Conservatory of Liège.

== Career ==
Born in Malines, De Reyghere studied voice at the Brussels Conservatory, where she received diplomas in concert singing, opera and art song. She continued her studies with Alfred Deller and Erik Werba.

De Reyghere recorded in 1992 Bach's motets with Sigiswald Kuijken and La Petite Bande. She has collaborated in the 1980s and 1990s with the ensemble Ricercar Consort conducted by Philippe Pierlot, performing choral music with one voice per part. They recorded several Bach cantatas, including in 1995 Christ lag in Todes Banden, BWV 4. In 1996 a live performance of Bach's St John Passion was recorded at the 13th-century Begijnhofkerk of the beguinage of Sint-Truiden, the Beguinage St. Agnes, with Paul Dombrecht conducting the ensemble Il Fondamento, Ian Honeyman as the Evangelist and Werner Van Mechelen as the vox Christi (voice of Christ).

She collaborated frequently with the Capella Brugensis and the Collegium Instrumentale Brugense in Bruges, conducted by Patrick Peire. In 1999 she sang Flos carmeli, Op. 106, a church cantata for soprano, women's choir and small orchestra, by the Bruges composer Joseph Ryelandt, with Ignace Michiels at the organ. In 2000 they recorded Bach's four short masses, with Wilke te Brummelstroete, James Gilchrist and Jan van der Crabben. Works by Mozart included his Vesperae solennes de Dominica and Vesperae solennes de confessore. In 2003 the focus was on works by Joseph-Hector Fiocco, his Missa solemnis in D and Homo quidam. A reviewer of a recording of motets and psalm settings by Felix Mendelssohn noted her "under-statement and beauty of line and texture".

De Reyghere has been a voice teacher at the Royal Conservatory of Liège. Among her students is soprano Sophie Karthäuser.

== Selected recordings ==
With La Petite Bande

- 1989: Bach: Magnificat, BWV 243, and cantata Ich hatte viel Bekümmernis, BWV 21, with the Nederlands Kamerchoor
- 2010 : Carl Philipp Emanuel Bach: Die letzten Leiden des Erlösers, with Collegium Vocale Gent

With Ricercar Consort

- 1988: Oeuvres pour le Port-Royal de Marc-Antoine Charpentier, with Jill Feldman, Isabelle Poulenard and Bernard Foccroulle
- 1988: Deutsche Barock Kantaten (III) (works by Franz Tunder, Johann Hermann Schein, Buxtehude), with Agnès Mellon
- 1989: Deutsche Barock Kantaten (V) (Christmas cantatas by Andreas Hammerschmidt, Thomas Selle, Schein, Schütz, Tunder, Weckmann), with Agnès Mellon and Dominique Visse
- 1989: Motets à deux voix by Henri Dumont, with Agnès Mellon, James Bowman, Guy de Mey and Max van Egmond
- 1992: Die Familie Bach, with Collegium Vocale et Capella Sancti Michaelis
- 1995: Matthäus Passion (1672) by Johann Sebastiani (Deutsche Barock Kantaten XI)

=== Other ===
- 1983: Les Oiseaux French and German art songs by Beethoven, Schubert, Brahms, Strauss, Wolf, Berg, Mozart, Gounod, Berlioz, Chausson, de Falla, Milhaud, Ravel, Poulenc, Werfel; with Benjamin Rawitz, piano. Zephyr Records Z19.
- 1987: Church Cantatas and Arias by Telemann, with Telemann Consort and Vokaal Ensemble Rundadinella, Gent, conducted by Florian Heyerick
- 1993: Requiem in C major and Miserere in E minor by Johann Adolph Hasse, with Il Fondamento, conducted by Paul Dombrecht
- 2002: De Profundis, levavi oculos meos by Franz-Joseph Krafft, with Il Fondamento et La Sfera Del Canto, conducted by Paul Dombrecht
