= Lutheran Mass =

Lutheran Mass may refer to:

- Eucharist in Lutheranism
  - Mass (liturgy) § Lutheran Churches
  - Divine Service (Lutheran)
- Kyrie–Gloria Mass, a form of Mass composition
  - Kyrie–Gloria Masses, BWV 233–236, also known as "Bach's Lutheran Masses"
  - Chorale preludes BWV 669–677, also known as "Bach's Lutheran Mass"
