= Alexandra Kabalan =

Belgian-Lebanese philosopher (born 1980)

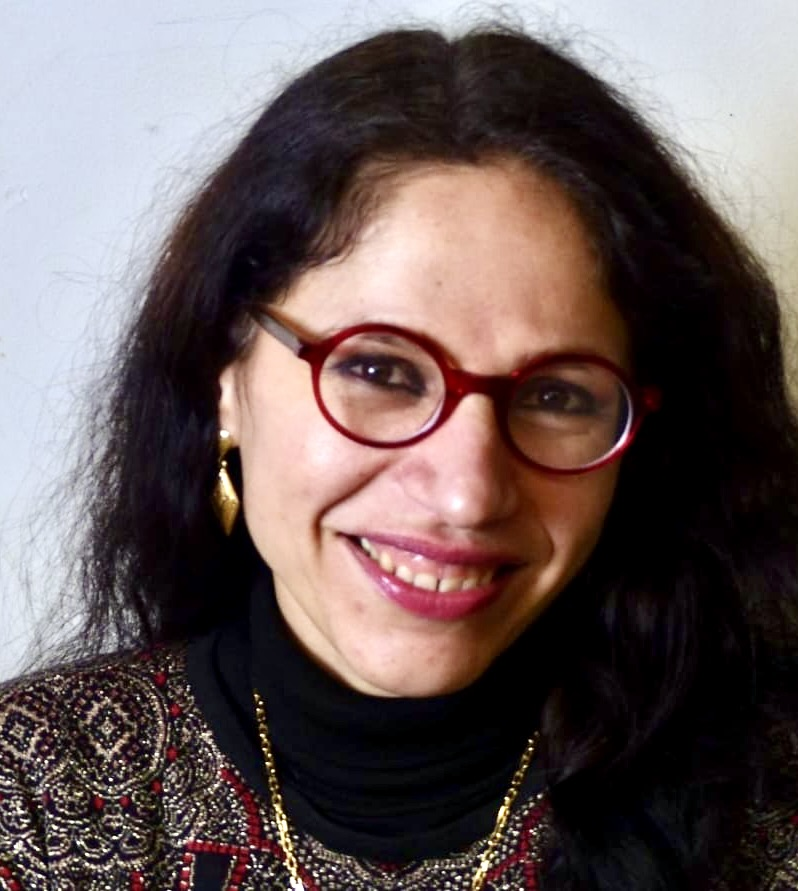
- Born: 18 August 1980; Ath, Hainaut, Belgium
- Citizenship: Belgian, Lebanese
- Education: Université Libre de Bruxelles, Conservatoire royal de Mons, Conservatoire royal de Bruxelles
- Occupations: Philosopher, lecturer, musician, visual artist
- Known for: Puppet-based visual art, choral conducting, organ performance, philosophy of art and artificial intelligence
- Style: Classical Music
- Website: tornacum.org

Alexandra Kabalan (born 18 August 1980 in Ath, Hainaut, Belgium) is a Belgian-Lebanese philosopher, lecturer, musician and visual artist.

Kabalan is recognized for her interdisciplinary work exploring links between identity, memory, narrative, visual art and music, as well as for public talks on the philosophical and ethical questions raised by art and technology, including artificial intelligence in music. An organist and choir conductor by training, she has developed an artistic and musical practice that brings together sensitivity and reflection, East and West, contemplation and transmission.

== Professional career ==
=== Musical studies ===
Kabalan is of dual heritage, with a Belgian mother and Lebanese father. This background drives a her work's reflections on plural identity. Her musical training began with piano training at the Académie de musique et des arts de la parole d'Enghien, where she received the Arenberg Medal. She went on to study chamber music at the Conservatoire de Tournai under Christiane Diricq, at the Conservatoire royal de Mons under Daniel Rubenstein, Nicolas Demetaille and Benoît Douchy, and through international workshops with André Siwy.

She subsequently studied the organ at the Académie de musique Saint-Grégoire in Tournai under Arnaud Van de Cauter and Momoyo Kokubu, and later in the class of Bernard Foccroulle at the Conservatoire royal de Bruxelles. With a particular interest in the French symphonic organ tradition, notably Marcel Dupré, she studied its technique and interpretation with Stéphane Detournay, a student of Rolande Falcinelli and director of the Académie de musique Saint-Grégoire.

=== Musician ===
Currently, Kabalan plays both organ and piano professionally, having played and also participated in several concerts in the Wallonia region.

Since 2022, Kabalan also directs the Royal Cercle Chorus Tornacum, a men's choir founded in Tournai in 1945. In March 2023, Kabalan participated alongside the Royal Cercle Chorus. In July 2026, Kabalan participated alongside the Royal Cercle Chorus in the Bread Mass at Mont Saint-Aubert.

=== Philosopher ===
A student of Belgian phenomenologist philosopher Marc Richir, Kabalan holds a teaching licence and a teaching-oriented Master's degree in philosophy from the Université libre de Bruxelles. She has contributed to publications and lectured on the relationship between art, music and philosophy, and on the phenomenology of artificial intelligence as applied to music; in February 2024 she spoke at the Séminaire épiscopal de Tournai on the impact of artificial intelligence on music.

=== Visual artist ===
Drawing on the work of Paul Ricœur, Kabalan's visual art explores the relationship between identity, memory and narrative, conceiving of the human being as a "being of narrative" who constructs a sense of self through storytelling. Informed by her Belgian-Lebanese heritage, her work engages with the traumas of the wars in Lebanon, Palestine and the wider Middle East through a poetic approach, including a body of symbolic puppet works aimed at children affected by war.

In 2026, she participated and contributed to the exhibition Intersection at the Maison des Employés in Mons, alongside Jean-Sébastien Wuilbaut and Philippe Jacquery. Also in 2026, she wrote and staged Reliquaires Kota du Gabon: cuivre, parole et souffle, a performance combining text and puppetry with music by Stéphane Detournay.

== Written works ==
As a research associate at the Université Libre de Bruxelles, Kabalan contributed to:

- Gilbert Hottois and Jean-Noël Missa (eds.), Nouvelle encyclopédie de bioéthique, Médecine, Environnement, Biotechnologie, De Boeck Université, 2001, ISBN 2-8041-3712-0.

== Bibliography ==
- Stéphane Detournay, "Alexandra Kabalan: Entre gestes et présence, la marionnette comme médiatrice", in Le Courrier de Saint-Grégoire, no. 135, 2025–26/VIII.

== Awards ==
- Arenberg Medal

== See also ==
- Université libre de Bruxelles
