= Uruñuela (disambiguation) =

Uruñuela is a village in La Rioja, Spain.

Uruñuela may also refer to:

- José Uruñuela (1891–1963), Spanish composer
- Luis Uruñuela (1937–2026), Spanish politician
  - Luis Uruñuela (Seville Metro), planned metro station
