= Francisco Ibáñez =

Francisco Ibañez may refer to:

- Francisco Ibáñez de Peralta (1644–1712), Spanish Royal Governor of Chile
- Francisco Ibáñez Talavera (1936–2023), Spanish comic book artist and writer
- Francisco Ibáñez (composer) (born 1950) Basque composer
- Francisco Ibáñez (footballer, born 1986), Chilean football forward
- Francisco Ibáñez (footballer, born 1998), Uruguayan football centre-back
