= Herr, deine Augen sehen nach dem Glauben, BWV 102 =

Church cantata by Johann Sebastian Bach

Herr, deine Augen sehen nach dem Glauben
- BWV 102
- Church cantata by Johann Sebastian Bach
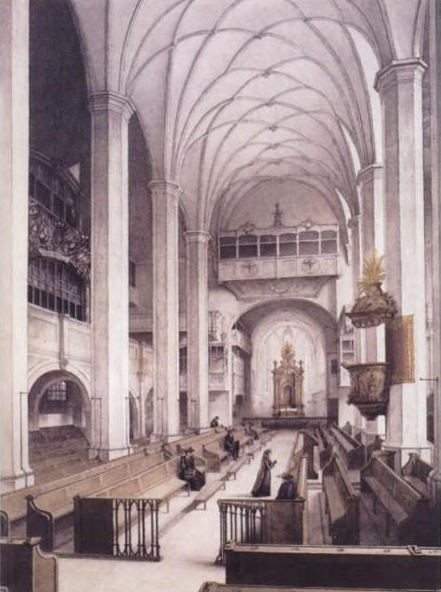
- Thomaskirche, Leipzig
- Related: Missa in G minor, BWV 235
- Occasion: Tenth Sunday after Trinity
- Bible text: Jeremiah 5:3; Romans 2:4–5
- Chorale: by Johann Heermann
- Performed: 25 August 1726: Leipzig
- Movements: seven, in two parts
- Vocal: SATB choir; solo: alto, tenor and bass
- Instrumental: flauto traverso; 2 oboes; 2 violins; viola; continuo

Johann Sebastian Bach composed the church cantata Herr, deine Augen sehen nach dem Glauben (Lord, Your eyes look for faith), BWV 102 in Leipzig for the tenth Sunday after Trinity and it was first performed on 25 August 1726.

== History and text ==
The cantata of Bach's third annual cycle in Leipzig was written for the Tenth Sunday after Trinity. The prescribed readings for the Sunday were from the First Epistle to the Corinthians, different gifts, but one spirit (1 Corinthians 12:1–11), and from the Gospel of Luke, Jesus announcing the destruction of Jerusalem and cleansing of the Temple (Luke 19:41–48). The words of the cantata are only generally connected to the readings, asking the soul to return immediately to God's ways. Two movements are based on Bible words, the opening chorus on Jeremiah 5:3, movement 4 on Romans 2:4–5. The cantata is closed by verses 6 and 7 of the hymn "So wahr ich lebe, spricht dein Gott" by Johann Heermann (1630), sung on the melody of Martin Luther's "Vater unser im Himmelreich" based on the Lord's Prayer. The words of the free poetry have been attributed to different authors: C. S. Terry suggests Christian Weiss Sr, Werner Neumann suggests Christiana Mariana von Ziegler, and Walther Blankenburg suggests Christoph Helm.

Bach first performed the cantata on 25 August 1726.

== Scoring and structure ==
The cantata is scored for alto, tenor and bass soloists and a four-part choir (SATB), flauto traverso, two oboes, two violins, viola, and basso continuo. The seven movements are structured in two parts, part two to be performed after the sermon.

1. Chorus: Herr, deine Augen sehen nach dem Glauben
2. Recitative (bass): Wo ist das Ebenbild, das Gott uns eingepräget
3. Aria (alto): Weh der Seele, die den Schaden nicht mehr kennt
4. Arioso (bass): Verachtest du den Reichtum seiner Gnade

Parte seconda

5. Aria (tenor): Erschrecke doch, du allzu sichre Seele
6. Recitative (alto): Beim Warten ist Gefahr
7. Chorale: Heut lebst du, heut bekehre dich

== Music ==
The opening chorus is a mature work containing an intricate combination of instrumental and vocal parts and a variety of expressive devices depicting the words. The opening sinfonia is in two parts which are repeated separately and together throughout the movement. The words Herr, deine Augen are repeated three times. Bach used the music for the Kyrie of his Missa in G minor.

Movements 3 and 5 are used in the Missa in F major. The bass voice in movement 4, marked arioso by Bach himself, is treated similarly to the vox Christi, the voice of Jesus in Bach's Passions and cantatas. The bass part has been recorded by singers who did not specialise in Baroque music, such as Dietrich Fischer-Dieskau with conductor Benjamin Britten at the Aldeburgh Festival. The final chorale uses the tune of Vater unser im Himmelreich.

== Recordings ==
- Britten at Aldeburgh (BBC) – Bach: Cantatas 102 & 151, Benjamin Britten, Aldeburgh Festival Singers, English Chamber Orchestra, Janet Baker, Peter Pears, Dietrich Fischer-Dieskau, Decca 1965
- Die Bach Kantate Vol. 47, Helmuth Rilling, Gächinger Kantorei, Bach-Collegium Stuttgart, Eva Randová, Kurt Equiluz, Wolfgang Schöne, Hänssler 1972
- Les Grandes Cantates de J. S. Bach Vol. 27, Fritz Werner, Heinrich-Schütz-Chor Heilbronn, Württembergisches Kammerorchester Heilbronn, Barbara Scherler, Theo Altmeyer, Bruce Abel, Erato 1973
- Bach Cantatas Vol. 4 – Sundays after Trinity I, Karl Richter, Münchener Bach-Chor, Münchener Bach-Orchester, Julia Hamari, Peter Schreier, Dietrich Fischer-Dieskau, Archiv Produktion 1977
- J. S. Bach: Das Kantatenwerk – Sacred Cantatas Vol. 6, Nikolaus Harnoncourt, Tölzer Knabenchor, Concentus Musicus Wien, Paul Esswood, Kurt Equiluz, Philippe Huttenlocher, Teldec 1980
- Bach Cantatas Vol. 5: Rendsburg/Braunschweig, John Eliot Gardiner, Monteverdi Choir, English Baroque Soloists, Daniel Taylor, Christoph Genz, Gotthold Schwarz, Soli Deo Gloria 2000
- J. S. Bach: Complete Cantatas Vol. 11, Ton Koopman, Amsterdam Baroque Orchestra & Choir, Bogna Bartosz, James Gilchrist, Klaus Mertens, Antoine Marchand 2002
- J. S. Bach: Cantatas for the Complete Liturgical Year Vol. 3, Sigiswald Kuijken, La Petite Bande, Petra Noskaiová, Christoph Genz, Jan van der Crabben, Accent 2003
- J. S. Bach: Cantatas Vol. 46, Masaaki Suzuki, Bach Collegium Japan, Robin Blaze, Gerd Türk, Peter Kooy, BIS 2009
- J. S. Bach Lutheran Masses, Vol. 1. Harry Christophers, The Sixteen, Coro 2013. This recording of the cantata is presented with the Masses in G minor, BWV 235, and F major, BWV 233.

== Sources ==
- Herr, deine Augen sehen nach dem Glauben, BWV 102: Scores at the International Music Score Library Project
- Herr, deine Augen sehen nach dem Glauben BWV 102; BC A 119 / Sacred cantata (10th Sunday after Trinity) Bach Digital
- Cantata BWV 102 Herr, deine Augen sehen nach dem Glauben! history, scoring, sources for text and music, translations to various languages, discography, discussion, Bach Cantatas Website
- BWV 102 Herr, deine Augen sehen nach dem Glauben English translation, University of Vermont
- BWV 102 Herr, deine Augen sehen nach dem Glauben text, scoring, University of Alberta
- Chapter 22 BWV 102 Herr, deine Augen sehen nach dem Glauben / Lord, Your eyes seek out true faith. Julian Mincham, 2010
- Gardiner, John Eliot (2008). Johann Sebastian Bach (1685-1750) / Cantatas Nos 45, 46, 101, 102, 136 & 178 (Cantatas Vol 5) (Media notes). Soli Deo Gloria (at Hyperion Records website).
- Luke Dahn: BWV 102.7 bach-chorales.com
