= Katharine Fuge =

English soprano

- Born: 1968 (age 56–57); Jersey
- Education: City, University of London; Guildhall School of Music and Drama
- Occupation: Classical soprano
- Organizations: Monteverdi Choir
- Website: www.katharinefuge.com

Katharine Fuge (born 1968) is an English soprano in concert and recital who is known for her work with John Eliot Gardiner's Bach Cantata Pilgrimage of 2000.

== Career ==
Fuge grew up on Jersey in the Channel Islands and studied in London at City, University of London and the Guildhall School of Music and Drama.

In 2000, she was part of John Eliot Gardiner's Bach Cantata Pilgrimage, both as a choir member of the Monteverdi Choir and as a soloist. In 2001 she performed Bach's St Matthew Passion with De Nederlandse Bachvereniging across Holland. She made her debut at The Proms and the Aldeburgh Festival in 2004, singing in Bach’s Mass in B minor. In 2005 she recorded Bach's Actus Tragicus with the Ricercar Consort conducted by Philippe Pierlot.

In 2008, she performed the solo in Bach's St John Passion in the Philharmonie Luxembourg, with Christoph Prégardien as the Evangelist, Andreas Pruys as the vox Christi, Robin Blaze, Peter Kooij, the choir Arsys Bourgogne and the Concerto Köln, conducted by Pierre Cao. Again with the Ricercar Consort, she recorded Bach's funeral music Trauerode and Missa in A, BWV 234, with one voice per part. She recorded the soprano solo of Ein deutsches Requiem by Brahms live in 2007 and 2008, in concerts at Usher Hall in Edinburgh, with baritone Matthew Brook, the Monteverdi Choir and the Orchestre Révolutionnaire et Romantique, conducted by Gardiner. A reviewer noted the delicacy and clarity of her sound, while another reviewer said that "the vulnerability of her tone ... does not seem out of place, considering what she is actually singing about".
