= Margrit Conrad =

Swiss singer (1918–2005)

- Born: 21 September 1918; Luzern, Switzerland
- Died: 2 August 2005 (aged 86); Baden, Switzerland
- Occupation: Classical contralto

Margrit Conrad (21 September 1918 – 2 August 2005) was a Swiss contralto in opera and concert.

Conrad was born in Lucerne. She studied at the conservatory of Zürich with Ria Ginster. She recorded Bach cantatas with Diethard Hellmann. She died in Baden, aged 86.
