= José María Franco (composer) =

Basque composer (1894–1971)

- Born: José María Franco Bordóns; 1894; Irun, Euskad, Spain
- Died: 1971 (aged 76–77)
- Occupation: Composer
- Known for: Músicos del '27

José María Franco Bordóns (born in Irun, Euskad, Spain, 1894–1971) was a Basque composer. He was one of the "músicos del '27".
