= Henri Ledroit =

French opera singer

Henri Ledroit (Villacourt, 1946 - Nancy, France, 1988) was a French counter-tenor, the first in France of the modern revival in that voice range. Originally training to be a baritone in 1972 he met Alfred Deller and decided to train as a countertenor. He made many of the earliest recordings of pieces later to become standards of baroque countertenor repertoire - for example his Orphée Descendant aux Enfers H 471 of Marc-Antoine Charpentier.

Ledroit died in 1988 at the age of 42 as a result of complications from AIDS.

== Select recordings ==
- Orphée descendant aux enfers (H.471), Stances du Cid (H.457, H.458, H.459), Tristes déserts (H.469), Ah! qu'on est malheureux (H.443), Amour vous avez beau redoubler mes alarmes (H.445), Rendez-moi mes plaisirs (H.463), Auprès du feu (H.446), Le bavolet (H.499 a), Epitaphium Carpentarii (H.474), of Marc-Antoine Charpentier. CD (Ricercar 1987).
- Six cantates profanes de Haendel, avec Noëlle Spieth, clavecin, et David Simpson, violoncelle, CD (Solstice 1983).
- Guillaume-Gabriel Nivers, Œuvres vocales et instrumentales, Louis Thiry, organ réalisé par le facteur Louis-Alexandre Clicquot en 1739 à l'église Saint-Jacques Saint-Christophe d'Houdan, CD (Solstice 1985).
- Miserere H.219, Pour la seconde fois que le Saint Sacrement vient au même reposoir H.372, Pour le Saint sacrement au reposoir H.346, Motet pour l'offertoire de la messe rouge H.434, de Marc-Antoine Charpentier. Chœur et orchestre de la Chapelle Royale, conducted by Philippe Herweghe. CD (Harmonia Mundi 1985).
- Messe de Minuit H.9, de Marc-Antoine Charpentier, La Grande Ecurie & la Chambre du Roy, conducted by Jean Claude Malgoire. (CBS Sony 1982).
- Motets de François Couperin, Ian Honeyman, Michèle Ledroit, René Schirrer, Jean-Charles Ablitzer, continuo. CD (Still 1984).
