= Johann Gottfried Olearius (1635–1711) =

German preacher, musician, and horticulturalist

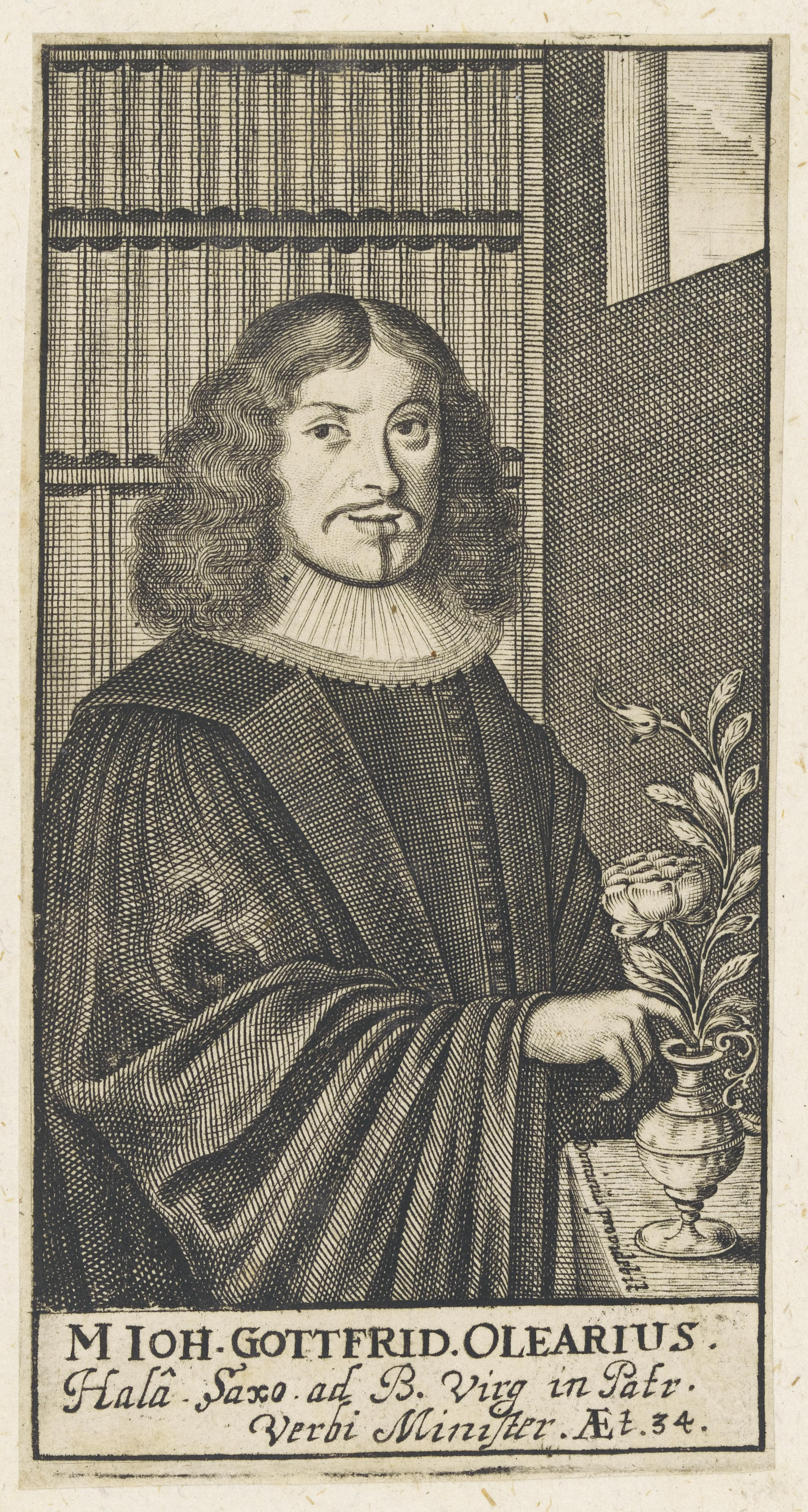
Johann Gottfried Olearius

Johann Gottfried Olearius (1635–1711) was a German preacher, musician and horticulturalist. (The name "Olearius" is the Latinised version of the German name Ölschläger.) He was the superintendent and pastor of the Barfüsserkirche (later the St. Paul's Church, Frankfurt am Main). He had been an accomplished church musician and supervised the young Johann Sebastian Bach when he was a church organist at Arnstadt from 1703 to 1707. Olearius also had an interest in horticulture, and the plant genus Olearia was named in his honour by Conrad Moench.

Johann Gottfried was a member of a large, extended family of pastors, theologians, professors and lawyers in Halle, Leipzig and Weissenfels. His younger brother was Johann Olearius.
