= La Capella Reial de Catalunya =

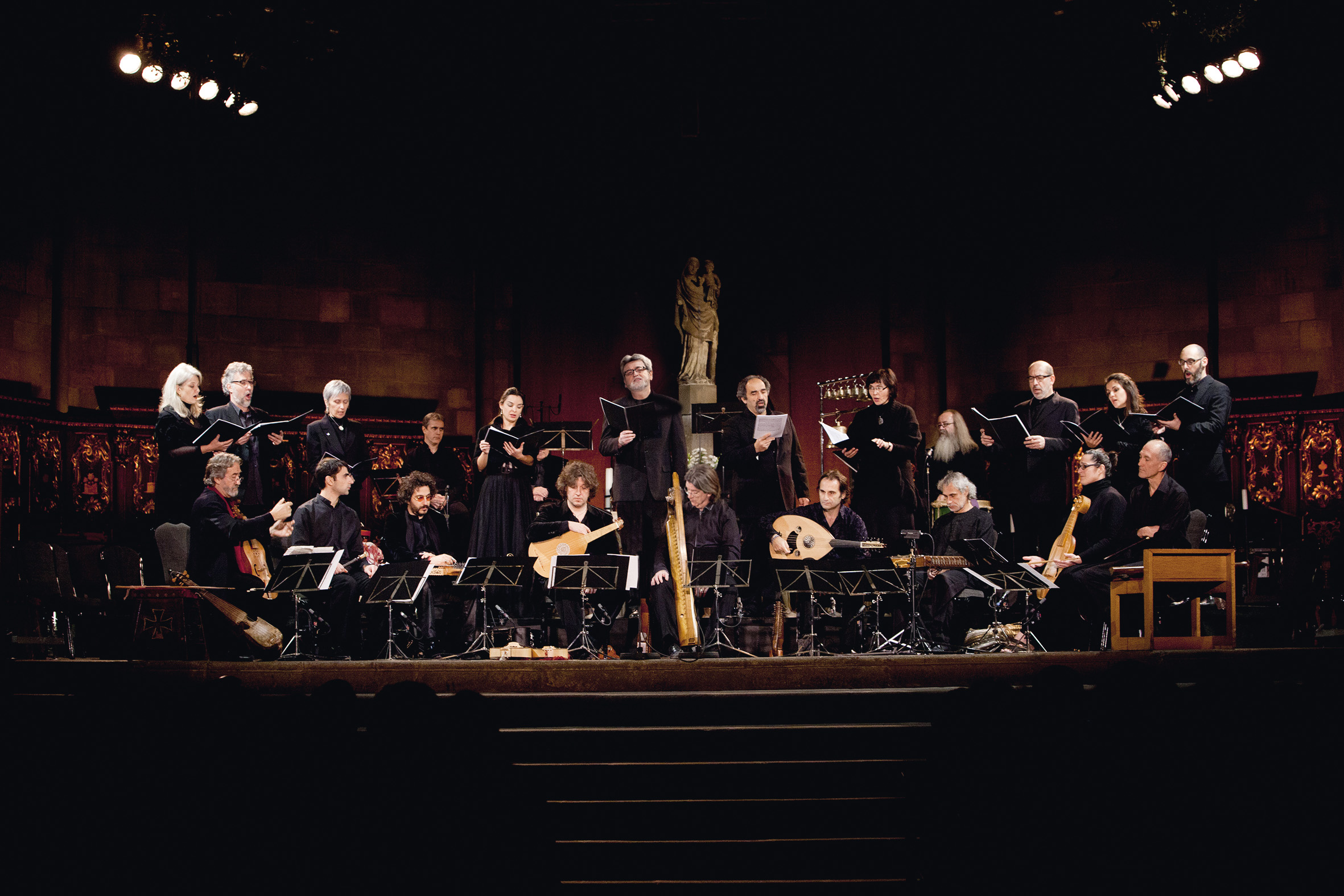
- La Capella Reial de Catalunya and Hespèrion XXI during the recording of "El Llibre Vermell de Montserrat"

Background information
- Genres: Catalan historical music
- Years active: 1987–

La Capella Reial de Catalunya is a group of soloist singers under the patronage of the Government of Catalonia with the aim of celebrating, maintaining, and reviving medieval vocal polyphony and the music of the Spanish Golden Age. The group was formed in Barcelona in 1987 by its conductor Jordi Savall. La Capella Reial de Catalunya often performs with Le Concert des Nations, a period instrument group also founded and conducted by Savall.
