= Gli Angeli Genève =

Baroque ensemble

- Baroque ensemble
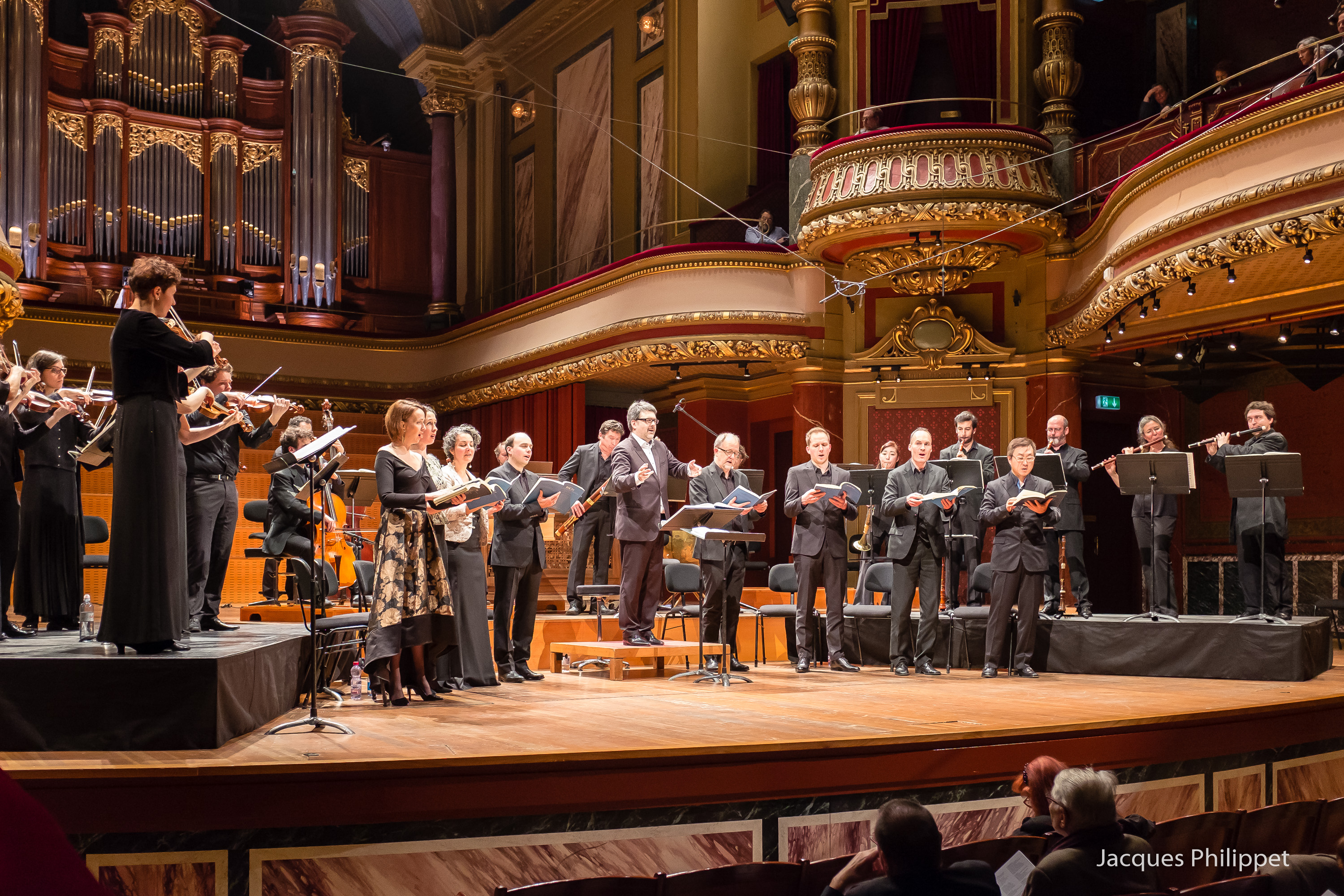
- Gli Angeli Genève at Geneva Victoria Hall in December 2016
- Founded: 2005
- Music director: Stephan MacLeod
- Website: www.gliangeligeneve.ch

Gli Angeli Genève is a Baroque ensemble based in Geneva, Switzerland. Founded in 2005 by the bass-baritone, Stephan MacLeod, their debut performance was at the Festival Amadeus de Meinier. The ensemble performs an annual season of four concerts in Geneva, primarily dedicated to Bach's cantatas and records for Sony Classical. Their debut album, German Baroque Cantatas Vol. 1 was the Gramophone "Editor's Choice" for November 2008. Their performance of Bach's St. Matthew Passion at the Victoria Hall in Geneva (1 March 2009) was broadcast by Radio Suisse Romande.

== Recordings ==
- German Baroque Cantatas Vol. 1 – Gli Angeli Genève; Stephan Macleod (conductor). Sony Classical (2008)
- German Baroque Cantatas Vol. 2 – Gli Angeli Genève; Stephan Macleod (conductor). Sony Classical (2009)

== Sources ==
- Freeman-Attwood, Jonathan, "Editor's Choice: German Baroque Cantatas Vol. 1", Gramophone, November 2008
- Lehnigk, Christiane, "Barock am Bass", Deutschlandradio, 8 June 2008
- Pulver, Jonas, Stephen Macleod, Bach en voix intégrale, Le Temps, 28 November 2009
- Radio Suisse Romande, "Chant libre", 22 March 2009
