= Le Concert des Nations =

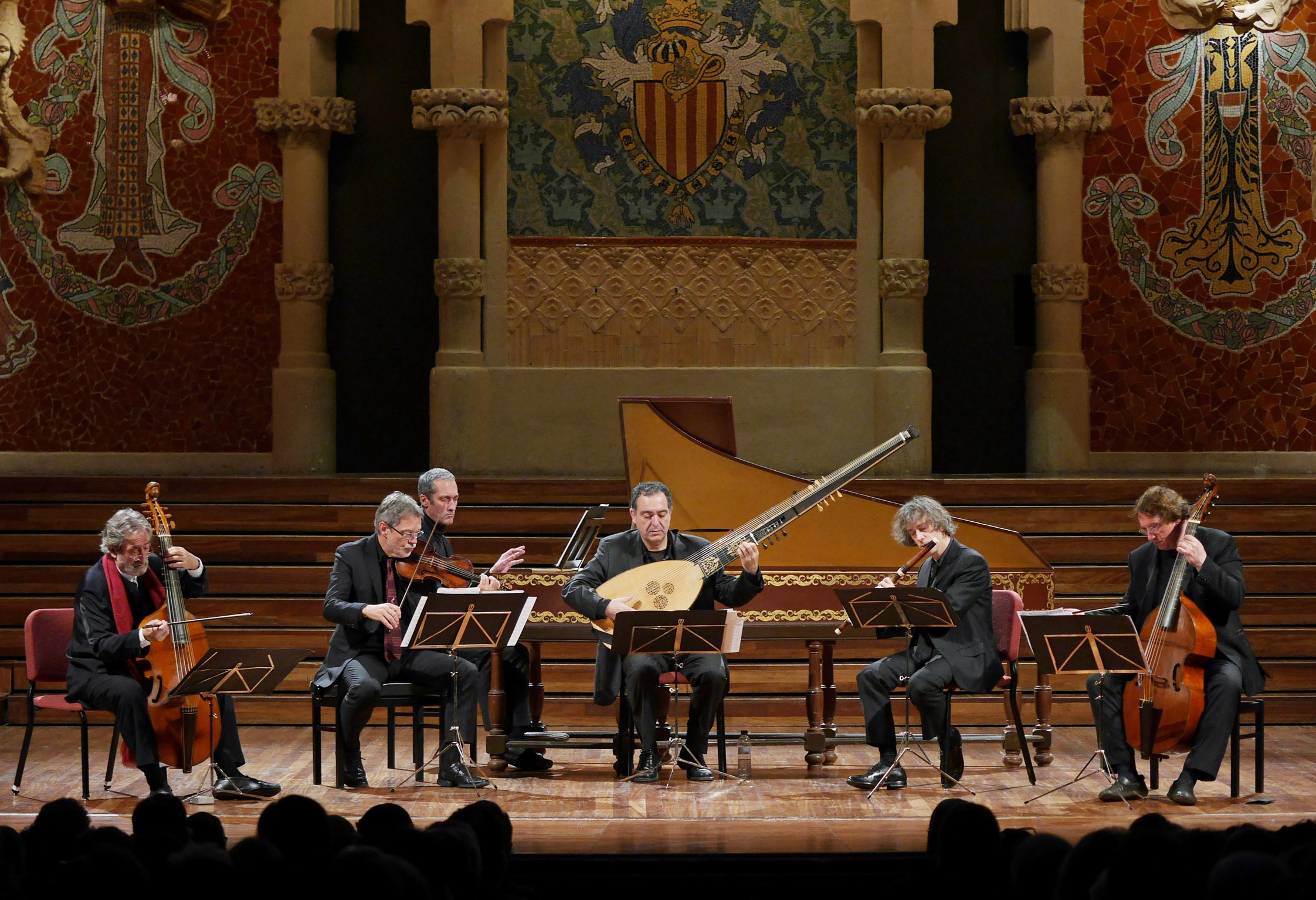
Le Concert des Nations at Palau de la Música Catalana

Le Concert des Nations is an orchestra using period instruments, which performs the orchestral and symphonic repertoire from the Baroque to Romanticism: 1600 - 1900. The orchestra was created in 1989, the youngest of the groups conducted by the Catalan maestro and viola da gamba virtuoso Jordi Savall. Le Concert des Nations is the first orchestra of its kind made up of musicians who originate mainly from Latin countries (Spain, South America, Italy, Portugal, France as well as many other countries). In 1992, Le Concert des Nations made its opera debut with Una Cosa Rara by Vicente Martín y Soler at the Théâtre des Champs-Élysées, Gran Teatre del Liceu, and the Auditorio Nacional. The name Le Concert des Nations refers to the work by François Couperin as an assembly of "tastes" and bears the mark of the Age of Enlightenment. Le Concert des Nations is the orchestra of La Capella Reial de Catalunya.
