= Johann Olearius (1611–1684) =

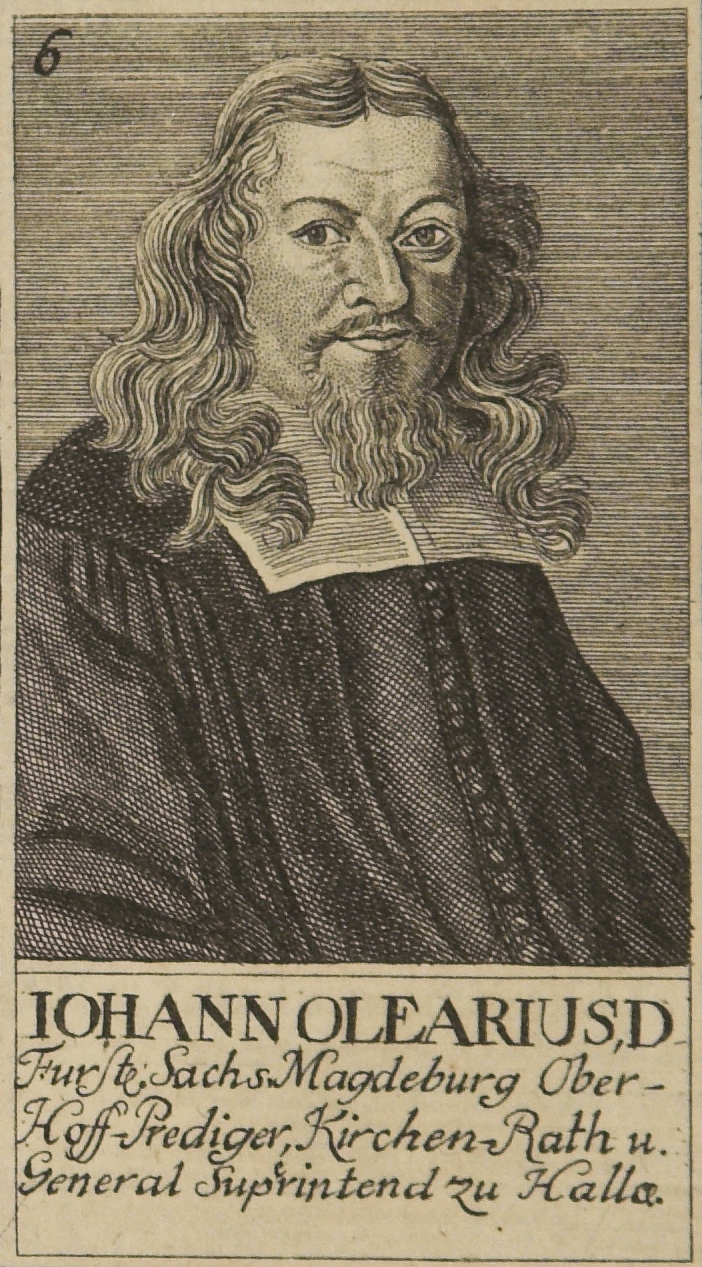
Johann Olearius

Johann Olearius (17 September 1611 – 24 April 1684) was a German hymnwriter, preacher, and academic.

Olearius taught philosophy at his alma mater, the University of Wittenberg. He also served as a court preacher and chaplain. He compiled "one of the largest and most important German hymnals" of the 1600s. His hymn "Gelobet sei der Herr, mein Gott" is the base for the chorale cantata Gelobet sei der Herr, mein Gott, BWV 129, by Johann Sebastian Bach, who also included a stanza of "Tröstet, tröstet meine Lieben" (Comfort, comfort ye my people) in his cantatas Freue dich, erlöste Schar, BWV 30.

Johann was a member of a large, extended family of pastors, theologians, professors and lawyers in Halle, Leipzig and Weissenfels. His elder brother was Johann Gottfried Olearius.
