= Hans Jörg Mammel =

German opera singer

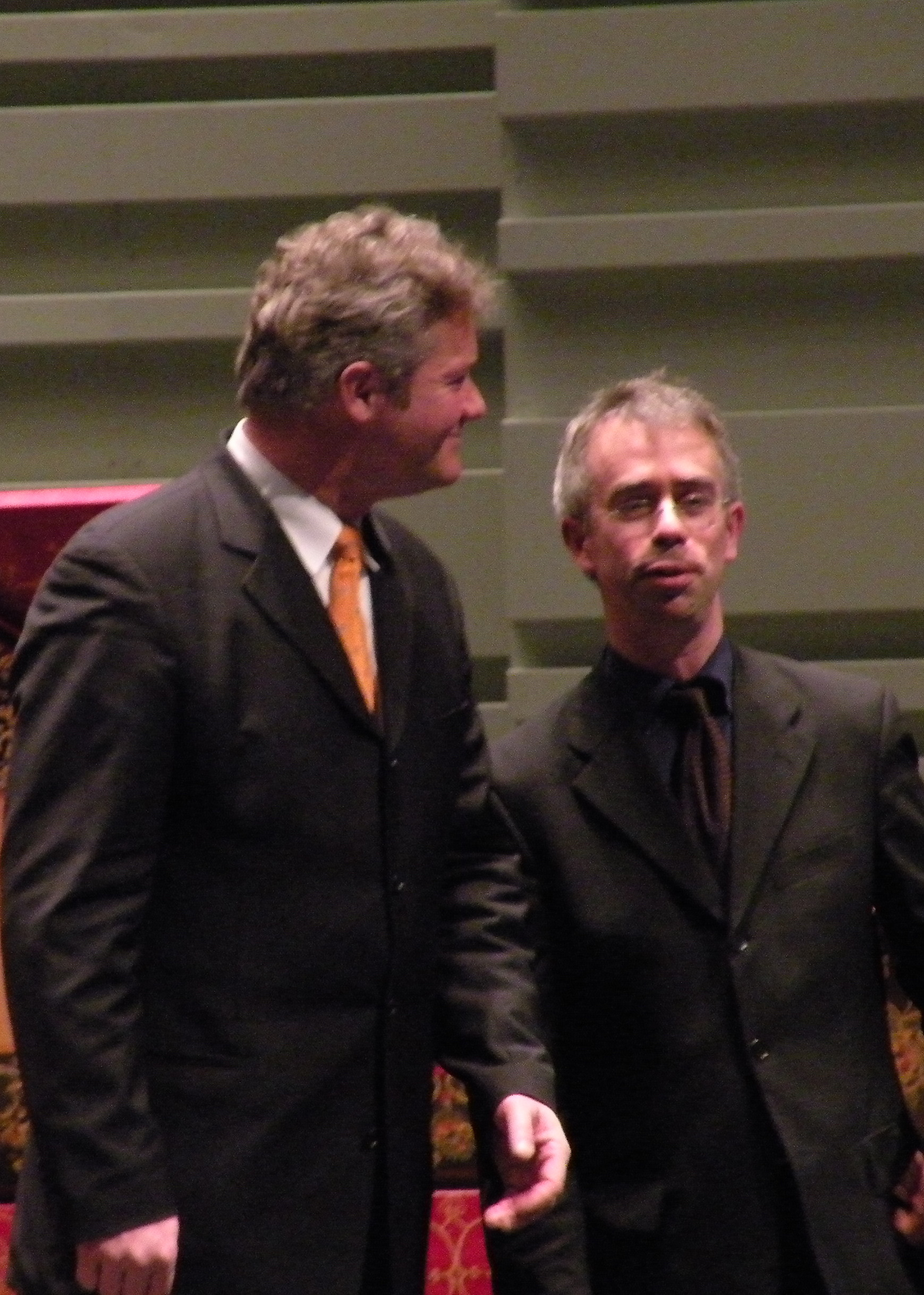
Mammel (left) and the French conductor Pierre Hantaï in 2009, during La Folle Journée in Nantes

Hans Jörg Mammel (born in Stuttgart) is a German tenor in opera and concert.

Mammel received his first musical training as a member of the boys' choir Stuttgarter Hymnus-Chorknaben. After aborting legal studies, he studied at the Hochschule für Musik Freiburg with Winfried Toll, Werner Hollweg and Ingeborg Most. After several master classes in Europe, Mammel collaborated with conductors such as Thomas Hengelbrock, Markus Teutschbein, Marcus Creed and Philippe Herreweghe. Mammel's repertoire includes major concert works and operas including song cycles and contemporary music. He has participated in premieres of works by Karlheinz Stockhausen.

Mammel sang among others the title role of Monteverdi's L'Orfeo in Iceland. He was a guest artist at the Theater Freiburg, the Theater Koblenz and the Staatsoper Unter den Linden in Berlin. In 2008 Mammel performed the title role in Mozart's La clemenza di Tito at the Opéra de Normandie in Rouen.
