= José Uruñuela =

Spanish composer (1891–1963)

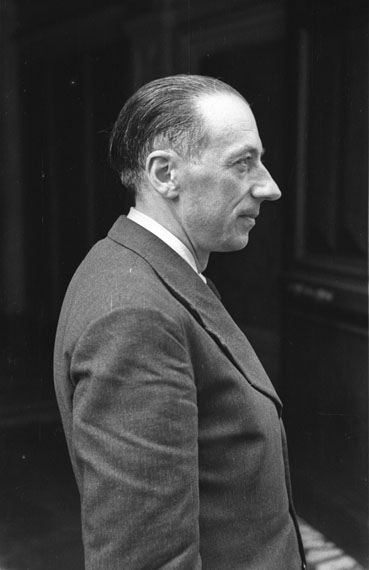
José Uruñuela

José Tomas Uruñuela (28 July 1891, Gasteiz – 3 July 1963, San Sebastián) was a Basque composer. He was also a master of danza alavés.
