= Thomas Selle =

German composer (1599–1663)

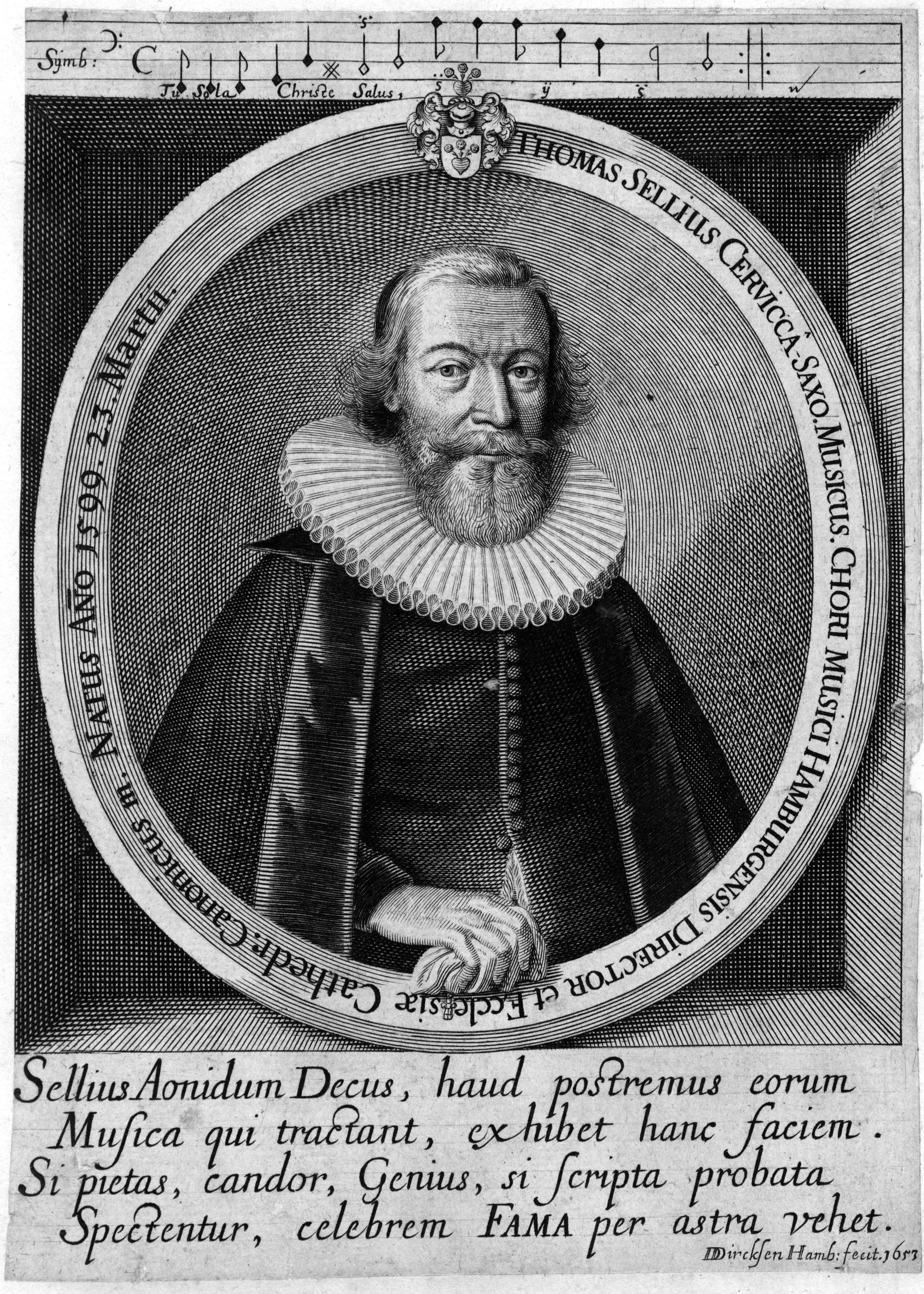
Thomas Selle

Thomas Selle (23 March 1599 – 2 July 1663) was a German baroque composer.

== Life ==
There is practically no reliable information about the early years of Thomas Selle. Between his birth in 1599 in Zörbig and his matriculation in the University of Leipzig in 1622, there is no documentary evidence of his activities. However, considering his claim from around 1643 in the Kurtze doch gründliche anleitung zur Singekunst (A brief but thorough introduction to the art of singing) of "having been motivated by the late Mr. Seth Calvisius" (aus antrieb des sel[igen] H[errn] Sethi Calvisij) in applying himself to the art of chanting, he is assumed to be an alumnus of the St. Thomas School, Leipzig, where he would have been student of Sethus Calvisius and perhaps also Johann Hermann Schein.

By 1624 he was a teacher at the Latin school of Heide, and only a year after he becomes a headmaster in Wesselburen (both Schleswig-Holstein). In his time in Wesselburen he married Anna Weihe, the daughter of a bourgeois family from Husum, and prepared most of his secular songs to appear in print.

In 1634 Selle and his wife resettled in Itzehoe, where Selle took on the duties as cantor with the title of director chori musici Itzehoensis. This office entailed high social esteem. As well as making his mark as the poet of his own lyrics, by publishing numerous print collections of sacred and secular music, he also gained recognition as a composer. Furthermore, in these years he met the librettist Johann Rist, who became a close friend of Selle, whose high reputation had spread significantly. In 1641 the vacant position of cantor at the Johanneum Gymnasium in Hamburg was given to him "with unanimous decision and without previous application" (einstimmig und ohne vorangegangene Bewerbung). He also mastered the subsequent audition and thereby obtained a post in Hamburg, that he may have had aimed for some time. That Selle printed all his works in Hamburg and dedicated several to influential merchants of the city, point to this conclusion.

His position as cantor of the Johanneum was a uniquely desirable one. Hamburg had survived the destruction of the Thirty Years' War relatively unscathed and had an increasingly strategic position as a port, and, as a result of foreign trade, also a lively cultural exchange. The city was developing into a prosperous and culturally and politically significant metropolis. Selle had correspondingly abundant musical resources at hand for furnishing both the major and minor Protestant churches – and from 1642 on also the catholic cathedral – with his music. Not only was he responsible for providing music for the services, but also for the city's luxurious festivities. From these occasions, ceremonious compositions such as the Vivat Hamburgum emerged, that demonstrate the potential of his music as a device for representation.

Taking into account the tastes of the affluent residents of Hamburg, Selle sought to provide the highest quality of music. In his writing Verzeichnis von Adjuvanten, welche zur Musik der Cantor zu Hamburg alle Sonntage höchst vonnöten hat (List of adjuvants, whom the Cantor of Hamburg all Sundays dearly is in need of for the music) to the city council, he demanded the employment of additional professional musicians. His approved demands of a minimum of 20 instrumentalists and the equipment of all churches with organ positives and regals lead an increased capacity for the performance of his large compositions in numerous venues with "eight singers, eleven choir-instrumentslists and eight council musicians" (von acht Sängern, elf Chorinstrumentalisten und acht Ratsmusikanten). The success of his negotiations induced him to rearranging his pre-Hamburg music to the newly established large-scale possibilities. In this way, Selle brought about a reorganization of the Protestant church music in Hamburg.

Selle's duties also included music lessons for the higher classes of the Johanneum. He delegated his duties of Latin instruction (as one of the first cantors who did this, though this later became standard practice) and was thus able to fully concentrate on the instruction of music. This creates the context of the treatise Anleitung zur Singekunst, which contains large passages on sight-singing.

Die praktische Ausrichtung und der Verzicht auf etablierte Modelle zeigen Selle als Neuerer und Verfechter eines modernen Musikverständnisses, das sich immer weniger an den modalen Ordnungsmustern orientierte. Der Traktat zeugt außerdem von Selles Ambitionen in Bezug auf die Fähigkeit seiner Sänger.	The practical orientation and the renunciation of established models show Selle as both reformer and advocate of a new understanding of music, which successively ceased to adapt to modal principles of order. The treatise also shows Selle's ambition with regard to the ability of his singers.

Just before Selle's death in 1663, he left his entire estate to the Hamburg Municipal Library, which contains his 281 works in the collection of his Opera omnia.

== Opera omnia ==
In the Opera omnia, Selle not only compiled the sacred compositions of his Hamburg time, but also inserted most of those previously published. In the preface of the anthology, Selle addressed the Benevolo Musico (the music-lover). Not included in the collection are secular and solely instrumental compositions. Nonetheless, for his sacred vocal music, the handwritten source corpus has a salient importance, for Selle published after his change to Hamburg in 1641 only one more collection of 10 works in 1646, the Concertuum Latino-Sacrorum (this is incidentally also the only work not published in Hamburg, but rather in Rostock). It seems reasonable to suppose that Selle had planned to publish his collected works early on when taking on the position in Hamburg. The last, corrected entry of the anthology, that he now had to leave to the Hamburg Municipal Library in handwritten form, dates from 23 March 1663 (symbolically Selle's birthday) and entails a signature, commented with scribebat propriâ manû [written in his own hand], providing a strong case for authorship and authenticity.

This addition is by no means unjustified. In the 16 volumes constituting the original anthology (during the restoration in 1964/65 the parts of the four histories were bound separately, thus today 20 volumes of parts exist) 281 works were written by numerous, not yet identified hands, likely Selle's pupils. These parts are a fair copy of the probably lost performance materials of the period. These parts, Selle had again transcribed into a fair copy in the German organ tablature notation, which therefore constitutes the hierarchically superior main source of the 281 works. This is further evidenced by the attachment of the preface to the first tablature volume, rather than the score.

Selle divided the Opera omnia into seven books; four contain Latin and three German works, though they vary considerably in their scope.

1. L1.01–L1.11
2. L2.01–L2.15
3. L3.01–L3.30
4. L4.01–L4.33+1
5. D1.01–D1.52
6. D2.01–D2.61
7. D3.01–D3.74

The first book of Latin works (L1), is apart from one piece identical to the only print of Selle's Hamburg period (the Concertuum Latino-Sacrorum of 1646), which confirms the assumption of the composer having planned a systematic publication of his collected works early on. In addition, the manuscript version of the Liber primus must be significantly older than the other parts, since it is the only section of the Opera omnia in Selle's own hand – apart from corrections, indices and the preface. The seven books themselves are roughly divided generically, e.g. in the Liber tertius (which contains exclusively pre-published pieces from prints dating from 1630, 1633 and 1635) one finds the largest-scale Latin compositions. Here Selle inserted colossal ritornellos in alternatim, polychoral writing into those pre-existing, quite complex concertos with just few voices in order to create strong dynamic contrast. Cantus firmus solo pieces as well as pieces in the motet style mostly make up the Liber quartus. The Erste Theil Teutscher Geistlicher Concerten, Madrigalien und Motetten [first part of German, sacred concertos, madrigals and motets] is, as the title already gives away, quite heterogeneous, though it only contains music from Selle's Hamburg period, including the pioneering (gospel-) dialogues. As for the 74 mostly choral settings of the third and largest book of German concertos, they are predominantly "partly luxurious polychoral concertos, handling the repertoire of protestant hymns that had been accumulated over a century".

Finally, the significance of the four histories should be mentioned, which also belong to the Opera omnia, but because they do not exist in a tablature version, in 1964/65 were bound separately: the Mattäuspassion, the Johannespassion (with and without intermedia) and the Auferstehungshistorie (Resurrection History). A rapid development in the adaptation of modern musical setting is manifest in the two Passions, which according to the dating of the title pages were written in 1642 and 1643. Pöche illustrates this as follows:

Im 16. Jahrhundert und noch bis hin zu Selles Kompositionen gibt es im Groben zwei verschiedene Formen von Passionsvertonungen: die responsoriale Passion, bei der die Passionsgeschichte auf den Passionstönen psalmodierend vorgetragen wird, und die motettische oder durchkomponierte Passion, die den Passionstext durchgängig vokal-polyphon vertont. Selle übernimmt für seine Matthäuspassion zwar den Passionston aus der responsorialen Matthäuspassion von Heinrich Grimm, die wiederum auf die erste deutschsprachige responsoriale Passion von Johann Walter zurückgeht, doch das äußere Gewand seiner Vertonung ändert sich grundlegend. Erstmals in der Geschichte der Passionsvertonung setzt Selle in der Matthäuspassion den neuen Generalbass ein.	In the 16th century and right up to Selle's compositions, there are roughly two different models of Passion setting: the responsorial Passion, in which the gospel is recited on the Passion tones in a psalmody manner, and the motet-like or through-composed Passion, which sets the Passion text consistently polyphonically to music. For his St. Matthew Passion, Selle admittedly adopts the passion tone from the responsorial St. Matthew Passion by Heinrich Grimm, which in turn goes back to the first German-language responsorial Passion by Johann Walter; the outer garment of his setting, however, changes fundamentally. For the first time in the history of Passion setting, Selle uses the new figured bass in the St. Matthew Passion.

The novelty of Selle's St. Matthew Passion is not only to be found in the figured bass, but also the stronger musical characterization of the acting figures through the differentiated, accompanying instruments such as violins for the role of Jesus or lower violas for the evangelist. The characterization occurs even more extensively in the St. John Passion through a semantically specific instrumental accompaniment (such as the assignment of the pastorally connoted flutes to the role of Peter, the shepherd of Christianity, or 'lordly' horns to Pilate). Furthermore, the St. John Passion leaves behind the setting along Passion tones, and instead adapts the modern recitative style of Italian music.

Als drittes Kriterium für die musikhistorische Relevanz besonders der 'großen' Johannespassion gilt die feste Einfügung von Intermedien (Einschübe in den Passionsbericht mit Texten anderer Herkunft), wodurch dieses Werk in der Sekundärliteratur häufig zum ersten Beispiel einer sogenannten oratorischen Passion avanciert.	The third criterion for the music-historical relevance, especially of the 'great' St. John Passion, is the fixed insertion of intermedia (insertions in the Passion report with texts from different origins), whereby this work in secondary literature often advanced to the first example of a so-called oratorical passion.

With the smaller dialogues found in D1 and D2 of the Opera omnia, Selle has "large ... parts of the gospel, from the birth of Christ (D1.43) via stations in his Life – parables and miracles –, the entry into Jerusalem (D1.40), the Last Supper (D2.02) up to the Passion (St. Matthew and St. John Passion) and Resurrection (both resurrection histories)" set to music for the Hamburg churches.

The fact that Selle is almost completely unknown today as a composer runs counter to the significance of his office and the musical conceptual influence he had (especially in the field of dialogues and histories) on later generations. It is probably mainly due to the record-type of his Opera omnia. The handwritten main source of the 281 works recorded in German organ tablature made it much more difficult to perform his works in later centuries than would have been the case with printed scores. This explains why the extensive corpus of sources was only catalogued in the early 1990s. This happened in the course of many other surveys of music manuscripts from the Hamburg State Library, which had originally been evacuated during the Second World War, then transported as loot to the Soviet Union and gradually returned after the fall of the Iron Curtain after 1990. Thus only in 1999, for the 400th birthday of the composer, a first anthology could appear. Since 2015 the DFG-funded research projects at the University of Hamburg is the prime mover in making the composer accessible again to a wider public through the digital critical edition of the Opera omnia.

== Editions ==
- 6 geistliche Konzerte, A. Egidi (ed.), Berlin 1929
- Passion nach dem Evangelisten Johannes mit Intermedien, R. Gerber (ed.), Wolfenbüttel 1933
