= Francisco Ibáñez (composer) =

Basque composer

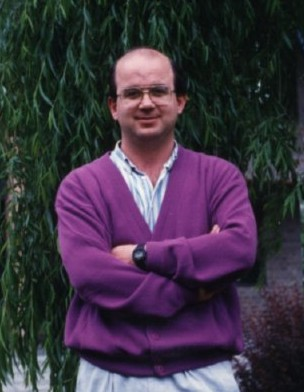
Francisco Ibáñez

Francisco Ibáñez Irribarría (Oyón, Alava, 1951) is a Basque composer. He studied in Barcelona with Carles Guinovart.
