= Kyrie–Gloria Masses, BWV 233–236 =

4 masses by Johann Sebastian Bach

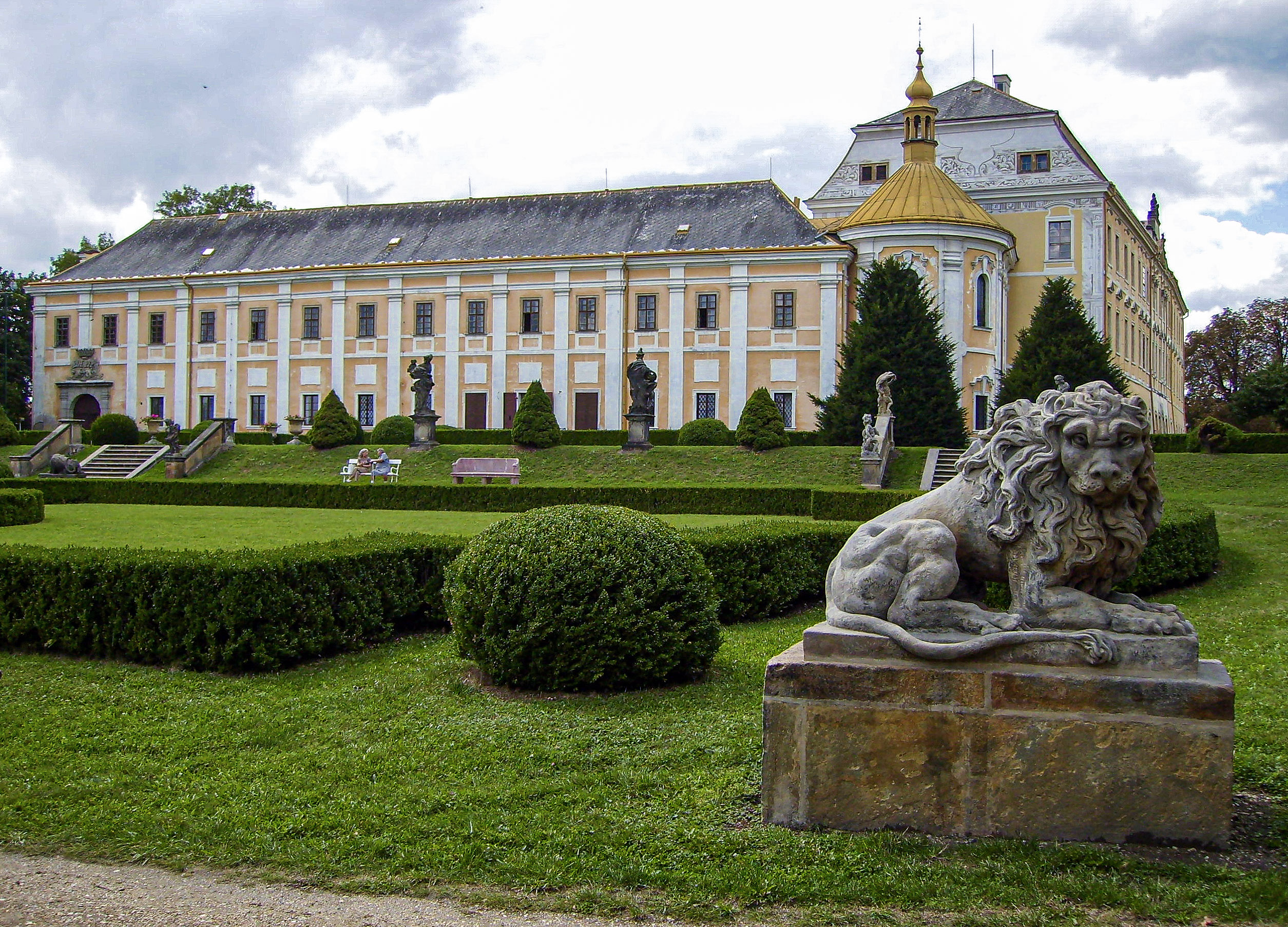
Lysa castle, possibly the location of performances of BWV 233 to 236

Apart from the 1733 Mass for the Dresden court (later incorporated in the Mass in B minor), Johann Sebastian Bach wrote four further Kyrie–Gloria Masses, BWV 233–236. These compositions, consisting of the first two sections of the Mass ordinary (i.e. the Kyrie and the Gloria), have been indicated as Missae breves (Latin for "short masses") or Lutheran Masses.

They seem to have been intended for liturgical use, considering a performance time of about 20 minutes each, the average duration of a Bach cantata. They may have been composed around 1738/39. Possibly they were written for Count Franz Anton von Sporck or performed by him in Lysá (German: Lissa).

Each of the Kyrie-Gloria Masses is in six movements: the Kyrie is one choral movement (with Kyrie/Christe/Kyrie subdivisions) and the Gloria is in five movements. The first and last movement of the Gloria are also choral, framing three arias for different voice types. The music consists mostly of parodies of earlier cantata movements. Bach changed the music slightly to adjust to the Latin words, but kept the original instrumentation. For instance, the opening chorus of Es wartet alles auf dich, BWV 187, became the final movement of the Missa in G minor, Cum sancto spiritu. Occasionally he switched a voice part, for example he asked for a tenor in the Qui tollis of that Missa, a parody of the soprano aria Gott versorget alles Leben of that cantata.

== Compositions ==
=== Kyrie–Gloria Mass in F major, BWV 233 ===
For the Missa in F major, BWV 233, scored for horns, oboes, bassoon, strings, SATB, and basso continuo, Bach derived most of the six movements from earlier cantatas as parodies. The first movement derives from Kyrie "Christe, du Lamm Gottes" in F major, BWV 233a, which may have been performed for the first time on Good Friday, 6 April 1708.

No.	Title	Voice	Base
1	Kyrie eleison – Christe eleison – Kyrie eleison	Chorus	BWV 233a
2	Gloria in excelsis	Chorus	
3	Domine Deus	Bass	possibly BWV Anh. 18/6
4	Qui tollis	Soprano	BWV 102/3
5	Quoniam	Alto	BWV 102/5
6	Cum sancto Spiritu	Chorus	BWV 40/1

=== Kyrie–Gloria Mass in A major, BWV 234 ===
For the Missa in A major, BWV 234, scored for flute, strings, SATB, and basso continuo, Bach parodied music from at least four earlier cantatas.

No.	Title	Voice	Base
1	Kyrie eleison – Christe eleison – Kyrie eleison	Chorus	
2	Gloria in excelsis	Chorus	BWV 67/6
3	Domine Deus	Bass	
4	Qui tollis	Soprano	BWV 179/5
5	Quoniam	Alto	BWV 79/2
6	Cum sancto Spiritu	Chorus	Vivace part: BWV 136/1

=== Kyrie–Gloria Mass in G minor, BWV 235 ===
For the Missa in G minor, BWV 235, scored for oboes, strings, SATB, basso continuo, Bach derived all six movements from cantatas as parodies.

No.	Title	Voice	Base
1	Kyrie eleison – Christe eleison – Kyrie eleison	Chorus	BWV 102/1
2	Gloria in excelsis	Chorus	BWV 72/1
3	Gratias	Bass	BWV 187/4
4	Domine Fili	Alto	BWV 187/3
5	Qui tollis – Quoniam	Tenor	BWV 187/5
6	Cum sancto Spiritu	Chorus	BWV 187/1

=== Kyrie–Gloria Mass in G major, BWV 236 ===
For the Missa in G major, BWV 236, scored for oboes, strings, SATB, basso continuo, Bach derived all six movements from cantatas as parodies.

No.	Title	Voice	Base
1	Kyrie eleison – Christe eleison – Kyrie eleison	Chorus	BWV 179/1
2	Gloria in excelsis	Chorus	BWV 79/1
3	Gratias	Bass	BWV 138/5
4	Domine Deus	Soprano, alto	BWV 79/5
5	Quoniam	Tenor	BWV 179/3
6	Cum sancto Spiritu	Chorus	BWV 17/1

== Reception ==
In 1818 the Missa in A major, BWV 234, was one of a very few of Bach's compositions for voices and orchestra to appear in print prior to the Bach Gesellschaft complete edition in the second half of the 19th century.

== Discography ==
- J.S. Bach: Missae Breves, Hans Grischkat, Schwäbischer Singkreis Stuttgart, Ton-Studio Orchestra Stuttgart, Agnes Giebel, Lotte Wolf-Matthäus, Werner Hohmann, Franz Kelch, Renaissance / Baroque Music Club early 1950s?
- J.S. Bach: Masses, Helmuth Rilling, Gächinger Kantorei, Bach-Collegium Stuttgart, Elisabeth Speiser, Ingeborg Ruß, John van Kesteren, Gerhard Faulstich, Jakob Stämpfli, Intercord 1967
- J.S. Bach: Missae Breves, Kurt Redel, Helmut Winschermann, Agnes Giebel, Gisela Litz, Hermann Prey, Elly Ameling, Birgit Finnilä, Theo Altmeyer, William Reimer, Philips 1965, 1970
- Bach: Messen BWV 233-236, Martin Flämig, Dresdner Kreuzchor, Dresdner Philharmonie, Renate Krahmer, Annelies Burmeister, Peter Schreier, Theo Adam, Eterna 1972 — re-issued Brilliant Classics 99361/3 and 4
- The Great Choral Masterpieces, Peter Schreier, RIAS Kammerchor, Kammerorchester Carl Philipp Emanuel Bach, Barbara Bonney, Birgit Remmert, Rainer Trost, Olaf Bär, Philips 1991
- J.S. Bach: Missae Breves BWV 233-236, Patrick Peire, Capella Brugensis, Collegium Instrumentale Brugense, Greta De Reyghere, Wilke te Brummelstroete, James Gilchrist, Jan van der Crabben, Eufoda 2000
- J.S. Bach: Complete Cantatas Vol. 22, Ton Koopman, Amsterdam Baroque Orchestra & Choir, Johannette Zomer, Bogna Bartosz, Jörg Dürmüller, Klaus Mertens, Antoine Marchand 2005
- Bach: Lutheran Masses, BWV 233-236, Thomas Folan, Publick Musick, Anne Harley, Andrea Folan, Miranda Loud, Pablo Bustos, Max van Egmond, Eufoda 2005
- Bach: Masses, BWV 233-236 & Sanctus, BWV 238, Philippe Herreweghe & Collegium Vocale Gent, EMI Records Ltd/Virgin Classics 2010
