= François Fernandez =

French classical violinist

François Fernandez (born 22 February 1960) is a French classical violinist who specializes in historically informed performance.

== Career ==
Born in Rouen in a family of musicians, Fernandez began learning the classical violin at the age of twelve, then the baroque violin, two years later, and finally devoted himself solely to the baroque instrument, undertaking a parallel study with Sigiswald Kuijken. At the age of seventeen, he played with the Kuijken brothers' La Petite Bande and, in 1978, obtained his soloist's diploma.

He then played with other Baroque ensembles as a soloist, notably with the Kuijken Quartet, La Chapelle Royale, the Orchestra of the Eighteenth Century, Les Agrémens, the Ensemble 415, Melante 81, the Ricercar Consort, the Baroque orchestra Les Muffatti and the Bremer Barockorchester. For several years, he has devoted himself to chamber music with the Kuijken brothers, the Ricercar Consort and the Hantai brothers.

Besides the baroque violin, Fernandez plays the viola, the viola d'amore, the viol and the cello da spalla. He has taught at the conservatories of Toulouse, Liège, Brussels and Trossingen. Since 1998, he has been teaching the baroque violin at the Conservatoire de Paris. He regularly gives masterclasses in Belgium and Spain.

In collaboration with other musicians, Philippe Pierlot and Rainer Zipperling (1955-), he founded the record label "Flora" in 1991.

== See also ==
- Sigiswald Kuijken
- Wieland Kuijken
