= Philippe Pierlot =

Belgian viola da gamba player and conductor

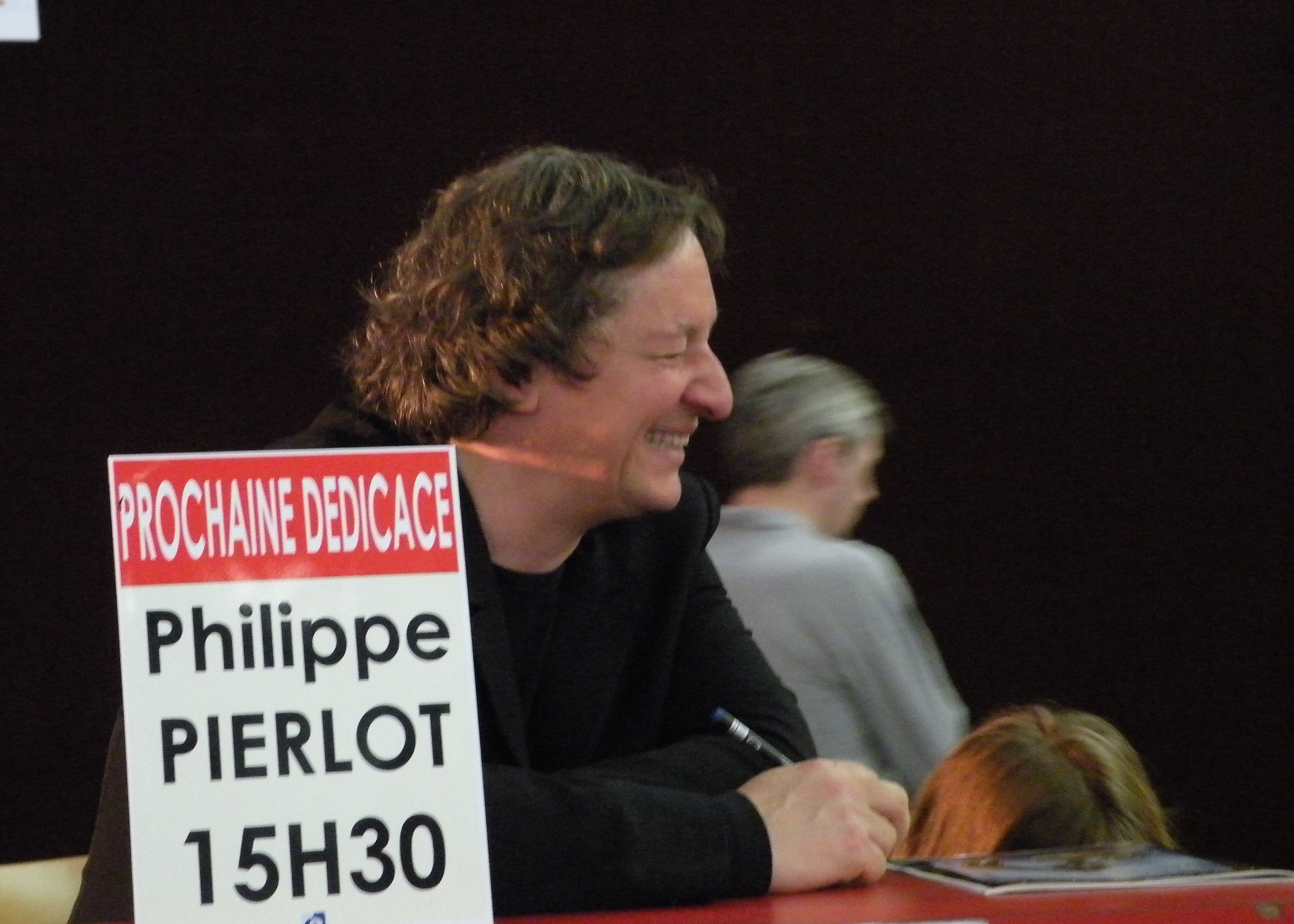
- At La Folle Journée in 2009
- Born: 1958 (age 67–68); Liège, Belgium
- Occupations: Viola da gamba player; Conductor; Academic teacher
- Organizations: Ricercar Consort; Royal Conservatory of The Hague; Royal Conservatory of Brussels

Philippe Pierlot (pronounced [filip pjɛʁlo]; born 1958) is a Belgian viola da gamba player and a conductor in historically informed performance. He is also an academic teacher at the royal conservatories of The Hague and Brussels.

== Career ==
Born in Liège, Pierlot learned to play the recorder, the guitar and the lute at the age of twelve. He studied playing the viola da gamba with Wieland Kuijken. In 1980, he founded the ensemble Ricercar Consort, with the violinist François Fernandez and the keyboard player Bernard Foccroulle, focusing on the performance and recording of little-known music in historically informed performance.

Several contemporary compositions were dedicated to him. He also plays the baryton, for which Joseph Haydn composed around 150 works. In 1999, he revived Marais's opera Sémélé, which had not been performed for 300 years, after composing some missing parts.

Until 2006, Pierlot was professor for viola da gamba at the Hochschule für Musik Trossingen. He has been a teacher at the Royal Conservatory of The Hague and the Royal Conservatory of Brussels.

== Recording ==
Pierlot led series of recordings such as Deutsche Barockmusik and Deutsche Barockkantaten, recorded the vocal works by Nicolaus Bruhns, the complete works by Matthias Weckmann and the works for viola da gamba by Marin Marais. His recording of three Christmas cantatas by Bach, in an approach with one voice on a part, was commented by a critic: "Pierlot conducts all three cantatas with a beat that pulses with life, and his speeds are judged just right – neither too fast nor too slow."
