= Bernard Foccroulle =

Belgian organist, composer, conductor and opera director

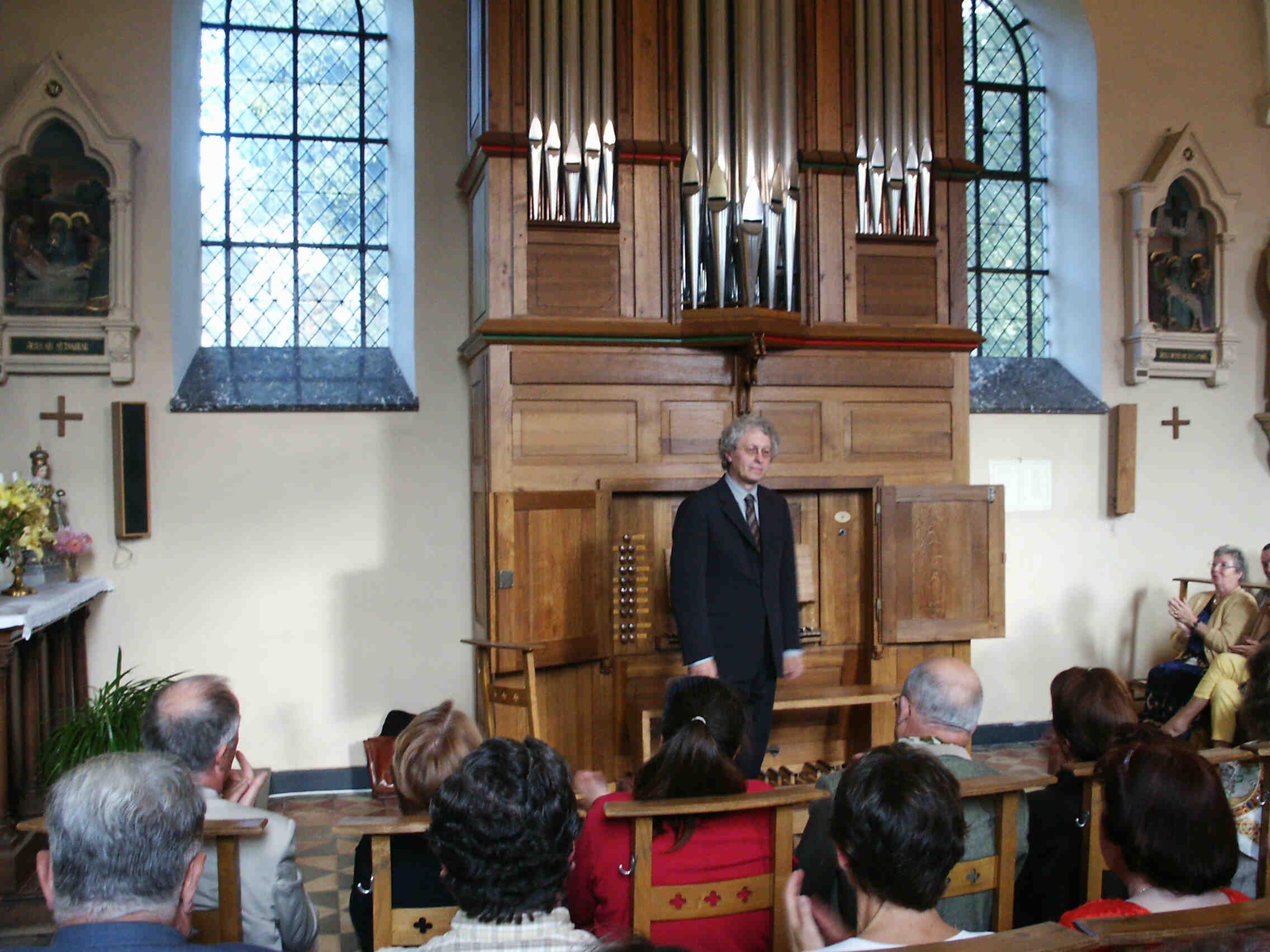
Bernard Foccroulle

Bernard Charles M. E. Th. Foccroulle (born 23 November 1953) is a Belgian organist, composer, conductor and opera director.

== Biography ==
He was born in Liège and studied at the Conservatoire de Liège. Initially, he became known as a member of the Ricercar Consort. He was president of the Jeunesses musicales, and in 1992, he was named director of the Théâtre royal de la Monnaie.

== Works ==
- Resonance (for pipe and electronic organ), 1976
- Acousmie (for organ and synthesizer), 1980
- Tiento de diversos modes, 1982
- Sinforuen (for organ, bells and percussion), 1984
- Capriccio, 1986
