= Stephan MacLeod =

Swiss bass singer and conductor

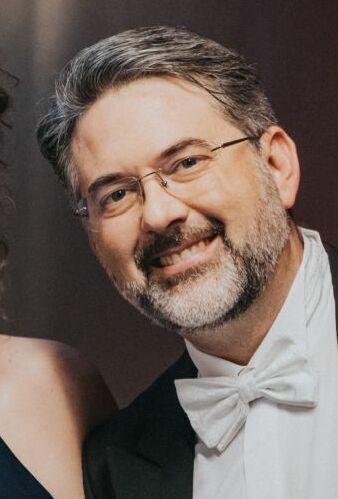
- Stephan MacLeod in 2021
- Born: 1971 (age 54–55); Geneva, Switzerland
- Education: Musikhochschule Köln; Lausanne Conservatory
- Occupations: Bass; Conductor; Academic teacher
- Organizations: Gli Angeli Genève; Lausanne Conservatory

Stephan MacLeod is a Swiss bass and conductor focused on Baroque music in historically informed performance who has performed internationally. He was first bass of the Huelgas Ensemble for five years and took part in the complete recording of Bach's cantatas by Masaaki Suzuki and the Bach Collegium Japan as both a soloist and a choir member. He founded his own ensemble, Gli Angeli Genève, and has also been professor of singing at the Lausanne Conservatory.

== Career ==
MacLeod was born in Geneva in 1971, a son of John MacLeod of MacLeod. He first studied piano and violin, then voice in his hometown, then at the Musikhochschule Köln with Kurt Moll, and in Lausanne, with Gary Magby. In Cologne, he became interested in historically informed performance and collaborated with Reinhard Goebel and his Musica Antiqua Köln. He was first bass of the Huelgas Ensemble for five years. He worked further with Philippe Herreweghe, Gustav Leonhardt, Jordi Savall, and others. He appeared in Europe and beyond.

He founded the ensemble Gli Angeli Genève of voices and instruments in 2005, singing and directing the group. Their first CD was in 2008 named Editor's Choice by Gramophone. He has been professor of singing at the Haute Ecole de Musique of Lausanne from 2013.

== Recordings ==
MacLeod has made over 75 CDs. He took part in the complete recording of Bach's cantatas by Masaaki Suzuki and the Bach Collegium Japan as both a soloist and a choir member. For the first CD of Gli Angeli Genève, he chose Baroque German cantatas by Buxtehude, Bruhns, Telemann and finally Bach's Ich habe genug, BWV 82. Their 2021 recording of Bach's Mass in B minor, with ten singers and 27 instrumentalists, was described by a reviewer from Gramophone as "characterised by swift momentum, crisp articulation and benevolent attention to detail". In 2025 he released the complete chorale cantatas of Bach, which had been recorded over several years.
