= Guy de Mey =

Belgian operatic tenor

- Born: 1955 (age 69–70); Sint-Niklaas, Belgium
- Occupation: Operatic tenor

Guy de Mey (born 4 August 1955) is a Belgian operatic tenor.

== Life and career ==
Guy de Mey was born in Hamme, Belgium on 4 August 1955. He began his education at the Brussels Conservatory where he was a pupil of Stella Dalberg. He pursued further studies with Erna Spoorenberg at the Conservatorium van Amsterdam, and then studied privately with Peter Pears and Éric Tappy.

In 1975, he won the first prize at the Belgian National Pro Civitate competition (now Axion Classics). He made an international career with hundreds of concerts and opera performances throughout Europe, the United States, Canada, Israël and Japan. He made his debut at the Royal Opera House in Cavalli's La Calisto and at La Scala in Káťa Kabanová as Tichon under John Eliot Gardiner and Ariadne auf Naxos under Jeffrey Tate.

Other engagements since 2006 included guest performances in Zürich (first under J. E. Gardiner in L'étoile (Chabrier) and later under Christoph von Dohnányi as Tanzmeister in Ariadne auf Naxos; at Bavarian State Opera Munich he appeared in the world premiere of Alice in Wonderland by Unsuk Chin, as Monsieur Triquet in Krzysztof Warlikowski's production of Eugene Onegin, in Idomeneo and Ariadne auf Naxos all under the direction of Kent Nagano and Bertrand de Billy; at Teatro Real de Madrid as Tichon in Káťa Kabanová under Jiří Bělohlávek, at the Dutch National Opera in The Makropulos Affair as Vitek under Yannick Nézet-Séguin and at Gran Teatro del Liceu, Barcelona, in Monteverdi's L'incoronazione di Poppea under Harry Bicket.

In the 2009/10 season, he sang in Ariadne at Opéra national du Rhin, Strasbourg, at the Grand Théâtre de Genève (Alice in Wonderland), the Flanders Opera (Onegin), at the Opera de Oviedo and returned to the Royal Opera House to sing the part of Guillot de Morfontaine in Manon next to Anna Netrebko and Vittorio Grigolo and on tour to Japan under Antonio Pappano.

He appeared in Mozart's Die Zauberflöte and Monteverdi's L'Orfeo under Roger Norrington at the London Proms and at the English National Opera; Lully's Atys under William Christie at the Paris Opera, in Florence and New York; Berg's Lulu with Teresa Stratas in a production by Ruth Berghaus, and Boris Godunov with José van Dam at the Brussels Opera La Monnaie; Handel's Judas Maccabaeus with the San Francisco Philharmonia Baroque Orchestra; Bach's St Matthew Passion with the Royal Concertgebouw Orchestra Amsterdam; Berlioz' L'enfance du Christ at the Aix-en-Provence Festival; Scarlatti's Mitridate Eupatore at the Schwetzingen Festival; Debussy's Pelléas et Mélisande at the Nantes Opera; Berg's Lulu and Janáček's The Cunning Little Vixen and Káťa Kabanová at the Flemish Opera (Antwerp/Ghent). De Mey appeared with operas by Monteverdi and Cavalli at New Israeli Opera, Spoleto Festival USA/Charleston, Bavarian Opera as well as at the opera houses of Paris and Copenhagen.

De Mey is also well known as a lieder singer. He appeared in recital in Belgium, at the operas in Brussels and Antwerp, in Germany, France, the Netherlands, in Israel and the USA. He sang Schubert's Die schöne Müllerin at the Franz Schubert Festival in Denmark and Schubert's Winterreise at the Flanders Festival.

He has made more than 50 recordings with conductors (John Eliot Gardiner, Ton Koopman, Roger Norrington, Michel Corboz, William Christie, Jordi Savall, Nicholas McGegan, René Jacobs, Marc Minkowski and others). Several of these recordings were awarded international prizes (Grand Prix du Disque, Deutscher Schallplattenpreis, Caecilia Axard, Diapason d'Or). He took part in the project of Ton Koopman and the Amsterdam Baroque Orchestra & Choir to record the complete vocal works of Johann Sebastian Bach.

Since 1996 de Mey has been teaching at the Royal Flemish Conservatory in Antwerp. On December 13, 2008 he received the title of Honorary citizen of the town of Sint-Niklaas.
