= Das jüngste Gericht =

- Oratorio by Dieterich Buxtehude (attributed)
- Catalogue: BuxWV Anh. 3
- Text: Compilation of poetry, Bible verses and chorales
- Language: German
- Vocal: soloists and choir
- Instrumental: 2 violins, viola, continuo (optional: 2 trombones)

Das jüngste Gericht (The Last Judgement), BuxWV Anh. 3, is an anonymous 17th-century oratorio in three acts, attributed to Dieterich Buxtehude. It is also known by its incipit, "Wacht! Euch zum Streit gefasset macht" (Wake up! Prepare yourselves for battle).

== History ==
Buxtehude was organist and Werkmeister (administrator of the church's finances) at the Marienkirche in Lübeck, where he performed his concert series, the Abendmusiken. He possibly performed it as part of the Abendmusiken, a concert series begun by his predecessor, Franz Tunder, and which Buxtehude brought to fame.

The work is only preserved in an undated and anonymous set of parts in the Düben collection. There has been much scholarly debate on the subject of the work's authenticity. The work was first identified and attributed to Buxtehude by Willy Maxton in the 1920s. Maxton assessed it as being Das allerschrocklichste und allererfreulichste (BuxWV 129), an hypothesis which has since been rejected. This was accepted by scholars at the time, including Friedrich Blume who described it as such in the Buxtehude entry for the 1952 edition of Die Musik in Geschichte und Gegenwart. However, the authenticity of the work was disputed by Martin Geck, writing in Die Musikforschung, in 1961. This led to the work being included as a doubtful work in the Buxtehude-Werke-Verzeichnis compiled by Georg Karstädt. The question was covered in-depth in a thesis by Sara C. Ruhle in 1982, but this has not led to definitive conclusions. One strong defender of the work's attribution to Buxtehude has been Kerala J. Snyder.

== Music ==
The oratorio deals with the Last Judgment. Allegorical figures are the Göttliche Stimme (divine voice) and the vices of avarice, frivolity and arrogance. The godless, seeking lust for life, are juxtaposed to the godly, pursuing piety, humility and joy of life. They expect the judgement in deep despair or in joyful expectation. The music combines inwardness (Innerlichkeit) with dramatic impact.

== Recordings ==
Das jüngste Gericht was recorded in 2006 as part of Buxtehude's complete works, Opera Omnia, by the Amsterdam Baroque Orchestra & Choir conducted by Ton Koopman, with soloists Caroline Stam, Orlanda Velez Isidro, Johannette Zomer, Robin Blaze, Andreas Karasiak and Klaus Mertens. Two recordings followed in 2008, one by La Capella Ducale conducted by Roland Wilson, and another, of a shortened version, by the ensemble Weser-Renaissance Bremen conducted by Manfred Cordes.
