= Andreas Karasiak =

German opera singer

- Born: 1968 (age 57–58)
- Education: University of Mainz; Schola Cantorum Basiliensis
- Occupations: Classical tenor; Academic teacher
- Organization: Hochschule für Musik Mainz

Andreas Karasiak (born 1968) is a German classical tenor in opera and concert, and an academic teacher at the Hochschule für Musik Mainz. Known for singing in concerts, he has performed and recorded rarely performed operas and world premieres.

== Career ==
Andreas Karasiak studied voice at the Johannes Gutenberg University of Mainz with Claudia Eder. He studied Baroque music at the Schola Cantorum Basiliensis with René Jacobs in Basel.

Starting in 1999, he sang at the National Theatre Mannheim Mozart parts such as Tamino, Ferrando and Belmonte.

In the field of historically informed performance he has worked with Gustav Leonhardt, Marcus Creed and Philippe Herreweghe, taking part in the project of Ton Koopman and the Amsterdam Baroque Orchestra & Choir Dieterich Buxtehude – Opera Omnia to record the complete works of Dieterich Buxtehude. He has also performed with Helmuth Rilling and Sylvain Cambreling, among others.

In 1998 and again in 2007, he sang the tenor part of Hermann Suter's Le Laudi in Wiesbaden with the Chor von St. Bonifatius, conducted by Gabriel Dessauer. In 2000, he performed and recorded Bach's St Matthew Passion, scored for double chorus, with two boys choirs, Knabenchor Hannover and Thomanerchor, as a celebration of 50 years Knabenchor Hannover, conducted in Hannover by Heinz Hennig. In 2006, he sang the Evangelist in Bach's Christmas Oratorio in the Kreuzkirche with the Dresdner Kreuzchor and the Dresden Philharmonic. He has appeared as the Evangelist in the St Matthew Passion at the Festspielhaus Baden-Baden on Good Friday 2007, conducted by Martin Haselböck, with Stephen Salters, Lynne Dawson, Robin Blaze and Klaus Mertens. In 2009, he appeared in Handel's Solomon with Andreas Scholl and the Schiersteiner Kantorei in the Marktkirche in Wiesbaden. In 2009, Dorothee Mields and Andreas Karasiak were the soloists in the Requiem composition Schwarz vor Augen und es ward Licht of Harald Weiss dedicated to the Knabenchor Hannover, premiered on 31 October 2009 with the NDR Symphony Orchestra, which was recorded. In 2011, he performed the title role in Monteverdi's Il ritorno d'Ulisse in patria in the Theater Münster. Ursula Decker-Bönniger reviewed: "Andreas Karasiak lotet zwischen verhaltener Klage und dramatischen Zornesausbruch die unterschiedlichen Gefühle des Odysseus stimmlich aus" (Andreas Karasiak explores vocally the feelings of Ulisse between restrained lament and dramatic eruption of furor. In 2012, he sang again the role of Jonathan in Handel's Saul, in the final concert celebrating 50 years Schiersteiner Kantorei in Eberbach Abbey, with Christian Immler in the title role.

He has recorded operas that are rarely performed, such as Handel's Lotario, Domenico Cimarosa's Gli Orazi e i Curiazi, Gluck's L'innocenza giustificata, Haydn's Die Feuersbrunst and Franz Schubert's Singspiele Der vierjährige Posten; Die Zwilingsbrüder.

Andreas Karasiak has been teaching voice at the Hochschule für Musik Rheinland-Pfalz and in master classes.

== Recordings ==
- Hermann Suter: Le Laudi, Zofia Kilanowicz, Pamela Pantos, Johann Werner Prein, Chor von St. Bonifatius Wiesbaden, Kinderchor von St. Bonifatius, Witold Lutoslawski Philharmonic Wroclaw, conductor Gabriel Dessauer, 1999
- Bach: Matthäus-Passion, Elisabeth Scholl, Nathalie Stutzmann, Gerd Türk, Thomas Mohr, Hanno Müller-Brachmann, Knabenchor Hannover and Thomanerchor, Akademie für Alte Musik Berlin, conductor Heinz Hennig, Thorofon, 2000
- Mozart: Il re pastore – Annette Dasch, Marlis Petersen, Krešimir Špicer, Arpiné Rahdjian, Balthasar-Neumann-Ensemble, conductor Thomas Hengelbrock, Deutsche Grammophon, DVD 2006
- Buxtehude: Opera omnia II - Vocal works 1, Caroline Stam, Johannette Zomer, Bogna Bartosz, Robin Blaze, Klaus Mertens, Amsterdam Baroque Orchestra & Choir, conductor Ton Koopman, Challenge, 2006
- Buxtehude: Opera omnia V - Vocal works 2, Johannette Zomer, Bogna Bartosz, Daniel Taylor, Jörg Dürmüller, Klaus Mertens, Amsterdam Baroque Orchestra & Choir, conductor Ton Koopman, Challenge, 2007
- Buxtehude: Opera omnia VII - Vocal works 3, Johannette Zomer, Bogna Bartosz, Jörg Dürmüller, Klaus Mertens, Amsterdam Baroque Orchestra & Choir, conductor Ton Koopman, Challenge, 2008
- Buxtehude: Opera omnia XI - Vocal works 4, Bettina Pahn, Miriam Meyer, Siri Thornhill, Johannette Zomer, Patrick van Goethem, Bogna Bartosz, Jörg Dürmüller, Klaus Mertens, Amsterdam Baroque Orchestra & Choir, conductor Ton Koopman, Challenge, 2010
