= Erfreute Zeit im neuen Bunde, BWV 83 =

Church cantata by Johann Sebastian Bach

Erfreute Zeit im neuen Bunde
- BWV 83
- Church cantata by J. S. Bach
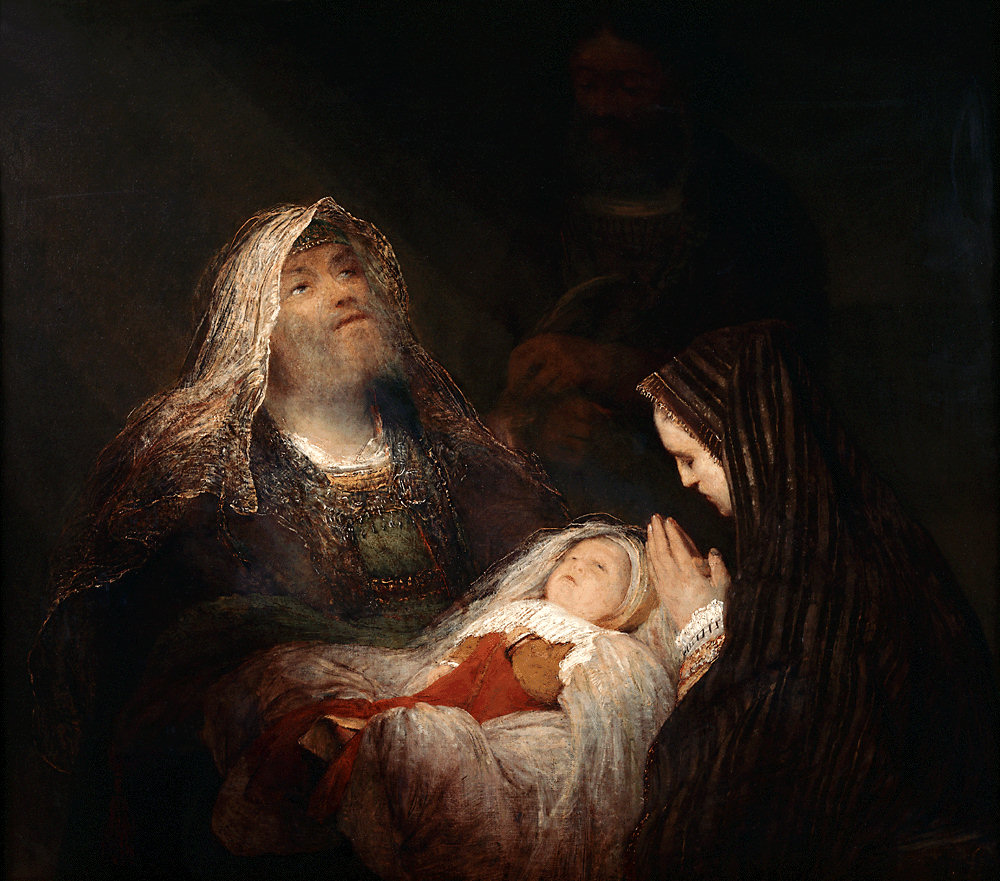
- Simeon's Song of Praise by Aert de Gelder, c. 1700–1710
- Occasion: Purification
- Chorale: "Mit Fried und Freud ich fahr dahin" by Martin Luther
- Performed: 2 February 1724: Leipzig
- Movements: 5
- Vocal: SATB choir; solo: alto, tenor and bass
- Instrumental: 2 horns; 2 oboes; solo violin; 2 violins; viola; continuo

Erfreute Zeit im neuen Bunde (Joyful time in the new covenant), BWV 83, (Note: "BWV" is Bach-Werke-Verzeichnis, a thematic catalogue of Bach's works.) is a church cantata by Johann Sebastian Bach. He wrote it in 1724 in Leipzig for the feast Mariae Reinigung (Purification) and first performed it on 2 February 1724.

== History and words ==
Bach wrote the cantata in his first year in Leipzig for the feast Purification of Mary. The prescribed readings for the feast day were from the book of Malachi, "the Lord will come to his temple" (Malachi 3:1–4), and from the Gospel of Luke, the purification of Mary and the presentation of Jesus at the Temple, including Simeon's canticle Nunc dimittis (Luke 2:22–32). The gospel mentions the purification of Mary, but elaborates on Simeon who had been told he would not die without having seen the Messiah. The canticle ("Lord, now lettest Thou Thy servant depart in peace") is a constant part of the services Compline and Evensong. The unknown poet also concentrates on this aspect of the gospel and connects it to the listener's attitude to his own death. In the second movement, he comments the words of the canticle "Herr, nun lässest du deinen Diener in Friede fahren" by recitative. He shapes movement 3 as a close paraphrase of Hebrews 4:16. Movement 4 recalls the last verse of the gospel, the closing chorale expresses the same thought in Martin Luther's words, the fourth stanza of his hymn "Mit Fried und Freud ich fahr dahin".

The cantata was possibly Bach's first cantata for the occasion. He first performed it on 2 February 1724 and again in 1727. In 1725 he composed a chorale cantata Mit Fried und Freud ich fahr dahin, BWV 125, on Luther's German version of the Canticle of Simeon, in 1727 he wrote the solo cantata Ich habe genung, BWV 82.

== Scoring and structure ==
The cantata in five movements is festively scored for alto, tenor and bass soloists, a four-part choir in the chorale, two horns, two oboes, solo violin, two violins, viola, and basso continuo.

1. Aria (alto): Erfreute Zeit im neuen Bunde
2. Aria (Chorale and recitative, bass): Herr, nun lässest du deinen Diener in Friede fahren, wie du gesaget hast – Was uns als Menschen schrecklich scheint
3. Aria (tenor): Eile, Herz, voll Freudigkeit
4. Recitative (alto): Ja, merkt dein Glaube noch viel Finsternis
5. Chorale: Es ist das Heil und selig Licht

== Music ==
The first da capo aria is richly scored for the full orchestra. Its first section celebrates the "joyful time". The ritornell presents a first motif in upward coloraturas, which is later picked up by the voice, then playful contrasting "choirs" of instruments, and virtuoso figuration of the solo violin. In great contrast the middle section concentrates on "our resting place, our grave", the violin imitating funeral bells by repetitions on open strings.

Movement 2 is singular in Bach's cantatas. It contains the canticle of Simeon, sung by the bass on the eighth psalm tone of Gregorian chant, while a canon is played by all strings in unison and the continuo. After the first verse of the canticle, three sections of secco recitative are interrupted by the canonic music, finally the other two verses of the canticle are treated as the first. The use of psalm tones was already considered an archaism in Bach's time.

In Movement 3 the concertante violin plays endless runs in triplets, to illustrate "Hurry, heart, full of joy", the voice imitates the runs. A short secco recitative leads to the four-part chorale. Bach had used this chorale already in his early funeral cantata Actus tragicus (1707 or 1708).

== Recordings ==
- J. S. Bach: Das Kantatenwerk – Sacred Cantatas Vol. 5, Nikolaus Harnoncourt, Wiener Sängerknaben, Concentus Musicus Wien, soloist of the Vienna Boys Choir, Kurt Equiluz, Max van Egmond, Teldec 1967
- Die Bach Kantate Vol. 24, Helmuth Rilling, Gächinger Kantorei, Bach-Collegium Stuttgart, Helen Watts, Adalbert Kraus, Walter Heldwein, Hänssler 1978
- J. S. Bach: Complete Cantatas Vol. 8, Ton Koopman, Amsterdam Baroque Orchestra & Choir, Elisabeth von Magnus, Jörg Dürmüller, Klaus Mertens, Antoine Marchand 1998
- J. S. Bach: Complete Cantatas Vol. 18, Pieter Jan Leusink, Holland Boys Choir, Netherlands Bach Collegium, Sytse Buwalda, Marcel Beekman, Bas Ramselaar, Brilliant Classics 2000
- J. S. Bach: Cantatas for the Feast of Purification of Mary, John Eliot Gardiner, Monteverdi Choir, English Baroque Soloists, Robin Tyson, Paul Agnew, Peter Harvey, Soli Deo Gloria 2000
- J. S. Bach: Cantatas Vol. 21 – Cantatas from Leipzig 1724, Masaaki Suzuki, Bach Collegium Japan, Robin Blaze, James Gilchrist, Peter Kooy, BIS 2002
