= Mit Fried und Freud (Buxtehude) =

Mit Fried und Freud and Klag-Lied
- by Dieterich Buxtehude
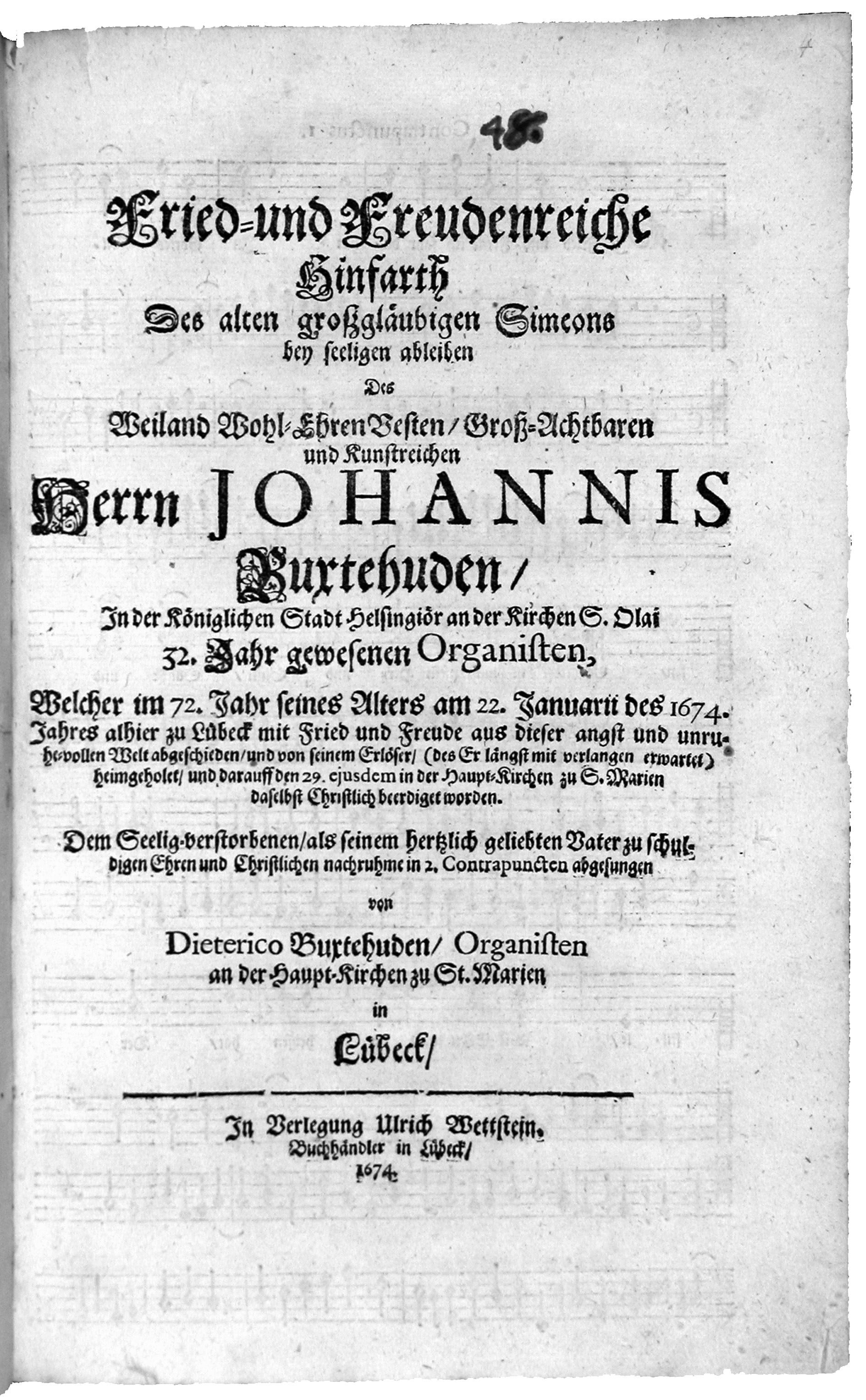
- Title page of the bundle
- Full title: Fried- und Freudenreiche Hinfarth
- Catalogue: BuxWV 76

Mit Fried und Freud
- Catalogue: BuxWV 76a
- Year: 1671
- Text: Mit Fried und Freud ich fahr dahin
- Movements: 2
- Vocal: soprano and bass
- Instrumental: organ or four strings and continuo

Klag-Lied
- Catalogue: BuxWV 76b
- Year: 1674
- Text: by the composer
- Vocal: soprano
- Instrumental: organ or two strings and continuo

Mit Fried und Freud ("With peace and joy"), BuxWV 76, is the common name for a piece of funeral music composed by Dieterich Buxtehude as an homage to his father in 1674. The composer named the work Fried- und Freudenreiche Hinfarth (Departure enriched by Peace and Joy) when he published it the same year. It is a bundle of two compositions, the earlier Mit Fried und Freud, BuxWV 76a, a setting of Luther's hymn Mit Fried und Freud ich fahr dahin composed in 1671 reflecting the death of Menno Hanneken, and the elegy Klag-Lied (Song of mourning, lament), BuxWV 76b, an aria in seven stanzas. The incipit of the elegy, "Muß der Tod denn auch entbinden", translates roughly to "Even if death must separate us". It is one of few compositions published during Buxtehude's lifetime.

== History ==
In 1671, Buxtehude composed funeral music on the death of Menno Hanneken, a superintendent and minister at the Marienkirche in Lübeck, where Buxtehude performed his concert series, the Abendmusiken. Buxtehude composed a canon, Divertisons nous (BuxWV 124), written in an album of Menno's son and dated 1670, showing that he had good relations with the Hanneken family. Buxtehude set Luther's hymn "Mit Fried und Freud ich fahr dahin", the German paraphrase of the Nunc dimittis, or Song of Simeon.

Buxtehude's father Johann Buxtehude had died on 22 January 1674, having worked at St Olaf's, Helsingør, as an organist, and having moved to his son's household after the death of his wife in 1671 and after his own retirement, possibly in 1673. The composer wrote Klag-Lied as an homage to his father, on a poem in seven stanzas which he possibly wrote himself. Both works were probably performed at the funeral.

Buxtehude published both works together the same year. He titled the bundle Fried-und Freudenreiche Hinfarth (Departure enriched by Peace and Joy). It was one of very few publications of his work during his lifetime, and J. G. Walther believed it to be the only one of "his many artful keyboard works" so to appear. The beginning of the long title given on the title page translates as

Departure enriched by Peace and Joy of devout old Simeon, on the occasion of the blessed Decease of Master JOHANNIS Buxtehude, in his life time well-respected, highly honourable, and ingenious, for 32 years Organist at the Church of St. Olaf in the royal City of Elsinore, who here at Lübeck, on 22 January in the Year 1674, in the 72nd Year of his Age, with Peace and Joy departed this Life of Anxieties and Alarms, called Home by his Redeemer...

== Music ==
The first part of the funeral music, composed in 1671, is in two movements of counterpoint and development:

- Contrapunctus I & Evolutio
- Contrapunctus II & Evolutio

The score of the four-part setting in strict counterpoint does not indicate voices or instruments. It can be played on an organ, or by four instruments; and the cantus firmus which appears in the soprano and in the bass can be sung. The soprano begins in Contrapunctus I, the bass takes over in Evolutio, while the soprano has the first bass line. Alto and tenor change similarly. Contrapunctus II has "more elaborate counterpoint", while Evolutio II is a "transposed mirror version of Contrapunctus II". The deliberate display of counterpoint has been compared to Bach's Art of Fugue.

The seven stanzas of the Klag-Lied (or lamentation) are set, without any ritornellos, for soprano, two unspecified instruments and basso continuo. The musicologist Kerala J. Snyder describes the text as "deeply personal in tone, and the sombre music reflects its grief".

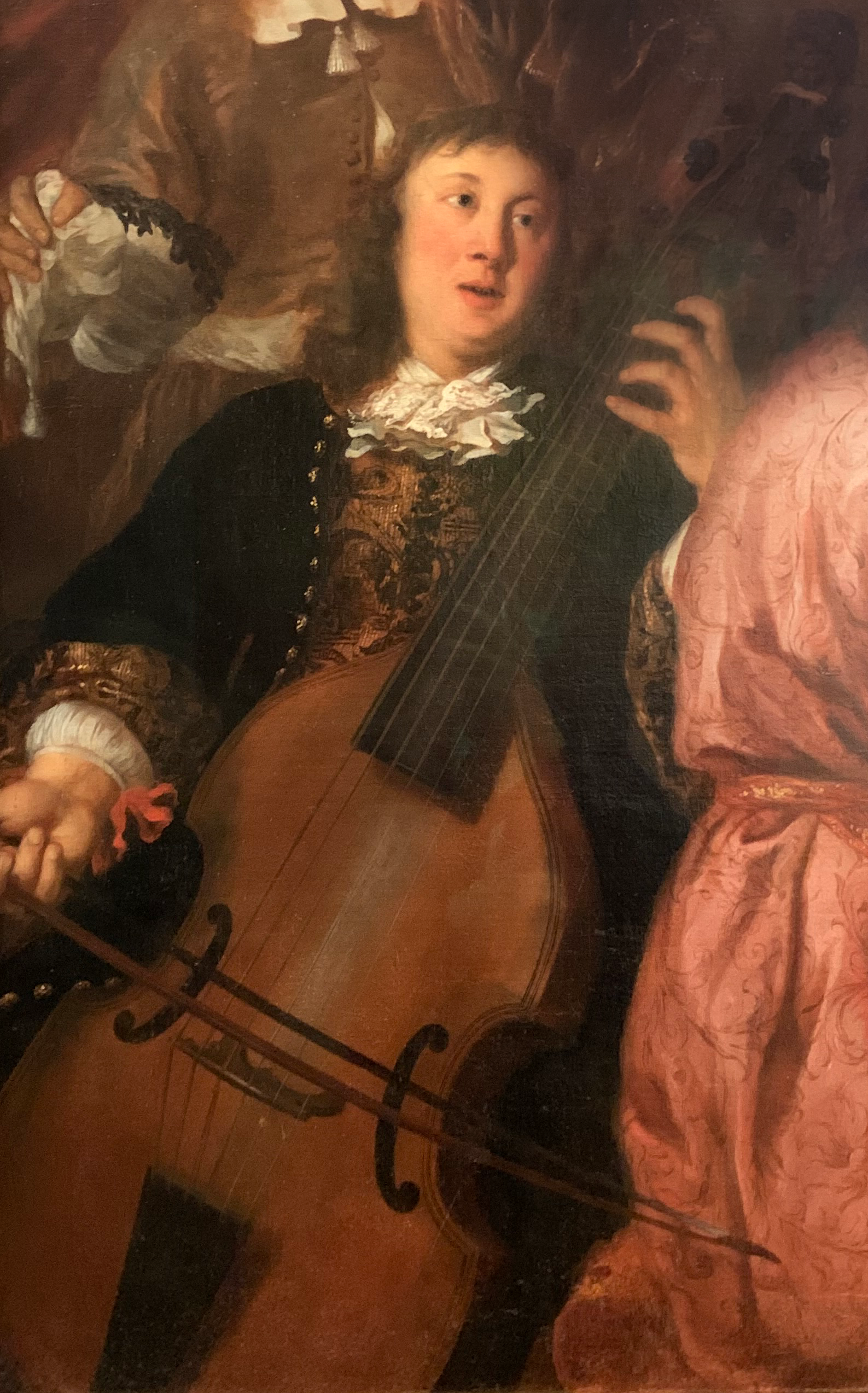
Buxtehude, playing a viol, from A musical party by Johannes Voorhout (1674)

The scoring has been debated. While Walther assumed that the pieces were played on the organ, a manuscript in the Düben collection mentions "viole" (viol), indicating accompaniment by a viol consort or a group of violins and viols. The viol was associated in Germany with funeral music, for example in Buxtehude's Membra Jesu Nostri, a five-part viol consort plays only at the climax of the piece, and a viol is the obbligato instrument in the aria "Es ist vollbracht" in Bach's St John Passion.

== Selected recordings ==
- Greta De Reyghere, Ricercar Consort, Philippe Pierlot (1990)
- Anima Eterna & The Royal Consort, Collegium Vocale Gent, Jos van Immerseel (1994)
- Emma Kirkby, John Holloway, Manfredo Kraemer, Jaap ter Linden, Lars Ulrik Mortensen (1997)
- Opera Omnia XVII - Vocal music vol. 7, Amsterdam Baroque Orchestra & Choir, Ton Koopman (2013)
