= Dieterich Buxtehude – Opera Omnia =

Dieterich Buxtehude – Opera Omnia is a project to record the complete works (in Latin: opera omnia) of the Danish Baroque composer Dieterich Buxtehude, completed in October 2014 and released on Challenge Records.

== History ==
After Ton Koopman and the Amsterdam Baroque Orchestra & Choir had finished a recording of the complete cantatas of Johann Sebastian Bach they began in 2005 the project "Dieterich Buxtehude - Opera Omnia" to record the complete works of Dieterich Buxtehude. Koopman is the president of the "International Dieterich Buxtehude Society" since 2004. As of November 2014, all twenty volumes (on 30 CDs) have been released.

== Singers ==
Soloists for the Buxtehude project who performed also in the Bach cantata project before have included sopranos Caroline Stam and Johannette Zomer, alto Bogna Bartosz, tenor Jörg Dürmüller, and bass Klaus Mertens. Singers new for the Buxtehude have included sopranos Bettina Pahn, Miriam Meyer, Siri Thornhill, Orlanda Velez Isidro, Dorothee Wohlgemuth, altos Robin Blaze, Patrick Van Goethem, Hugo Naessens, Daniel Taylor, tenor Andreas Karasiak and bass Donald Bentvelsen.

== Volumes ==
The works are grouped according to their scoring in harpsichord works, organ works, and vocal works. Koopman himself plays the harpsichord and the organ. The organ works were recorded in different German churches on Baroque organs with different characteristics from a small village organ to one of the major organs of Hamburg. Organ Works 1 was recorded on the Coci/Klapmeyer organ at the St. Nicolai Kirche (pictured) in Altenbruch, restored by Jürgen Ahrend (pictured, 2003/04). Organ Works 2 was recorded on the Wilde/Schnitger organ at the St. Jacobi Kirche (pictured) in Lüdingworth, restored by Jürgen Ahrend (pictured, #107). Organ Works 3 was recorded on the Schnitger organ 1693 in St. Jacobi, Hamburg. Organ Works 4 was recorded on the Gercke/Herbst organ in the Dorfkirche Basedow (pictured) in Basedow. Organ Works 5 was recorded on the Bielfeldt organ (1736) in the St. Wilhadi Kirche in Stade.

In an overview the works are given by their number in the BuxWV, the catalogue of the composer's works.

- Opera Omnia – Volume I – Harpsichord Works 1 (2 CDs)

BuxWV 250, 230, 238, 233, 245, 235, 247, 228, 242, 226, 243, 234, 232

- Opera Omnia – Volume II – Vocal Works 1 (2 CDs)

Wacht! Euch zum Streit gefasset macht (Das jüngste Gericht), BuxWV Anh. 3
Caroline Stam, Orlanda Velez Isidro, Robin Blaze, Andreas Karasiak, Klaus Mertens

- Opera Omnia – Volume III – Organ Works 1

BuxWV 139, 141, 146, 156, 160, 162, 169, 178, 197, 210, 213, 220
Coci/Klapmeyer organ, Altenbruch

- Opera Omnia – Volume IV – Organ Works 2

BuxWV 157, Passacaglia in D minor 161, 163, 164, 170, 173-175, 177, 180-182, 184, 188, 211, 217, 223
Wilde/Schnitger organ, Lüdingworth

- Opera Omnia – Volume V – Vocal Works 2

BuxWV 2, 10, 12, 19, 20, 40, 43, 50-52, 64, 70, 81, 110, 113, 114, 120, 123, 124, Anh. 1
Bettina Pahn, Johannette Zomer, Bogna Bartosz, Patrick van Goethem, Daniel Taylor, Jörg Dürmüller, Andreas Karasiak, Donald Bentvelsen, Klaus Mertens

- Opera Omnia – Volume VI – Harpsichord Works 2

BuxWV 246, 236, 249, 239, Suite in a (deest), 168, 244, 227, 165, 248, 240, 237, 166, Anh. 6, 241, 229

- Opera Omnia – Volume VII – Vocal Works 3

BuxWV Anh. 4, 7, 24, 25, 41, 47, 62, 63, 68, 72, 77, 79, 116, 119 A, 119 B, 122
Miriam Meyer, Bettina Pahn, Johannette Zomer, Bogna Bartosz, Patrick van Goethem, Hugo Naessens, Jörg Dürmüller, Andreas Karasiak, Donald Bentvelsen, Klaus Mertens

- Opera Omnia – Volume VIII – Organ Works 3

BuxWV 149, 179, 225, 140, 185, 159, 148, 187, 176, 145, 183, 213-5, 137, 193, 200
Schnitger organ, Hamburg

- Opera Omnia – Volume IX – Organ Works 4

BuxWV 138, 199, 172, 202, 224, 147, 196, 171, 219, 203, 144, 212, 201, 167, 186, 198, 190, 207, 189
Gercke/Herbst organ, Basedow

- Opera Omnia – Volume X – Organ Works 5

Disc 1.: BuxWV 142, 209, 218, 136, 222, 155, 221, 151, 152, 191, 158, 204, 205, 150,
Disc 2.: BuxWV 153, 194, 192, 143, 206, 208 and preludes in e (2) and G and a chorale prelude on "Nun komm, der Heiden Heiland" by Nicolaus Bruhns
Bielfeldt organ, Stade

- Opera Omnia – Volume XI – Vocal Works 4

BuxWV 33, 56, 26, 71, 86, 11, 27, 8, Anh. 2, 29, 112, 54, 5, 53, 37, 59, 13
Bettina Pahn, Miriam Meyer, Siri Thornhill, Johannette Zomer, Patrick van Goethem, Bogna Bartosz, Jörg Dürmüller, Andreas Karasiak, Klaus Mertens

- Opera Omnia – Volume XII – Chamber Music 1

BuxWV 266, 272, 267, 273, Anh. 5, 271, 268, 269

- Opera Omnia – Volume XIII – Chamber Music 2

BuxWV 252 253 254 255 256 257 258

- Opera Omnia – Volume XIV – Vocal Works 5

BuxWV 55, 39, 44, 38, 9, 45, 58, 57
Siri Thornhill, Dorothee Wohlgemuth, Klaus Mertens, Miriam Meyer, Bettina Pahn, Jörg Dürmüller

- Opera Omnia – Volume XV – Chamber Music 3

Triosonatas opus 2: BuxWV 259, 260, 261, 262, 263, 264, 265

- Opera Omnia – Volume XVI – Vocal Works 6

Membra Jesu Nostri BuxWV 75
Amsterdam Baroque Orchestra & Choir (May 2012)

- Opera Omnia – Volume XVII – Vocal Works 7 (2 CDs)

BuxWV 6, 3, 96, 69, Mit Fried und Freud 76, 90, 21, 31, 42, 78, 92, 48, 49, 61, 102, 14, 107, 18
Amsterdam Baroque Orchestra & Choir (June 2013)

- Opera Omnia – Volume XVIII – Vocal Works 8 (2 CDs)

BuxWV 101, 82, 32, 99, 67, 73, 98, 121, 74, 36, 100, 87, 109, 97, 93, 34
Amsterdam Baroque Orchestra & Choir (November 2013)

- Opera Omnia – Volume XIX – Vocal Works 9

BuxWV 104, 94, 106, 105, 91, 1, 30, 46, 95, 83
Amsterdam Baroque Orchestra & Choir (August 2014)

- Opera Omnia – Volume XX – Vocal Works 10 (2 CDs)

BuxWV 103, 22, 108, 115, 89, 80, 15, 17, 66. 85, 88, 23, 60, 84, 118, 28, 117, 111, 35
Amsterdam Baroque Orchestra & Choir (October 2014)

== Sources ==
- Schneider, Matthias (2015). "Dieterich Buxtehude: Opera Omnia. Gesamteinspielung durch Ton Koopman". In Koopman, Ton (ed.). Buxtehude-Studien (in German). Vol. 1. Bonn. pp. 161–164. ISBN 978-3-928412-18-6.
