= Passacaglia and Fugue in C minor, BWV 582 =

Organ piece by Johann Sebastian Bach

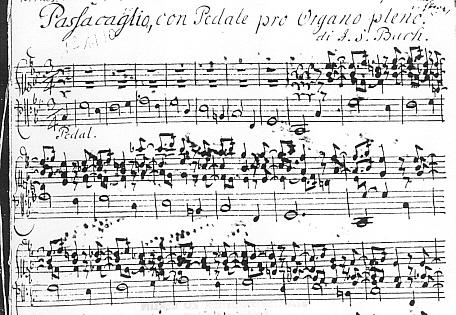
One of the manuscript copies of BWV 582, first page

BWV 582 played by Andreas Arand at the Kreuzbergkirche in Bonn

Passacaglia and Fugue in C minor (BWV 582) is an organ piece by Johann Sebastian Bach. Presumably composed early in Bach's career, it is one of his most important and well-known works, and an important influence on 19th- and 20th-century passacaglias: Robert Schumann described the variations of the passacaglia as "intertwined so ingeniously that one can never cease to be amazed."

== History ==
The autograph manuscript of BWV 582 is currently considered lost; the work, as is typical for pieces by Bach and his contemporaries, is known only through a number of copies. There is some evidence that the original was notated in organ tablature. It is not known precisely when Bach composed the work, but the available sources point to the period between 1706 and 1713. It is possible that BWV 582 was composed in Arnstadt soon after Bach's return from Lübeck (where he may have studied Buxtehude's ostinato works).

The first half of the passacaglia's ostinato, which also serves as the fugue's main subject, was most probably taken from a short work by the French composer André Raison, Christe: Trio en passacaille from Messe du deuxieme ton of the Premier livre d'orgue. It is possible that the second half of the ostinato was also taken from Raison, the bass line of Christe: Trio en chaconne of Messe du sixieme ton of the same publication is very similar. See Example 1 for Bach's and Raison's themes.

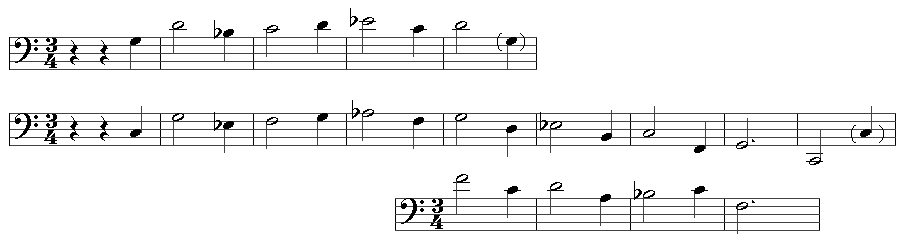
The ostinato of Bach's passacaglia is shown in the center; the corresponding theme from Raison's works are shown above (Christe: Trio en passacaille) and below (Christe: Trio en chaconne). Although the Trio en chaconne is not identical to Bach's theme, it shares with it a similar construction and the same fall of a fifth at the end.

However, some scholars dispute Raison's influence. Bach's work shares some features with north German ostinato works, most notably Buxtehude's two chaconnes (BuxWV 159 and 160) and a passacaglia (BuxWV 161), and there is clear influence of Pachelbel's chaconnes in several variations and the overall structure.

== Analysis ==
=== Passacaglia ===
Awadagin Pratt plays BWV 582 on a Steinway piano in the White House

The passacaglia is in 3/4 time, which is typical of the form. Bach's ostinato comprises eight bars, which is unusual but not unheard of: an ostinato of the same length is used, for example, in Johann Krieger's organ passacaglia. The opening of the piece, which consists of the ostinato stated in the pedal with no accompaniment from the manuals, is slightly more unusual, although this idea also occurs elsewhere, and may even have been used by Buxtehude.

There are 20 variations in BWV 582/1. The first begins with a typical C minor affekt, "a painful longing" according to Spitta, similar to the beginning of Buxtehude's Chaconne in C minor, BuxWV 159. Numerous attempts have been made to figure out an overarching symmetrical structure of the work, but scholars have yet to agree on a single interpretation. Particularly important attempts were made by Christoph Wolff and Siegfried Vogelsänger. Some scholars have speculated that there is a symbolic component to the structure of the work: for instance, Martin Radulescu argues that BWV 582/1 is "in the form of a cross".

There is agreement among most scholars that the Passacaglia builds up until its climax in variation twelve. This is followed by three quiet variations, forming a short intermezzo, and then the remaining five variations end the work.

Bach performer and scholar Marie-Claire Alain suggested that the 21 variations are broken down into 7 groups of 3 similar variations, each opening with a quotation from a Lutheran chorale, treated similarly to the Orgel-Büchlein written at a similar time:

- Bars 8–12, the top part spells out the opening notes of "Nun komm' der Heiden Heiland"
- Bars 24–48, a cantilena spells out "Von Gott will ich nicht lassen"
- Bars 49–72, the scales are a reference to "Vom Himmel kam der Engel Schar"
- Bars 72–96, recalling the "star" motif from "Herr Christ, der Ein'ge Gottes-Sohn"
- Bars 96–120, ornamented figure similar to that in "Christ lag in Todesbanden" accompanies theme in the soprano then moving successively to alto and bass
- Bars 144–168 "Ascending intervals in bass recall the Easter chorale "Erstanden ist der heil'ge Christ".

Alain also points out that the numbers (21 repetitions of the Passacaglia ground and 12 statements of the fugue subjects) are inversions.

=== Fugue ===
The passacaglia is followed, without break, by a double fugue. The first half of the passacaglia ostinato is used as the first subject; a transformed version of the second half is used as the second subject. Both are heard simultaneously in the beginning of the fugue. A countersubject enters immediately afterwards and is then used throughout the piece. When the three subjects appear simultaneously, they never do so in the same combination of voices twice; this therefore is a permutation fugue, possibly inspired by Johann Adam Reincken's works.

As the fugue progresses, Bach ventures into major keys (E♭ – relative to C minor – and B♭) and the time between the statements increases from 1–3 bars to 7–13.

== Transcriptions ==
The passacaglia has been transcribed for orchestra by Leopold Stokowski, Ottorino Respighi, René Leibowitz, Eugene Ormandy, Sir Andrew Davis and Tomasz Golka and for piano by numerous composer/pianists including Eugen d'Albert, Georgy Catoire, Max Reger (in a version for 2 pianos), Fazıl Say, Krystian Zimerman, Émile Naoumoff and Awadagin Pratt. It has also been arranged for a brass quintet by Neil Balm and performed by The Canadian Brass. A transcription for viol consort was recorded by the UK group Fretwork in 2005. In 2006, the passacaglia was transcribed for handbells by Kevin McChesney and recorded by Cast of Bronze from Dallas, Texas. The passacaglia was also transcribed by Donald Hunsberger for the Eastman Wind Ensemble (symphonic wind ensemble) and for the Eastman Trombone Choir (trombone octet). In 2009, the work was transcribed for string quartet by Nicholas Kitchen for performance by the Borromeo String Quartet.

In 1993, the Passacaglia only (arranged by Bert Lams) was recorded by Robert Fripp's group The Robert Fripp String Quintet in the studio album The Bridge Between.

Guillermo Cides released his re-arrangement of Passacaglia for Chapman Stick and loop pedal on his album 'Primitivo' in 1998 and has performed this piece on stage on several occasions.

In Stokowski's orchestral transcription the whole of the coda is slow and fortissimo without the possibility of a final massive rallentando. He made six commercial recordings of it between 1928 and 1972.

== Notable recordings ==
- Leopold Stokowski (orchestration)
  - Philadelphia Orchestra, His Master's Voice D 1702 – D 1703 (1931)
  - International Festival Youth Orchestra, Cala Records CACD0551 (1969)
- Isolde Ahlgrimm, Ammer pedal harpsichord (1937/1941), Philips, (1956)
- E. Power Biggs, organ, Busch-Reisinger Museum, Harvard University (1958)
- Helmut Walcha, Jacobus Caltus van Hagerbeer organ at St. Laurenskerk in Alkmaar, Archiv Produktion, (1962)
- Virgil Fox, organ, Bach Live at Fillmore East, Decca (1971) – live recording from the Heavy Organ concert series; Philharmonic Hall (later Avery Fisher Hall), Command Records (1963)
- Michel Chapuis, Botzen Brothers organ of Church of Our Savior, Copenhagen, Valois, (1967)
- The Godfather Soundtrack, heard over the baptism/execution scene (1972)
- Anthony Newman, pedal harpsichord, Columbia Masterworks (1968)
- Karl Richter, Silbermann Great Organ of Freiberg Cathedral (recorded in 1978 – released in 1980)
- Peter Hurford, Casavant Frères tracker organ, Church of Our Lady of Sorrows, Toronto, Canada (1984)
- André Isoir, organ Basilika Weingarten, Calliope (1988) – including use of the 49 rank pedal mixture "la force" on the bottom pedal C throughout
- Ton Koopman, organ Basilika Ottobeuren, Novalis/Brilliant (1989)
- Christopher Herrick, organ Stadtkirche Zofingen, Hyperion (1990)
- Simon Preston, Sauer organ of St. Peter, Waltrop, Deutsche Grammophon (1991)
- Marie-Claire Alain, organ Stiftskirche Grauhof, Erato (1994)
- Ton Koopman, organ Grote Kerk, Maassluis, Teldec (1994)
- Douglas Amrine, Colin Booth pedal harpsichord, Priory (1995)
- Kevin Bowyer, Marcussen organ of Saint Hans Church, Odense, Nimbus (1998)
- Hans-André Stamm, Trost Organ in Waltershausen, Germany (2000)
- William Porter, Paul Fritts organ Pacific Lutheran University, Loft Recordings (2000)
- Michael Murray, Walcker Orgelbau Great Organ at Methuen Memorial Music Hall, Telarc (2002; orig. 1980)
- Joseph Nolan, organ of Buckingham Palace ballroom, www.signumrecords.com (2007)
- Bernard Foccroulle, Schnitger organ van de Martinikerk te Groningen, Ricercar (2008)
- Ton Koopman, Tokyo Opera City Concert Hall Organ, Japan (2008)
- Chicago Symphony Orchestra Brass, CSO Resound (2011)

== See also ==
- List of compositions by Johann Sebastian Bach
