= In dulci jubilo (Buxtehude) =

Christmas cantata by D. Buxtehude

- by Dieterich Buxtehude
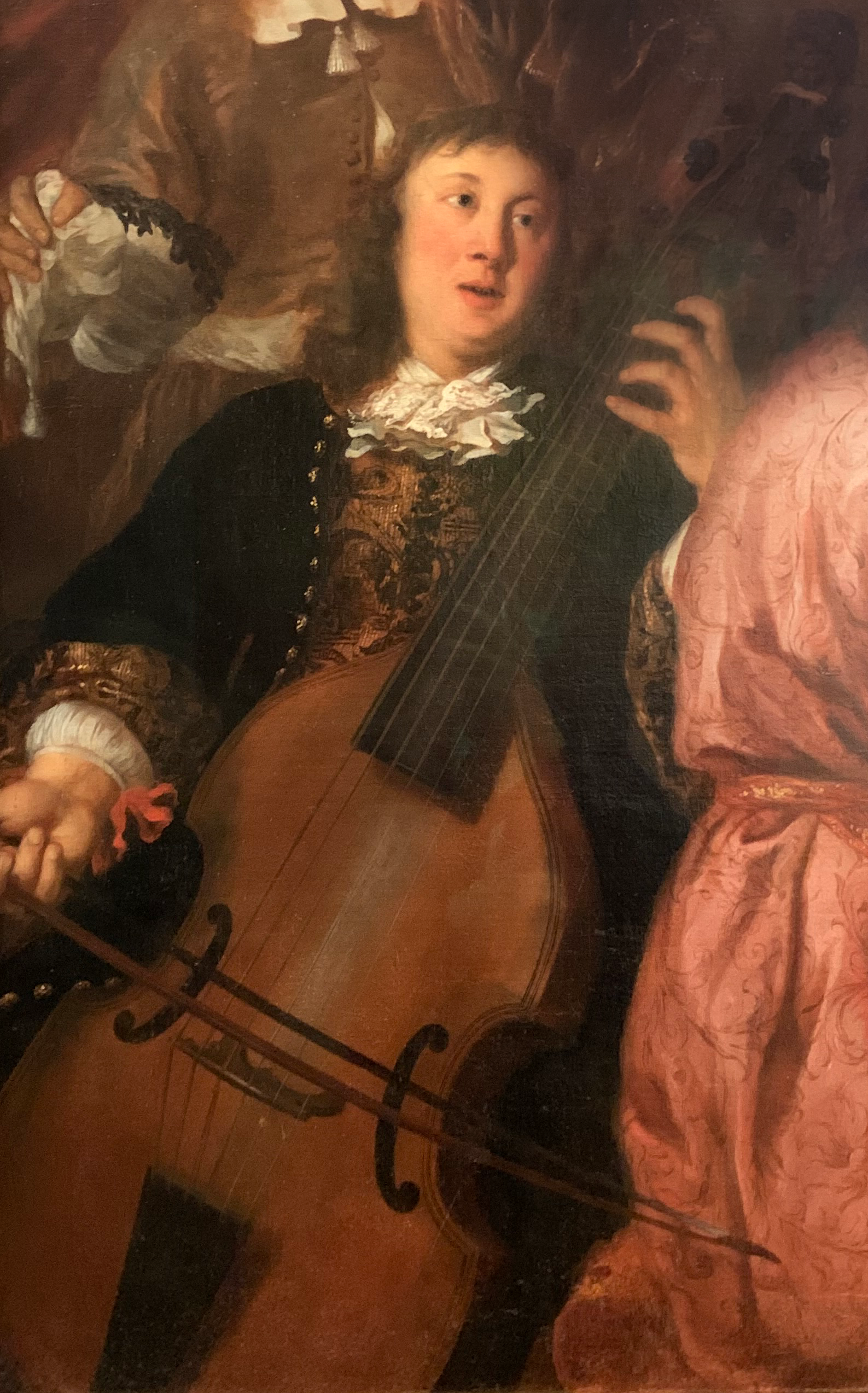
- Buxtehude, playing a viol, in 1674
- English: In sweet rejoicing
- Catalogue: BuxWV 52
- Text: "In dulci jubilo"
- Composed: 1680s
- Vocal: 2 sopranos and bass
- Instrumental: 2 violins and continuo

In dulci jubilo ("In sweet rejoicing"), BuxWV 52, is a Christmas cantata by Dieterich Buxtehude, setting the Christmas carol "In dulci jubilo" for three voices, two violins and continuo. He composed it between 1680 and 1685, setting the four stanzas differently. It was published in the Düben collection.

== History ==
Buxtehude composed In dulci jubilo between 1680 and 1685. It is based in text and tune on the medieval Christmas carol "In dulci jubilo", a song in both Latin and German. The setting is for three voices, in modern editions given as soprano, alto and bass, two violins and continuo. It was published in Sweden in the Düben collection.

== Music ==
The four stanzas of the song are set with instrumental ritornellos, short ritornellos between the lines and longer ritornellos between the stanzas. The settings of the first three stanzas feature only minor differences in all parts, while the final stanza, speaking of the wish to be where the angels sing, is set differently.
