= Passacaglia in D minor, BuxWV 161 =

The Passacaglia in D minor (BuxWV 161) is an organ work by Dieterich Buxtehude. It is generally acknowledged as one of his most important works, and was possibly an influence on J.S. Bach's Passacaglia and Fugue in C minor (BWV 582), as well as Brahms' music.

== Provenance ==
Buxtehude's passacaglia only survives in a single source: the so-called Andreas Bach Buch, compiled by Johann Sebastian's eldest brother, Johann Christoph Bach (1671–1721). The same collection contains Buxtehude's other ostinato organ works: two chaconnes (BuxWV 159–160) and Praeludium in C (BuxWV 137), which incorporates a short chaconne. No information on the date of composition survives. Buxtehude scholar Michael Belotti suggested that all three ostinato works were composed after 1690. Kerala Snyder, on the basis of the passacaglia's complex form (see below), also argues that it is a late work.

== Structure ==
The work is in 3/2 time with a four-bar ostinato pattern:

There are four sections, exploring a total of three keys. The first section is in D minor (the tonic), the second in F major (the relative major), the third in A minor (the dominant), and the fourth returns to D minor. The sections are connected by short modulatory passages. Each section contains seven variations on the seven-note ostinato. Modulation was rarely seen in ostinato variations at the time; nevertheless, an Italian composer of the mid-17th century, Bernardo Storace, used the same scheme in his passacaglias (four sections in different keys, connected by short transitions); but it is unlikely that Buxtehude knew Storace's work.

Buxtehude's lifelong interest in numerology is exhibited in the passacaglia's intricate structure. The numbers 4 and 7 are the foundation of the entire piece. The ostinato pattern is composed of 7 notes in 4 bars, and it appears 28 times (4 × 7 = 28). There are 4 sections, each 28 bars long. The non-thematic bars (three interludes, each 3 bars long, an upbeat bar at the beginning and the last bar for the final chord) add up to 11 (4 + 7 = 11). These numerical aspects have attracted some attention from scholars, and are explained variously as a representation of Mary (thus making the Passacaglia a liturgical piece, to be played before the Magnificat), or as astronomical concepts, the four sections referring to the four principal phases of the Moon (i.e. first quarter, full moon, last quarter and new moon).

== Reception ==
Philip Spitta discussed Buxtehude's work in his 1873 Bach biography, and remarked that "for beauty and importance [Buxtehude's ostinato works] take the precedence of all the works of the kind of the time, and are in the first rank of Buxtehude's compositions. [Indeed], there is no piece of music of that time known to me which surpasses it, or even approaches it, in affecting, soul-piercing intensity of expression." Spitta's opinion was shared by Johannes Brahms (who mistakenly referred to the passacaglia as "Ciaccona"):

...when I become acquainted with such a beautiful piece as the Ciaccona in D minor by Buxtehude, I can hardly resist sharing it with a publisher, simply for the purpose of creating joy for others.

German author Hermann Hesse cited this piece in his 1919 novel Demian. Buxtehude's passacaglia is a source of inspiration to the two central characters. The protagonist describes the piece as "seltsame, innige, in sich selbst versenkte, sich selber belauschende Musik"—"strange, intimate music which sank in itself and observed itself." Werner Breig, writing the liner for Helmut Walcha's recording of the passacaglia in 1978, called it Buxtehude's most mature work, and the pinnacle of Buxtehude's music for organ: "The reason for this may lie in the fact that it makes the most exhaustive use of the potential of the polarity of strictness and freedom. The basic theme heard unchanging in the pedal is contrasted with a complex of upper voices characterized by a positively overflowing wealth of invention."

== In popular media ==
The passacaglia appears during an interlude in the music video for South Korean group BTS's song "Blood Sweat & Tears", in which lines of Hesse's Demian are read by member RM and member SUGA is seen playing the organ.
