= Der Herr ist mit mir (Buxtehude) =

Der Herr ist mit mir (The Lord is on my side), BuxWV 15, is a cantata by Dieterich Buxtehude. It is scored for two violins, violone, basso continuo, and four voices (soprano, alto, tenor, basso). The text is taken from Psalm 118 (6-7).

== Text ==
German original Der Herr ist mit mir, darum fürchte ich mich nicht, was können mir Menschen tun? Der Herr ist mit mir, mir zu helfen, und ich will meine Lust sehen an meinen Feinden. Alleluia	English (Psalm 118, 6-7, KJV) The Lord is on my side; I will not fear: what can man do unto me? The Lord taketh my part with them that help me: therefore shall I see my desire upon them that hate me. Hallelujah

== Recordings ==
- 6 Cantatas, Orchestra Anima Eterna & The Royal Consort, Collegium Vocale, Jos van Immerseel — 1994 — Channel Classics CCS 7895
- Festival Baroque, Ottawa Bach Choir, Lisette Canton

== See also ==
- List of compositions by Dieterich Buxtehude
