= Mit Fried und Freud ich fahr dahin =

1524 hymn written by Martin Luther

- Hymn by Martin Luther
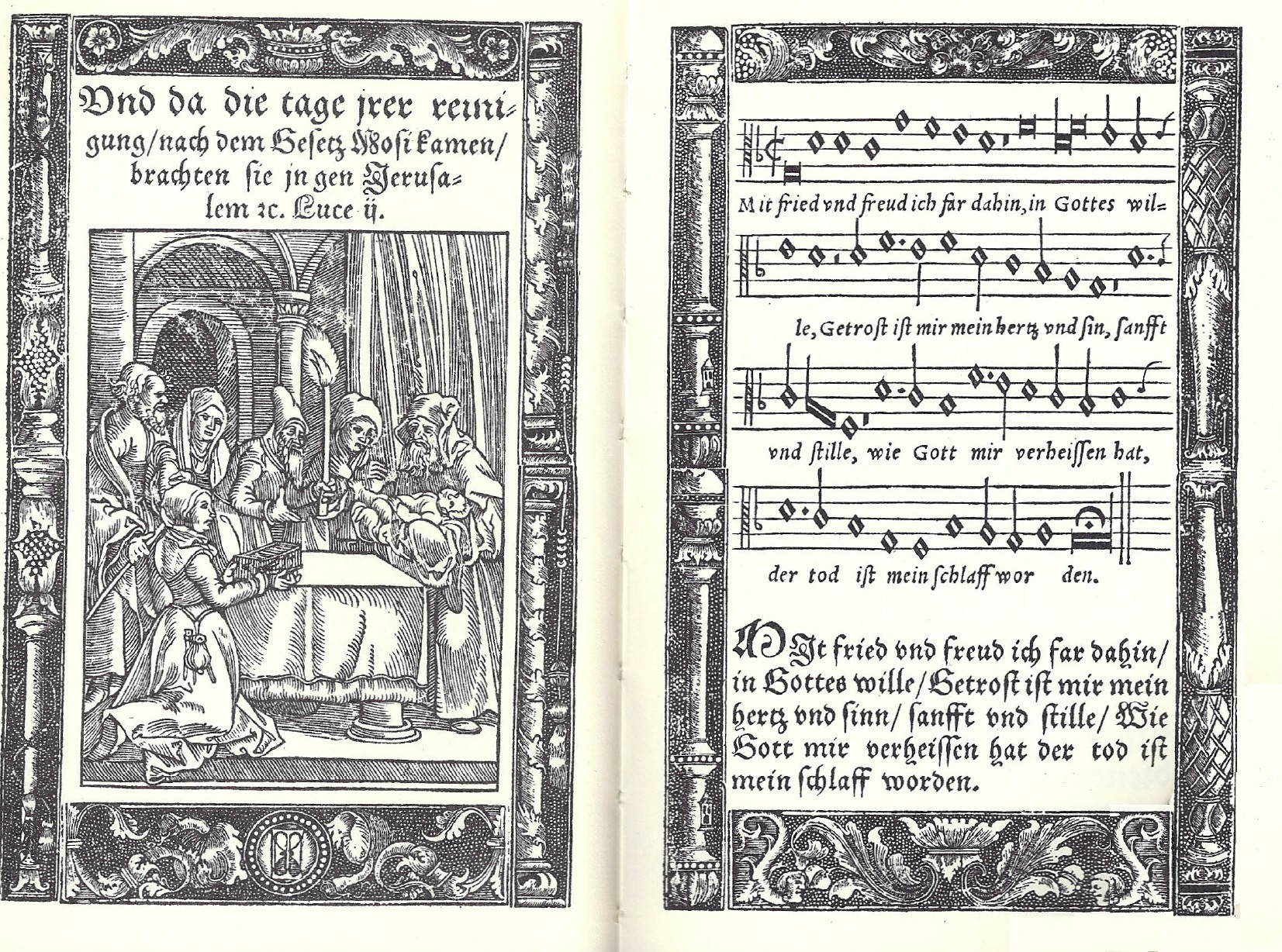
- Text and melody with biblical illustration, Bapstsches Gesangbuch, 1545
- Catalogue: Zahn 3986
- Text: by Martin Luther
- Language: German
- Based on: Nunc dimittis
- Published: 1524

"Mit Fried und Freud ich fahr dahin" (German: [mɪt ˈfʁiːt ʔʊnt ˈfʁɔʏt ʔɪç ˈfaːɐ̯ daˈhɪn]; In peace and joy I now depart) is a hymn by Martin Luther, a paraphrase in German of the Nunc dimittis, the canticle of Simeon. Luther wrote the text and melody, Zahn No. 3986, in 1524 and it was first published in the same year. Originally a song for Purification, it has been used for funerals. Luther included it in 1542 in Christliche Geseng ... zum Begrebniss (Christian chants ... for funeral).

The hymn appears in several translations, for example Catherine Winkworth's "In peace and joy I now depart", in nine hymnals. It has been used as the base for music, especially for vocal music such as Dieterich Buxtehude's funeral music Mit Fried und Freud and Johann Sebastian Bach's chorale cantata Mit Fried und Freud ich fahr dahin, BWV 125.

== History ==
The text and melody were composed by Luther in the spring of 1524. Later in the same year, it was published in Wittenberg in Johann Walter's Eyn geystlich Gesangk Buchleyn (Wittenberg hymnal), but was not included in the Erfurt Enchiridion. Originally a song for Purification, it has been used for funerals. Luther included it in 1542 in Christliche Geseng ... zum Begrebniss (Christian chants ... for funeral) as one of six hymns.

Luther, a former monk, was familiar with the Latin Nunc dimittis from the daily night prayer (compline). The hymn was dedicated to the celebration of the Purification on 2 February, which was kept by the Lutherans as a feast day. It became also one of the most important songs for the dying (Sterbelied) and for funerals. It is listed among those in the Protestant hymnal Evangelisches Gesangbuch as No. 519.

== Text ==
The hymn is based on the Nunc dimittis, the canticle of Simeon. Luther expanded the thoughts of each of the four verses to a stanza of six lines. The first stanza expresses accepting death in peace (Luke 2:29), the second gives as a reason the meeting with the Saviour (Luke 2:30), the third accents his coming for all people (Luke 2:31), the fourth the coming as a light for the heathen and glory for Israel.(Luke 2:31) The lines are of different length, meter 8.4.8.4.7.7, stressing single statements. The hymn appears in several translations. The one used here is Catherine Winkworth's "In peace and joy I now depart", found in nine hymnals, for example as No. 48 in the Evangelical Lutheran Hymnary.

Hymn text
Canticle verse
English translation

Mit Fried und Freud ich fahr dahin
in Gotts Wille;
getrost ist mir mein Herz und Sinn,
sanft und stille,
wie Gott mir verheißen hat:
der Tod ist mein Schlaf worden.

Herr, nun lässt du deinen
Diener in Frieden fahren,
wie du gesagt hast; (29)

In peace and joy I now depart,
According to God's will,
For full of comfort is my heart,
So calm and sweet and still;
So doth God His promise keep,
And death to me is but a sleep.

Das macht Christus, wahr' Gottes Sohn,
der treu Heiland,
den du mich, Herr, hast sehen lan
und g'macht bekannt,
dass er sei das Leben mein
und Heil in Not und Sterben.

denn meine Augen haben
deinen Heiland gesehen, (30)

'Tis Christ hath wrought this work for me,
Thy dear and only son,
Whom Thou hast suffer'd me to see,
And made Him surely known
As my Help when trouble's rife,
And even in death itself my Life.

Den hast du allen vorgestellt
mit groß Gnaden,
zu seinem Reich die ganze Welt
heißen laden
durch dein teuer heilsam Wort,
an allem Ort erschollen.

den du bereitet hast
vor allen Völkern, (31)

For Thou In mercy unto all
Hast set this Saviour forth;
And to His kingdom Thou dost call
The nations of the earth
Through His blessed wholesome Word,
That now in every place is heard.

Er ist das Heil und selig Licht
für die Heiden,
zu 'rleuchten, die dich kennen nicht,
und zu weiden.
Er ist deins Volks Israel
Preis, Ehre, Freud und Wonne.

ein Licht, zu erleuchten
die Heiden und zum Preis
deines Volkes Israel. (32)

He is the heathens' saving Light,
And He will gently lead
Those who now know Thee not aright,
And in His pastures feed;
While His people's joy He is,
Their Sun, their glory, and their bliss.

== Music ==
BWV 616
MIDI representation of organ prelude (1:33)

The cantus firmus in the dorian mode, Zahn 3986, follows the text of the first stanza. The melody, which could predate Luther, contains figura corta motifs, in this case two quavers followed by a crotchet, an anapaest; for dactyls, with a long beat followed by two beats, these were motifs denoting "joy", in the classification of chorales introduced by Albert Schweitzer. In the fourth line, the melody has a descending scale for the text "sanft und stille" (soft and still). There have been several settings of the hymn for organ. In 1674 Dieterich Buxtehude composed a setting of the hymn as an elegy on the death of his father: the chorale prelude BuxWV 76 for two manuals and pedal. In the 1710s, Johann Sebastian Bach composed an organ chorale prelude BWV 616 as part of the Orgelbüchlein. Twentieth-century organ settings include Max Reger's Choral Preludes Nos. 5 and 10, Op. 79b (1901–03), and Ernst Pepping's Partita No. 3 (1953).

Several composers have written vocal settings, some intended for funerals. Four-part choral settings have been composed by Johann Walter (1524), Lupus Hellinck, published in 1544, Bartholomäus Gesius (1601), Michael Praetorius, Johann Hermann Schein, Samuel Scheidt and others. Heinrich Schütz used it in movement 21 of his Musikalische Exequien, composed for the funeral of Henry II, Count of Reuss-Gera. Buxtehude wrote four different versions for the four stanzas in complex counterpoint as a funeral music for Menno Hanneken, Mit Fried und Freud, which he later expanded by a Klag-Lied (lament) into a funeral music for his father. Bach used the hymn as the base for his chorale cantata Mit Fried und Freud ich fahr dahin, BWV 125. Bach used single stanzas in his cantatas, the funeral cantata Gottes Zeit ist die allerbeste Zeit, BWV 106 (c. 1708), Christus, der ist mein Leben, BWV 95, for the 16th Sunday after Trinity (1723), and Erfreute Zeit im neuen Bunde, BWV 83, for Purification 1724). Georg Philipp Telemann composed around 1729 a first sacred cantata for voices, strings and basso continuo, and a second cantata for voice, violin and continuo which is lost. Johannes Brahms used the first stanza to conclude his motet Warum ist das Licht gegeben dem Mühseligen?
