= Membra Jesu Nostri =

1680 cycle of cantatas by Dieterich Buxtehude

Membra Jesu nostri
- Cantata cycle by Dieterich Buxtehude
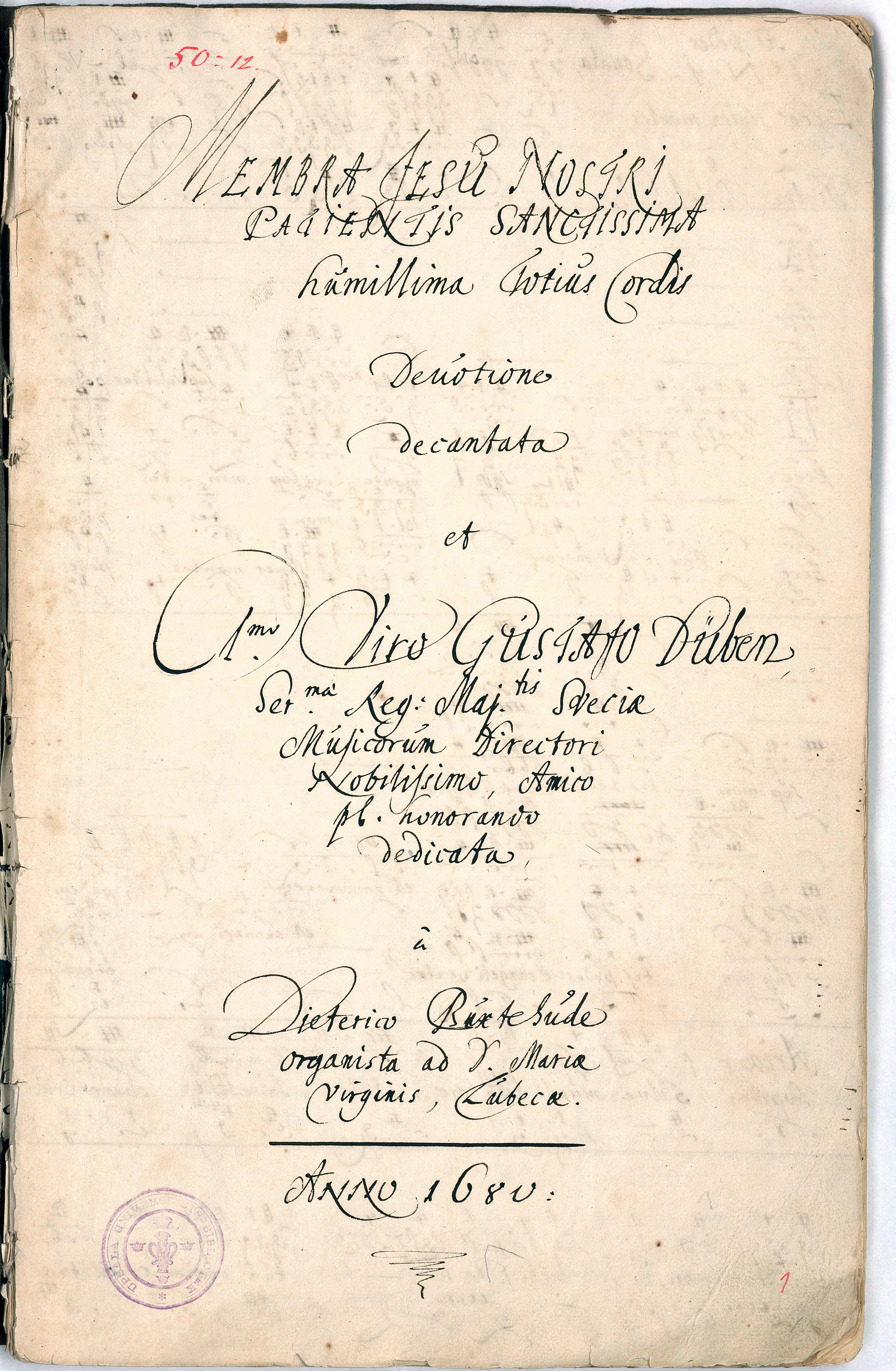
- Title page
- English: Limbs Most Holy of Our Suffering Jesus
- Full title: Membra Jesu nostri patientis sanctissima
- Catalogue: BuxWV 75
- Text: Bible; Rhythmica oratio by Arnulf of Leuven
- Language: Latin
- Composed: 1680
- Movements: 43, in seven cantatas
- Vocal: 2 sopranos, alto, tenor, bass
- Instrumental: violins in cantatas 1 to 5 and 7; viols in 6; continuo

Membra Jesu nostri, BuxWV 75, is a cycle of seven cantatas composed in 1680 by Dieterich Buxtehude and dedicated to Gustaf Düben. More specifically and fully it is, in Buxtehude's phrase, a “devotione decantata,” or “sung devotion,” titled Membra Jesu nostri patientis sanctissima, which translates from the Latin as Limbs Most Holy of Our Suffering Jesus. Regarding genre, the cycle consists in seven concerto-aria cantatas, a form that had emerged in Germany in the 1660s. The stanzas of its main text are drawn from the medieval hymn Salve mundi salutare, also known as the Rhythmica oratio, formerly ascribed to Bernard of Clairvaux but now thought to be by Arnulf of Leuven. Each cantata addresses a part of Jesus' crucified body: feet, knees, hands, side, breast, heart and face; in each, Biblical words referring to the limb frame verses of the hymn's text.

== Structure ==
Each cantata in Membra Jesu nostri is divided into six sections; an instrumental introduction; a concerto for instruments and five voices (SSATB), with the exception of the fifth and sixth cantatas where only three voices are used; three arias for one or three voices, each followed by an instrumental ritornello; and an exact reprise of the concerto. The first and the last cantata of the cycle deviate from this pattern. In the first cantata the choir repeats the first aria after the reprise, in the last one, Ad faciem, 5 parts sing the last aria, and then a final Amen instead of the reprise concludes the cycle.

The structure of Membra is dictated by its text. Buxtehude selected biblical verses for the concertos, and three strophes from each part of the poem Salve mundi salutare for the arias in each cantata. The biblical words are chosen for mentioning the member of the cantata and taken mostly from the Old Testament. The metre of the poetry unifies the arias' rhythmic patterns.

Example 1 (in bold are stressed syllables):

I Ad pedes:
Sal-ve mun-di sa-lu-ta-re

II Ad genua:
Quid sum ti-bi re-spon-su-rus

III Ad manus:
In cru-o-re tu-o lo-tum

V Ad pectus:
Pec-tus mi-hi con-fer mun-dum

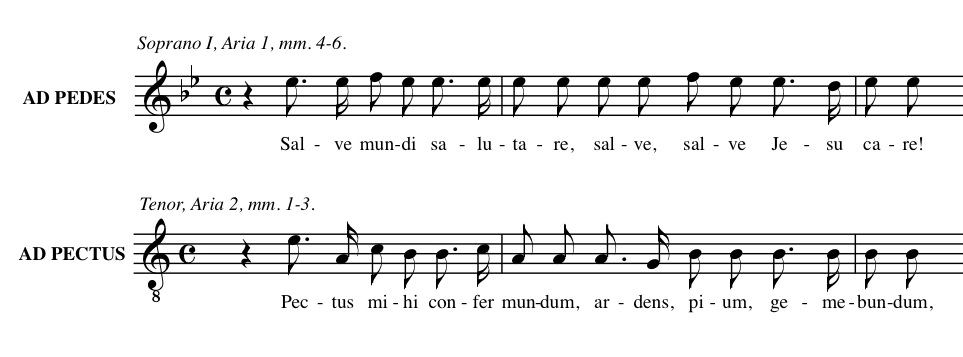
Rhythmic similarities between sections

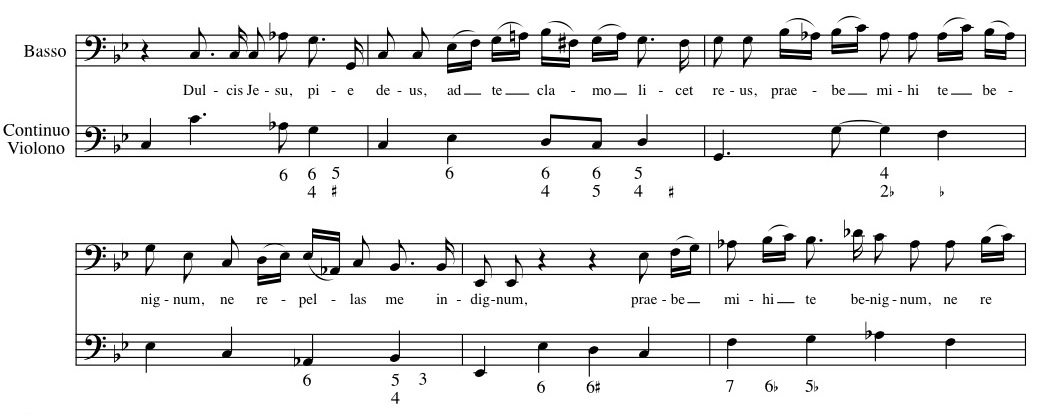
Sample: Ad pedes, 5. Aria

== Scoring ==
Membra Jesu nostri is scored for five voices SSATB, two violins, consort of viols, and a basso continuo of double bass, theorbo, and organ. The voices sing solos, duets, trios, and as a choir. The viols play in the sixth cantata only, with the middle two choir voices removed. In the table, S2 refers to the second soprano. For each "concerto" section, the Biblical text source is given; for the arias, it is always Salve mundi salutare.

Movements of Buxtehude's Membra Jesu Nostri
No.	Title	Translation	Voices	Instruments	Text source
I	Ad pedes	To the feet	SSATB; arias: S S2 B	2 violins	Nahum 1:15
II	Ad genua	To the knees	SSATB; arias: T A SSB	2 violins	Isaiah 66:12
III	Ad manus	To the hands	SSATB; arias: S S2 ATB	2 violins	Zechariah 13:6
IV	Ad latus	To the side	SSATB; arias: S ATB S2	2 violins	Song of Solomon 2:13–14
V	Ad pectus	To the breast	SSATB; arias: A T B	2 violins	1 Peter 2:2–3
VI	Ad cor	To the heart	SSB; arias: S S2 B	viol consort	Song of Solomon 4:9
VII	Ad faciem	To the face	SSATB; arias: ATB A SSATB	2 violins	Psalms 31:17

== Texts ==
=== I Ad pedes ===
(To the feet)

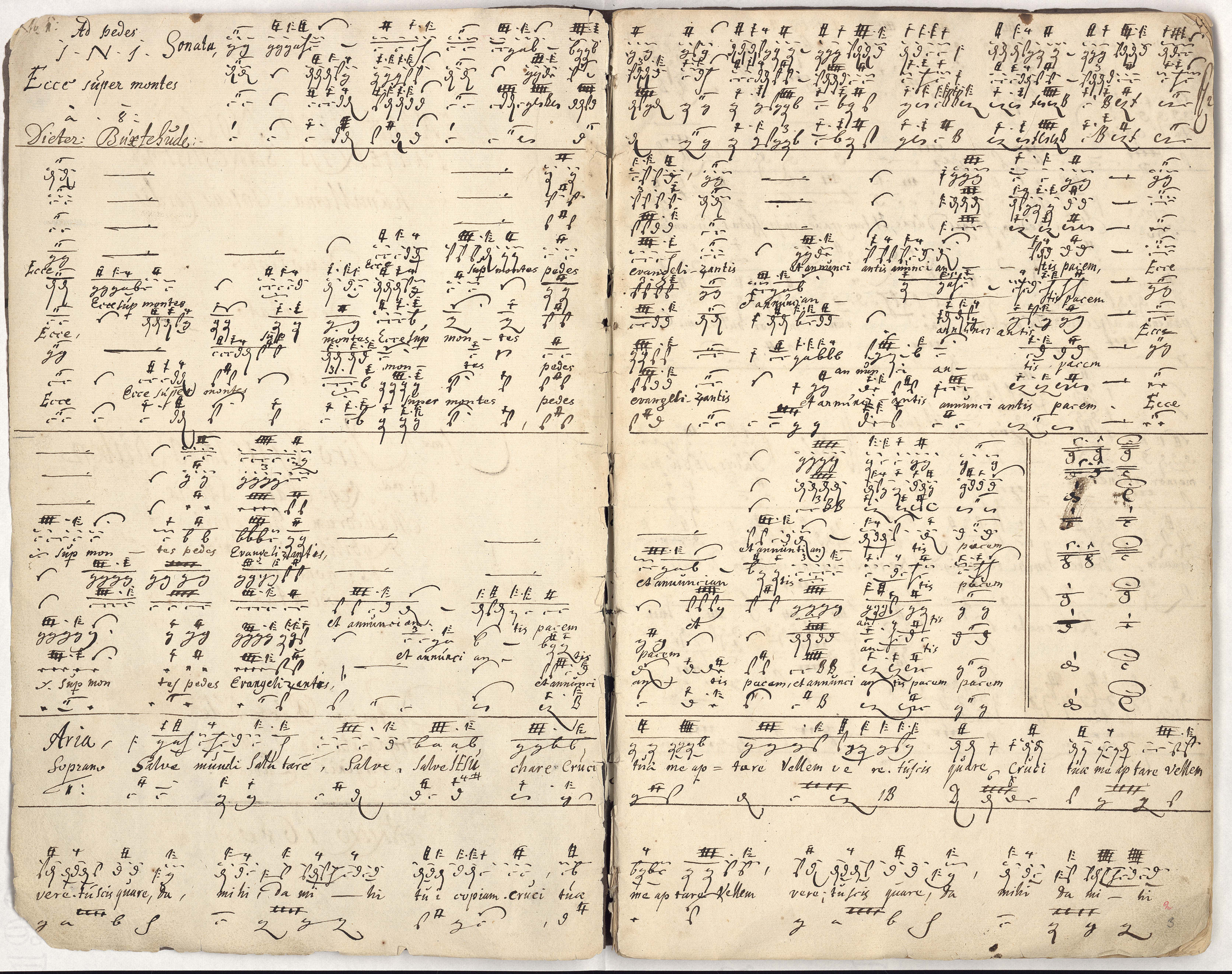
First page of original manuscript of Ad pedes in tablature notation

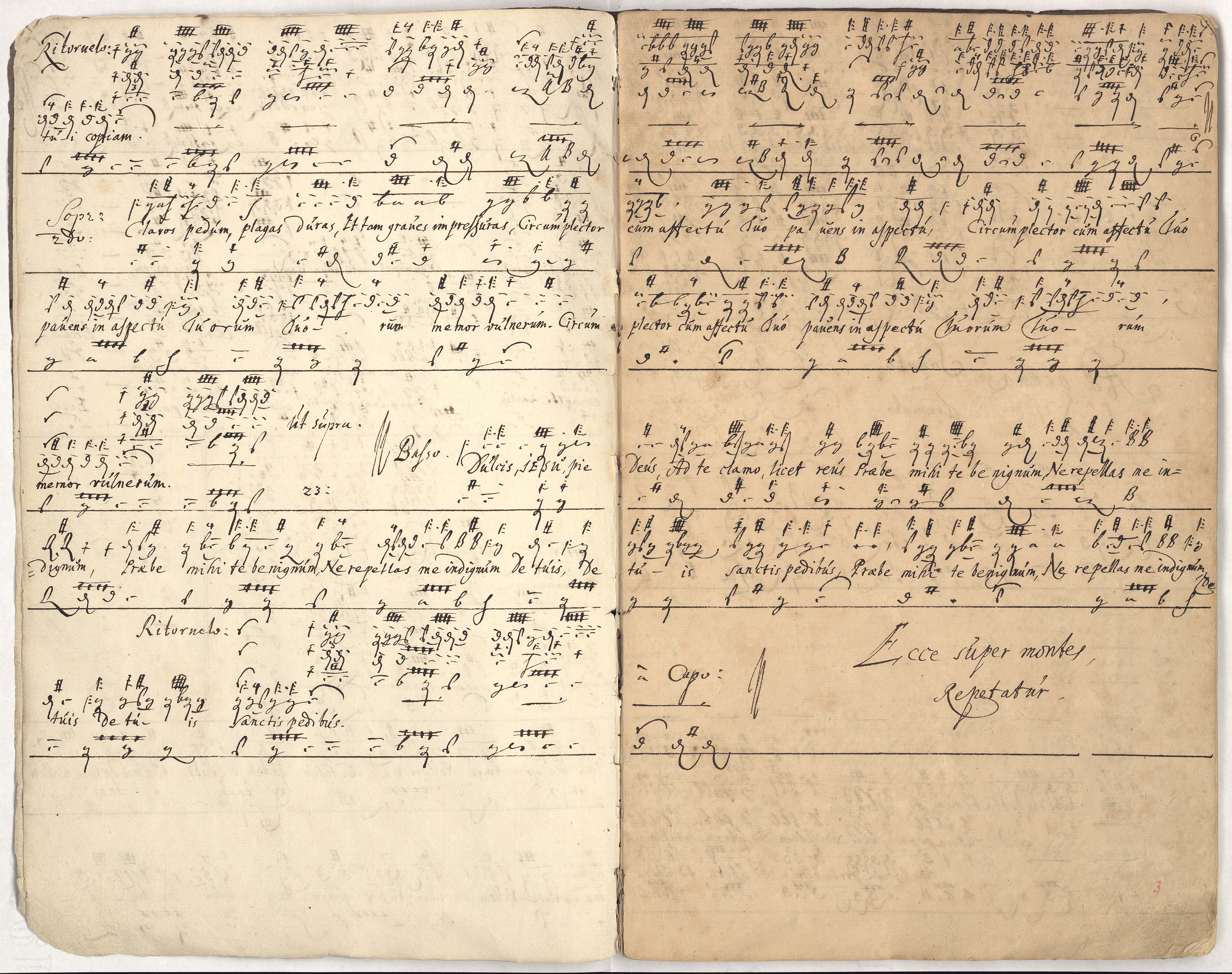
Second page of original manuscript of Ad pedes in tablature notation

1 Sonata (instrumental introduction)
2 Concerto (SSATB)
Ecce super montes pedes evangelizantis et annunciantis pacem	Behold, upon the mountains the feet of one bringing good news and proclaiming peace.
3 Aria (S I)
Salve mundi salutare, salve, salve Jesu care! Cruci tuae me aptare vellem vere, tu scis quare, da mihi tui copiam.	Hail, salvation of the world, Hail, hail, dear Jesus! On Your cross would I hang Truly, You know why Give me Your strength.
4 Aria (S II)
Clavos pedum, plagas duras, et tam graves impressuras circumplector cum affectu, tuo pavens in aspectu, tuorum memor vulnerum	The nails in Your feet, the hard blows and so grievous marks I embrace with love, Fearful at the sight of You Mindful of Your wounds.
5 Aria (B)
Dulcis Jesu, pie Deus, Ad te clamo licet reus, praebe mihi te benignum, ne repellas me indignum de tuis sanctis pedibus.	Sweet Jesus, merciful God I cry to You, in my guilt Show me Your grace, Turn me not unworthy away From Your sacred feet.
6 Concerto (da capo: Ecce super montes)
7 Concerto (SSATB)
Salve mundi salutare, salve Jesu care! Cruci tuae me aptare vellem vere, tu scis quare, da mihi tui copiam.	Hail, salvation of the world, Hail, hail, dear Jesus! On Your cross would I hang Truly, You know why Give me Your strength.

=== II Ad genua ===
(To the knees)

1 Sonata
2 Concerto (SSATB)
Ad ubera portabimini, et super genua blandientur vobis.	You will be brought to nurse and dandled on the knees [of Jerusalem, portrayed as a mother].
3 Aria (T)
Salve Jesu, rex sanctorum, spes votiva peccatorum, crucis ligno tanquam reus, pendens homo verus Deus, caducis nutans genibus.	Hail Jesus, King of Saints Hope of sinners' prayers, like an offender on the wood of the cross, a man hanging, true God, Bending on failing knees!
4 Aria (A)
Quid sum tibi responsurus, actu vilis corde durus? Quid rependam amatori, qui elegit pro me mori, ne dupla morte morerer.	What answer shall I give You, Vile as I am in deed, hard in my heart? How shall I repay Your love, Who chose to die for me Lest I die the second death?
5 Aria (SSB)
Ut te quaeram mente pura, sit haec mea prima cura, non est labor et gravabor, sed sanabor et mundabor, cum te complexus fuero.	That I may seek You with pure heart, Be my first care, It is no labour nor shall I be loaded down: But I shall be cleansed, When I embrace You.
6 Concerto (da capo: Ad ubera portabimini)

=== III Ad manus ===
(To the hands)

1 Sonata
2 Concerto (SSATB)
Quid sunt plagae istae in medio manuum tuarum?	What are those wounds in the midst of Your hands?
3 Aria (S I)
Salve Jesu, pastor bone, fatigatus in agone, qui per lignum es distractus et ad lignum es compactus expansis sanctis manibus.	Hail, Jesus, good shepherd, wearied in agony, tormented on the cross nailed to the cross Your sacred hands stretched out.
4 Aria (S II)
Manus sanctae, vos amplector, et gemendo condelector, grates ago plagis tantis, clavis duris guttis sanctis dans lacrymas cum osculis.	Holy hands, I embrace you, and, lamenting, I delight in you, I give thanks for the terrible wounds, the hard nails, the holy drops, shedding tears with kisses.
5 Aria (ATB)
In cruore tuo lotum me commendo tibi totum, tuae sanctae manus istae me defendant, Jesu Christe, extremis in periculis.	Washed in Your blood I wholly entrust myself to You; may these holy hands of Yours defend me, Jesus Christ, in the final dangers.
6 Concerto (da capo: Quid sunt plagae istae)

=== IV Ad latus ===
(To the sides)

1 Sonata
2 Concerto (SSATB)
Surge, amica mea, speciosa mea, et veni, columba mea in foraminibus petrae, in caverna maceriae.	Arise, my love, my beautiful one, and come, my dove in the clefts of the rock, in the hollow of the cliff.
3 Aria (S I)
Salve latus salvatoris, in quo latet mel dulcoris, in quo patet vis amoris, ex quo scatet fons cruoris, qui corda lavat sordida.	Hail, side of the Saviour, in which the honey of sweetness is hidden, in which the power of love is exposed, from which gushes the spring of blood that cleans the dirty hearts.
4 Aria (ATB)
Ecce tibi appropinquo, parce, Jesu, si delinquo, verecunda quidem fronte, ad te tamen veni sponte scrutari tua vulnera.	Lo I approach You, Pardon, Jesus, if I sin, With reverent countenance freely I come to You to behold Your wounds.
5 Aria (S II)
Hora mortis meus flatus intret Jesu, tuum latus, hinc expirans in te vadat, ne hunc leo trux invadat, sed apud te permaneat.	In the hour of death, may my soul Enter, Jesus, Your side Hence dying may it go into You, Lest the cruel lion seize it, But let it dwell with You.
6 Concerto (da capo: Surge amica mea)

=== V Ad pectus ===
(To the breast)

1 Sonata
2 Concerto a 3 voci (in 3 voices: ATB)
Sicut modo geniti infantes rationabiles, et sine dolo concupiscite, ut in eo crescatis in salutem. Si tamen gustatis, quoniam dulcis est Dominus.	Like newborn infants, long for the guileless milk of reason, that by it you may grow into salvation, if indeed you have tasted that the Lord is good.
3 Aria (A)
Salve, salus mea, Deus, Jesu dulcis, amor meus, salve, pectus reverendum, cum tremore contingendum, amoris domicilium.	Hail God, my salvation, sweet Jesus, my beloved, hail, breast to be revered, to be touched with trembling, dwelling of love.
4 Aria (T)
Pectus mihi confer mundum, ardens, pium, gemebundum, voluntatem abnegatam, tibi semper conformatam, juncta virtutum copia.	Give me a clean breast, ardent, pious, moaning, an abnegated will, always conforming to You, with an abundance of virtues.
5 Aria (B)
Ave, verum templum Dei, precor miserere mei, tu totius arca boni, fac electis me apponi, vas dives Deus omnium.	Hail, true temple of God, I pray, have mercy on me, You, the ark of all that is good, make me be placed with the chosen, rich vessel, God of all.
6 Concerto a 3 voci (da capo: Sicut modo geniti)

=== VI Ad cor ===
(To the heart)

In this part a consort of violas da gamba replaces the violins.

1 Sonata
2 Concerto a 3 voci (SSB)
Vulnerasti cor meum, soror mea, sponsa, vulnerasti cor meum.	You have wounded my heart, my sister, my bride, You have wounded my heart.
3 Aria (S I)
Summi regis cor, aveto, te saluto corde laeto, te complecti me delectat et hoc meum cor affectat, ut ad te loquar, animes.	Heart of the highest king, I greet You, I salute You with a joyous heart, it delights me to embrace You and my heart aspires to this: that You move me to speak to You.
4 Aria (S II)
Per medullam cordis mei, peccatoris atque rei, tuus amor transferatur, quo cor tuum rapiatur languens amoris vulnere.	Through the marrow of my heart, of a sinner and culprit, may Your love be conveyed by whom Your heart was seized, languishing through the wound of love.
5 Aria (B)
Viva cordis voce clamo, dulce cor, te namque amo, ad cor meum inclinare, ut se possit applicare devoto tibi pectore.	I call with the living voice of the heart, sweet heart, for I love You, to incline to my heart, so that it may commit itself to you in the breast devoted to You.
6 Concerto a 3 voci (da capo: Vulnerasti cor meum)

=== VII Ad faciem ===
(To the face)

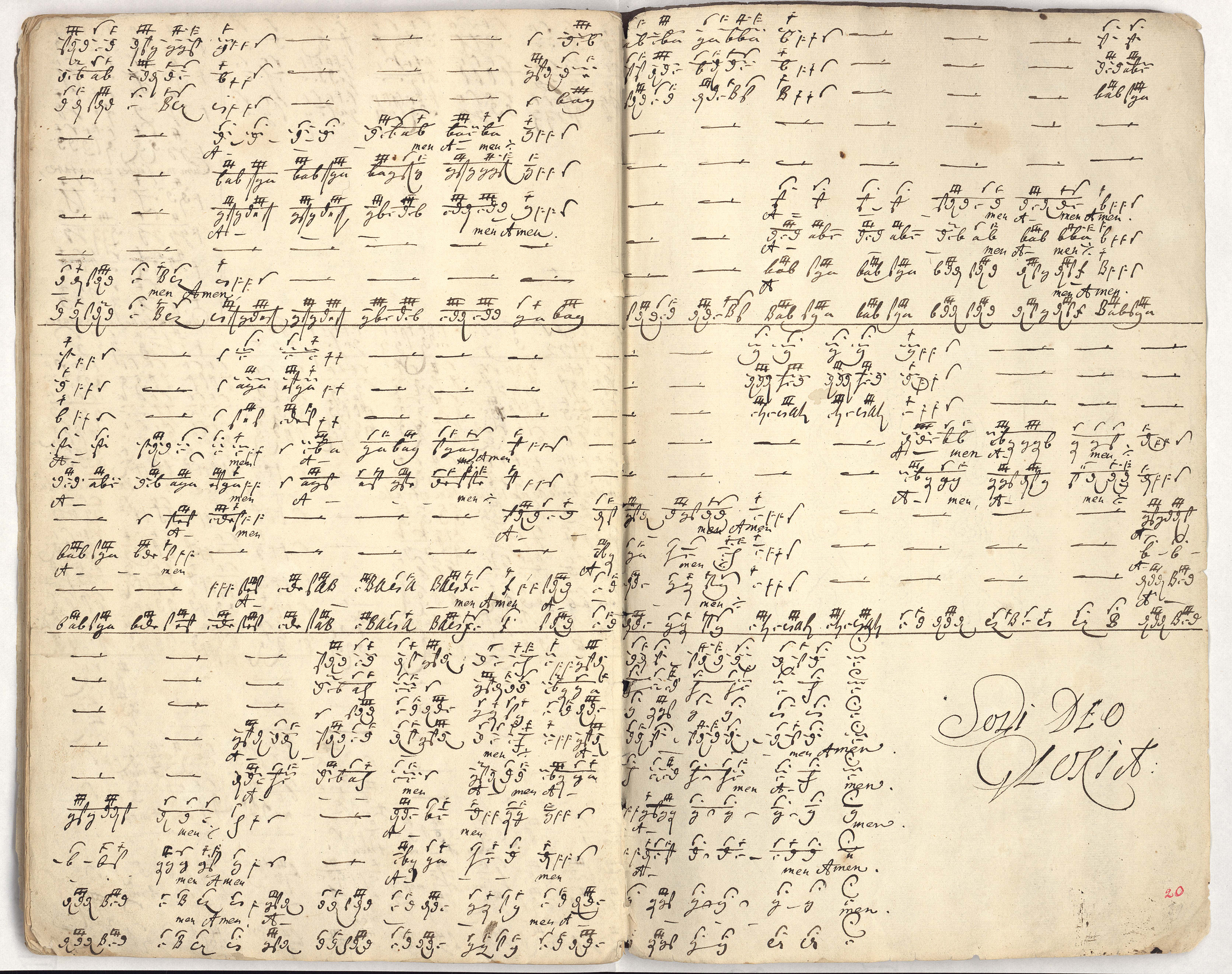
Original manuscript of the Amen at the close of Ad faciem in tablature notation, marked Soli Deo gloria at the end

1 Sonata
2 Concerto (SSATB)
Illustra faciem tuam super servum tuum, salvum me fac in misericordia tua.	Let Your face shine upon Your servant, save me in Your mercy.
3 Aria (ATB)
Salve, caput cruentatum, totum spinis coronatum, conquassatum, vulneratum, arundine verberatum facie sputis illita.	Hail, bloodied head, all crowned with thorns, beaten, wounded, struck with a cane, the face soiled with spit.
4 Aria (A)
Dum me mori est necesse, noli mihi tunc deesse, in tremenda mortis hora veni, Jesu, absque mora, tuere me et libera.	When I must die, do not then be away from me, in the anxious hour of death come, Jesus, without delay, protect me and set me free!
5 Aria (SSATB)
Cum me jubes emigrare, Jesu care, tunc appare, o amator amplectende, temet ipsum tunc ostende in cruce salutifera.	When You command me to depart, dear Jesus, then appear, O lover to be embraced, then show Yourself on the cross that brings salvation.
6 Concerto (SSATB)
Amen

== Recordings ==
- Jan–Feb 1987 – Ton Koopman; Schlick sI, Frimmer sII, Chance a, Prégardien t, Kooy b; Hannover Knabenchor – Erato ECD 75378
- Sept 1988 – John Eliot Gardiner; Monteverdi Choir, English Baroque Soloists – Archiv 447 298–2
- March 4, 1994 – Diego Fasolis; Caterina Trogu soprano I, Roberta Invernizzi soprano II, Roberto Balconi alto, Mario Cecchetti tenor, Daniele Carnovich bass; Choir of Radio Svizzera Lugano, Sonatori della Gioiosa Marca, Accademia Strumentale Italiana Verona – Naxos 8.553787
- 1997 – Masaaki Suzuki; Yoshie Hida, Midori Suzuki, Aki Yanagisawa and Yuko Anazawa sopranos, Yoshikazu Mera alto, Makoto Sakurada tenor, Yoshitaka Ogasawara bass; Bach Collegium Japan – BIS CD-871
- 1999 – Erik van Nevel; Johannette Zomer soprano I, Anne-Marie Buyle soprano II, Vincent Darras alto, Jan Caals tenor, Conor Biggs bass; Capella Currende, Currende Consort – Eufoda CD 1294
- 2000 – Harry Christophers; Carolyn Sampson soprano I, Libby Crabtree soprano II, Robin Blaze alto, James Gilchrist tenor, Simon Birchall bass; soloists serve as choir, The Sixteen – Chandos CKD 141
- 2003 – René Jacobs; María Cristina Kiehr soprano I, Rosa Dominguez soprano II, Andreas Scholl alto, Gerd Türk tenor, Ulrich Messenthaler bass; soloists serve as choir, Concerto Vocale – Harmonia Mundi; this recording served as the soundtrack of a later DVD
- 2005 – Konrad Junghänel; Cantus Cölln – Harmonia Mundi HMC 901912
- 2005 – Jos van Veldhoven; Anne Grimm soprano I, Johannette Zomer soprano II, Peter de Groot alto, Andrew Tortise tenor, Bas Ramselaar bass; soloists serve as choir, Netherlands Bach Society – Channel Classics CCS SA 24006
- Dec 3–5, 2009 – Emma Kirkby, Elin Manahan Thomas sopranos, Michael Chance counter-tenor, Charles Daniels tenor, Peter Harvey bass, Purcell Quartet (Catherine Mackintosh violin, et al.), Fretwork (Richard Campbell great bass viol, et al.) – Chaconne CHAN 0775
- Nov 10–12, 2010 – Sigiswald Kuijken; La Petite Bande – Accent ACC 24243
- 2014 – Daniel Hyde; Robin Blaze alto, John Mark Ainsley tenor, Giles Underwood bass; Choir of Magdalen College, Oxford, viol consort Phantasm – Opus Arte OACD 9023-D
- 2018 – Philippe Pierlot; Hanna Bayodi soprano I, Maria Keohane soprano II, Carlos Mena alto, Jeffrey Thompson tenor, Matthias Vieweg bass; Ricercar Consort – Mirare MIR 444
- March 10–15, 2021 – Tymen Jan Bronda; Witmer sI, Caihuela sII, Kullmann a, Knight t, Baker b; Luthers Bach Ensemble – Brilliant Classics
