= Bogna Bartosz =

Polish classical mezzo-soprano and alto

- Born: Gdańsk
- Education: Academy of Music in Gdansk, Berlin University of the Arts
- Occupation: Classical mezzo-soprano
- Spouse: Winfried Petzold
- Awards: International Bach Competition

Bogna Bartosz is a Polish-German classical mezzo-soprano and alto. She lives in Berlin.

== Life and career ==
Bartosz was born in Gdańsk. She studied voice at the Academy of Music in Gdansk and graduated with distinction. She then studied at the Berlin University of the Arts with Ingrid Figur and in master-classes with Aribert Reimann, Adele Stolte and Anna Reynolds.

As a Baroque specialist she has worked with Philippe Herreweghe, Musica Antiqua Köln and Ton Koopman, taking part in his project to record the complete vocal works of Johann Sebastian Bach with the Amsterdam Baroque Orchestra & Choir. She is also involved in the project Dieterich Buxtehude – Opera Omnia of the same ensemble to record the complete works of Dieterich Buxtehude.

She has performed with orchestras such as the Leipzig Gewandhaus Orchestra, Israel Chamber Orchestra Tel Aviv and Japan Philharmonic Orchestra under conductors such as Moshe Atzmon, Enoch zu Guttenberg, Krzysztof Penderecki and Helmuth Rilling.

In 1992, Bartosz was awarded 1st Prize for singing at the International Bach Competition of Leipzig.

Bartosz is married to the German conductor Winfried Petzold.
