= Daniel Taylor (countertenor) =

Canadian opera singer (born 1969)

Daniel John Taylor OC (born November 1969) is a Canadian countertenor, conductor, and early music specialist. Recognised for his work on stage and screen, has received numerous accolades, including major international awards. Taylor directs the Trinity Choir, the Theatre of Early Music, and is Professor of Opera, Voice, and Early Music at the University of Toronto. He is the General and Artistic director of the Toronto Consort.

== Life and career ==
Taylor completed undergraduate studies in English, philosophy, and music at the Faculty of Music of McGill University in Montreal, and graduate studies in religion and music at the Université de Montréal. He later studied at the Royal Academy of Music and the Royal College of Music in London with baroque specialists, including countertenor Michael Chance.

Taylor's debut at the Glyndebourne Festival Opera in the 1997 Peter Sellars production of Handel's Theodora was followed by his operatic debut in Rodelinda, directed by Jonathan Miller. His roles have included Nerone in Monteverdi's L'incoronazione di Poppea, Hamor in Handel's Jephtha, Oberon in Britten's A Midsummer Night’s Dream, Orfeo in Gluck's Orfeo ed Euridice, and Tolomeo in Handel’s Giulio Cesare. His repertoire spans sacred works, lute songs, and contemporary compositions.

He has appeared with major opera houses and ensembles, including the Metropolitan Opera, San Francisco Opera, Canadian Opera Company, Opera North, Welsh National Opera, Rome Opera, and Munich Opera. His collaborations include performances with the Gabrieli Consort, Monteverdi Choir, English Baroque Soloists, Amsterdam Baroque Orchestra & Choir, Les Arts Florissants, Academy of Ancient Music, Fretwork, the King's Consort, Philharmonia Baroque Orchestra, Bach Collegium Japan, and the Akademie für Alte Musik Berlin. Taylor has made more than 120 recordings across labels such as Deutsche Grammophon Archiv, Harmonia Mundi, Sony, EMI, Carus, Analekta, Teldec, Atma, and CBC.

He participated in the Bach Cantata Pilgrimage with Sir John Eliot Gardiner, performing and recording the complete sacred cantatas of J.S. Bach at historic venues across Europe. He also recorded Bach’s Mass in B minor with John Nelson and the Ensemble Orchestral de Paris at Notre Dame and with Kammerchor Stuttgart under Frieder Bernius. He took part in Dieterich Buxtehude – Opera Omnia with Ton Koopman and the Amsterdam Baroque Orchestra & Choir.

He has appeared with the New York Philharmonic, Madrid Symphony, San Francisco Symphony, Rotterdam Philharmonic, Cleveland Orchestra, and Israel Philharmonic. Recital engagements include appearances at Wigmore Hall, the Teatro Colón in Buenos Aires, Carnegie Hall, Avery Fisher Hall, and the Forbidden City Concert Hall in Beijing. His discography includes collaborations with actors Ralph Fiennes and Jeremy Irons, and projects with Cirque du Soleil. With Ryuichi Sakamoto, he toured and recorded the Opera 'Life' (selling more than 10 million copies/winner of the Asia Pacific Screen Award) in a project that featured Pina Bausch, Bernardo Bertolucci, Josep Carreras, Salif Keita, the Dalai Lama and Salman Rushdie.

Taylor previously taught at the University of Ottawa and McGill University. He is director of musical studies, head of early music and professor of voice at the University of Toronto. He has taught master classes at institutions including Guildhall, the Royal Academy of Music, the Royal College of Music, and conservatories across North America and Europe.

== Awards and honours ==
Taylor has received numerous awards and honors throughout his career:

- Grammy Award – for his contributions to early music recordings
- Gramophone Award – recognizing excellence in classical music
- Juno Award – for outstanding Canadian classical performance
- Diapason d'Or – prestigious French recording award
- BBC Music Award – honouring his vocal achievements
- ADISQ Award – recognition from Quebec's music industry
- Opus Prize – Discovery of the Year and Artist of the Year
- Queen's Jubilee Medal – for contributions to Canadian music
- National Medal for Music – for his national impact on music
- Officer of the Order of Canada (2021) – one of Canada's highest civilian honours

== Advocacy and Political Views ==
Taylor has worked with the Feed the Children Foundation and traveled to Africa as part of a mission focussed on health and education. He is the first musician in Canadian history to both sing and lead the orchestra and choir in a State Funeral - the event was a tribute to the life of the Honourable Ed Broadbent and to Social Democracy.

== Personal life ==
Taylor is married and has three children.
