= Johannette Zomer =

Dutch classical concert and opera soprano

- Born: March 13, 1964 (age 61)
- Education: Sweelinck Conservatory Amsterdam
- Occupation: Classical soprano
- Organization: Hochschule für Musik Saar

Johannette Zomer (born March 13, 1964) is a Dutch classical concert and opera soprano.

== Career ==
After having worked as a microbiology technician, Johannette Zomer shifted gears in 1990 and studied voice at the Sweelinck Conservatory Amsterdam in Amsterdam with Charles van Tassel, where she received her Performance Diploma in 1997.

As a Baroque specialist, she has worked with Frans Brüggen, Reinhard Goebel, Philippe Herreweghe, René Jacobs, Sigiswald Kuijken, Paul McCreesh and Jos van Veldhoven. She took part in the project of Ton Koopman to record the complete vocal works of Johann Sebastian Bach with the Amsterdam Baroque Orchestra & Choir and is engaged also in the ongoing project Dieterich Buxtehude – Opera Omnia to record the complete works of Dieterich Buxtehude. She has also collaborated with the ensemble Florilegium.

As a recitalist, she has performed with the pianist Bart van de Roer, the fortepiano specialist Arthur Schoonderwoerd and the theorbo player Fred Jacobs.

She has appeared on the opera stage since 1996 as Pamina in Mozart's The Magic Flute, as Euridice both in Monteverdi’s L'Orfeo and Haydn’s L'anima del filosofo, and as Mélisande in Debussy’s Pelléas et Mélisande.

In 2007 she performed at the Tanglewood Festival Bach's Mass in B Minor with the Netherlands Bach Society, conducted by Jos van Veldhoven.
