= Caroline Stam =

Dutch classical soprano

- Education: Sweelinck Conservatory Amsterdam
- Occupation: Classical soprano

Caroline Stam is a Dutch classical soprano who has an international (European) performing career specializing in baroque repertoire, reinforced by a distinguished presence in modern recordings (see below).

== Education ==
Stam studied voice at the Sweelinck Conservatory Amsterdam with Erna Spoorenberg, graduated with honours, and continued in master classes with Elly Ameling.

== Career ==
Stam has performed in recital in Germany, France, Spain and Great Britain with conductors such as Iván Fischer, David Willcocks and Ton Koopman. She appeared at the Festivals La Folle Journée in Nantes and the Bremer Bachfest. In 1995 she won first prize at the Grimsby International Competition in the categories Soprano as well as interpretation of French Lieder.

On the opera stage she appeared as Pamina in Mozart's The Magic Flute, Clarijn in Der Spiegel von Venedig of Hendrik Andriessen, Ninfa in Monteverdi's L'Orfeo, Belinda in Purcell's Dido and Aeneas, Dorinda in Handel's Orlando and Hélène in Chabrier's Une éducation manquée. She performs baroque oratorio and passion-music often, for instance (2009) Bach's Christmas Oratorio, St Matthew Passion and St John Passion, Handel's Messiah, Israel in Egypt and Jephtha, and Classical works including Haydn's The Creation and Theresienmesse but also Romantic repertoire such as Brahms's Ein Deutsches Requiem.

Stam sang as soloist in several sections of the project of Ton Koopman to record the complete vocal works of Johann Sebastian Bach with the Amsterdam Baroque Orchestra & Choir, herself a member of the choir since it was founded in 1992. With them she had a part in the 1994 recording of Henry Purcell's opera The Fairy-Queen. She is the principal soprano in Jos van Veldhoven's recording of the Bach St. John Passion with the Netherlands Bach Society. In 2001, with the Utrecht Barok Consort under van Veldhoven at Utrecht and Amsterdam, she gave performances of the rarely heard oratorio La Morte di Abele (1732) by the Neapolitan Leonardo Leo.

She records with Camerata Trajectina, for instance in Songs of Jacob Cats and Dutch Theatre Music 1600-1650, and with them took part in the 2006 recorded reconstruction of Johan Schenck's early opera Bacchus, Ceres & Venus, for Louis Peter Grijp. She is also a soloist in the ongoing project Dieterich Buxtehude – Opera Omnia with Koopman to record the complete works of Dieterich Buxtehude, and took part in the presentation of the oratorio attributed to him, Wacht! Euch zum Streit gefasset macht under Koopman's direction at the Holland Festival of Early Music at the Muziekcentrum Vredenburg for the Utrecht Festival in 2005. She also participated in Koopman's reconstruction of Bach's St Mark Passion.
