= List of compositions by Dieterich Buxtehude =

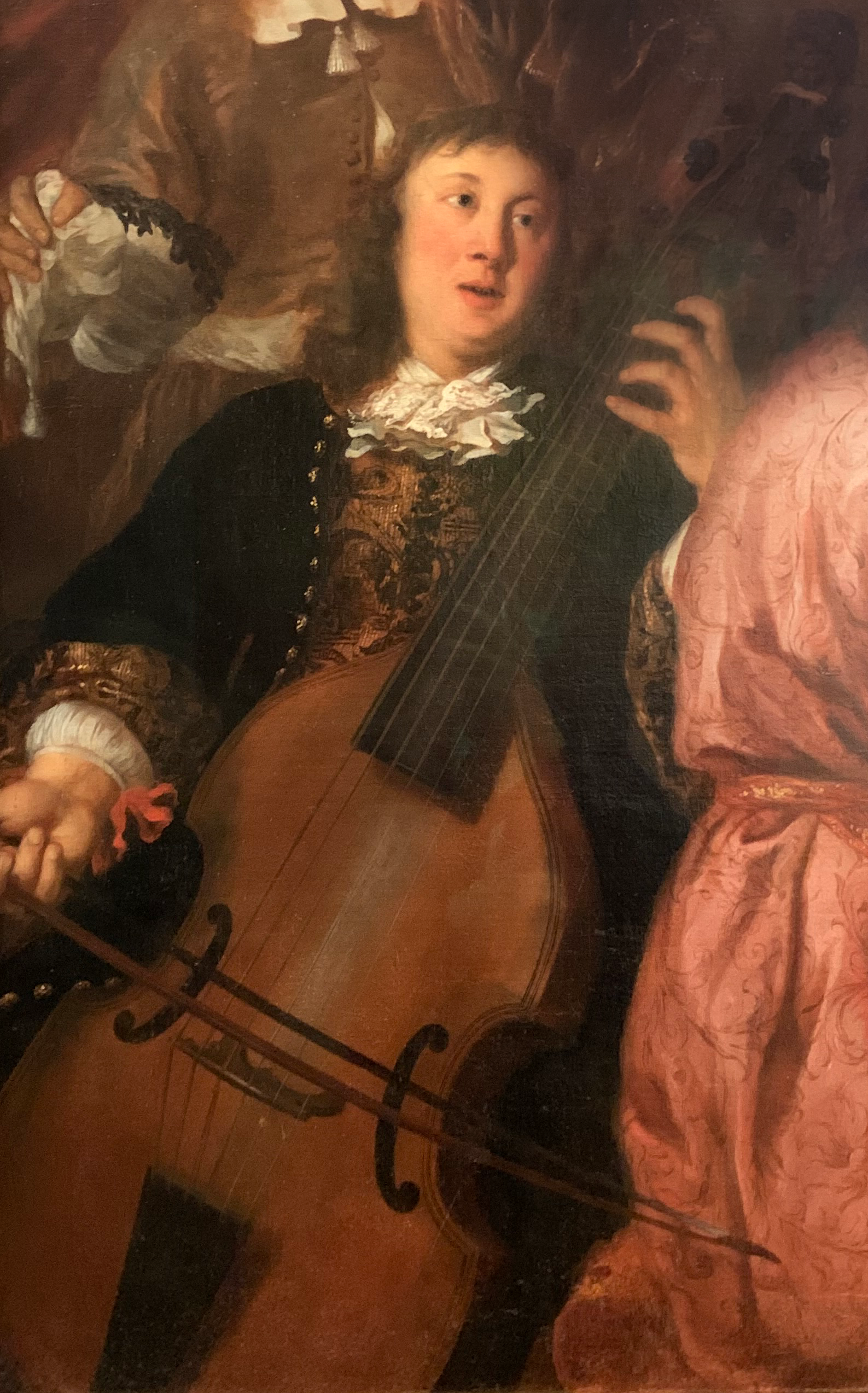
The only surviving portrait of Buxtehude, playing a viol, from A musical party by Johannes Voorhout (1674)

The Buxtehude-Werke-Verzeichnis ("Buxtehude Works Catalogue", commonly abbreviated to BuxWV) is the catalogue and the numbering system used to identify musical works by the German-Danish Baroque composer Dieterich Buxtehude (c. 1637 – 9 May 1707). It was compiled by Georg Karstädt and published in 1974 as Thematisch-Systematisches Verzeichnis der Musikalischen Werke von Dietrich Buxtehude. The second edition, published in 1985, contains minor additions and corrections. The catalogue is organized thematically, not chronologically, and contains 275 individual pieces. The Anhang ("Appendix") adds 13 spurious and falsely attributed works.

The fourteen trio sonatas (BuxWV 252–265) were the only works published during Buxtehude's lifetime. Originally issued in two volumes, the first seven are now commonly referred to as Buxtehude's opus 1 and the next seven as opus 2.

== Vocal music ==
=== Cantatas (1–112) ===
- BuxWV 1 — Accedite gentes, accurite populi
- BuxWV 2 — Afferte Domino gloriam honorem
- BuxWV 3 — All solch dein Güt wir preisen
- BuxWV 4 — Alles, was ihr tut mit Worten oder mit Werken
- BuxWV 5 — Also hat Gott die Welt geliebet
- BuxWV 6 — An filius non-est Dei, fons gratiae salus rei
- BuxWV 7 — Aperite mihi portas justitiae
- BuxWV 8 — Att du, Jesu, will mig höra
- BuxWV 9 — Bedenke, Mensch, das Ende, bedenke deinen Tod
- BuxWV 10 — Befiehl dem Engel, daß er komm
- BuxWV 11 — Canite Jesu nostro citharae, cymbala, organa
- BuxWV 12 — Cantate Domino canticum novum
- BuxWV 13 — Das neugeborne Kindelein, das herzeliebe Jesulein
- BuxWV 14 — Dein edles Herz, der Liebe Thron
- BuxWV 15 — Der Herr ist mit mir, darum fürchte ich mich nicht
- BuxWV 16 — Dies ist der Tag (lost)
- BuxWV 17 — Dixit Dominus Domino meo
- BuxWV 18 — Domine, savum fac regem et exaudi nos
- BuxWV 19 — Drei schöne Dinge sind
- BuxWV 20 — Du Friedefürst, Herr Jesu Christ
- BuxWV 21 — Du Friedefürst, Herr Jesu Christ
- BuxWV 22 — Du Lebensfürst, Herr Jesu Christ
- BuxWV 23 — Ecce nunc benedicite Domino
- BuxWV 24 — Eins bitte ich vom Herrn
- BuxWV 25 — Entreißt euch, meine Sinnen
- BuxWV 26 — Erfreue dich, Erde! Du Himmel erschall!
- BuxWV 27 — Erhalt uns, Herr, bei deinem Wort after Luther's hymn
- BuxWV 28 — Fallax mundus ornat vultus
- BuxWV 29 — Frohlocket mit Händen
- BuxWV 30 — Fürchtet euch nicht, siehe ich verkündige euch große Freude
- BuxWV 31 — Fürwahr, er trug unsere Krankheit
- BuxWV 32 — Gen Himmel zu dem Vater mein
- BuxWV 33 — Gott fähret auf mit Jauchzen
- BuxWV 34 — Gott hilf mir, denn das Wasser geht mir bis an die Seele
- BuxWV 35 — Herr, auf dich traue ich
- BuxWV 36 — Herr, ich lasse dich nicht
- BuxWV 37 — Herr, nun läßt du deinen Diener in Frieden fahren
- BuxWV 38 — Herr, wenn ich nur dich hab
- BuxWV 39 — Herr, wenn ich nur dich habe
- BuxWV 40 — Herren var Gud – Der Herr erhöre dich
- BuxWV 41 — Herzlich lieb hab ich dich, o Herr on Schalling's hymn
- BuxWV 42 — Herzlich tut mich verlangen
- BuxWV 43 — Heut triumphieret Gottes Sohn on the hymn by with a tune by Bartholomäus Gesius
- BuxWV 44 — Ich bin die Auferstehung und das Leben
- BuxWV 45 — Ich bin eine Blume zu Saron
- BuxWV 46 — Ich habe Lust abzuscheiden
- BuxWV 47 — Ich habe Lust abzuscheiden
- BuxWV 48 — Ich halte es dafür, daß dieser Zeit Leiden der Herrlichkeit nicht wert sei
- BuxWV 49 — Ich sprach in meinem Herzen
- BuxWV 50 — Ich suchte des Nachts in meinem Bette
- BuxWV 51 — Ihr lieben Christen, freut euch nun
- BuxWV 52 — In dulci jubilo, nun singet und seid froh!
- BuxWV 53 — In te, Domine, speravi. Non confundat in aeternum
- BuxWV 54 — Ist es recht, daß man dem Kaiser Zinse gebe oder nicht?
- BuxWV 55 — Je höher du bist, je mehr dich demütige
- BuxWV 56 — Jesu dulcis memoria
- BuxWV 57 — Jesu dulcis memoria
- BuxWV 58 — Jesu komm mein Trost und Lachen
- BuxWV 59 — Jesu meine Freud und Lust
- BuxWV 60 — Jesu meine Freude, meines Herzens Weide on Franck's hymn
- BuxWV 61 — Jesu, meiner Freuden Meister
- BuxWV 62 — Jesu, meines Lebens Leben
- BuxWV 63 — Jesulein, du Tausendschön, Blümlein aus dem Himmelsgarten
- BuxWV 64 — Jubilate Domino, omnis terra
- BuxWV 65 — Klinget mit Freuden, ihr klaron Klarinen
- BuxWV 66 — Kommst du, Licht der Heiden
- BuxWV 67 — Lauda anima mea Dominum
- BuxWV 68 — Lauda Sion Salvatorem
- BuxWV 69 — Laudate pueri, Dominum, laudate nomen Domini
- BuxWV 70 — Liebster, meine Seele saget mit durchaus verliebtem Sinn
- BuxWV 71 — Lobe den Herrn, meine Seele
- BuxWV 72 — Mein Gemüt erfreuet sich
- BuxWV 73 — Mein Herz ist bereit, Gott, daß ich singe und lobe
- BuxWV 74 — Meine Seele, willtu ruhn
- BuxWV 75 — Membra Jesu Nostri (a collection of seven cantatas)
  - BuxWV 75a — Ad pedes: Ecce super montes
  - BuxWV 75b — Ad genua: Ad ubera portabimini
  - BuxWV 75c — Ad manus: Quid sunt plagae istae
  - BuxWV 75d — Ad latus: Surge amica mea
  - BuxWV 75e — Ad pectus: Sicut modo geniti infantes
  - BuxWV 75f — Ad cor: Vulnerasti cor meum
  - BuxWV 75g — Ad faciem: Illustra faciem tuam
- BuxWV 76 — Fried- und Freudenreiche Hinfarth (a collection of two cantatas)
  - BuxWV 76a — Mit Fried und Freud (on Luther's hymn)
  - BuxWV 76b — Klag-Lied: Muß der Tod denn auch entbinden
- BuxWV 77 — Nichts soll uns scheiden von der Liebe Gottes
- BuxWV 78 — Nimm von uns, Herr, du treuer Gott
- BuxWV — Nun danket alle Gott
- BuxWV 80 — Nun freut euch, ihr Frommen, mit nir
- BuxWV 81 — Nun laßt uns Gott dem Herren Dank sagen
- BuxWV 82 — O clemens, o mitis, o coelestis Pater
- BuxWV 83 — O dulcis Jesu, o amor cordis mei
- BuxWV 84 — O fröhliche Stunden, o fröhliche Zeit
- BuxWV 85 — O fröhliche Stunden, o herrliche Zeit
- BuxWV 86 — O Gott, wir danken deiner Güt'
- BuxWV 87 — O Gottes Stadt, o güldnes Licht
- BuxWV 88 — O Jesu mi dulcissime
- BuxWV 89 — O lux beata Trinitas et principalis unitas
- BuxWV 90 — O wie selig sind, die zu dem Abendmahl des Lammes berufen sind
- BuxWV 91 — Pange lingua gloriosi, corporis mysterium
- BuxWV 92 — Quemadmodum desiderat cervus
- BuxWV 93 — Salve desiderium, salve clamor gentium
- BuxWV 94 — Salve, Jesu, Patris gnate unigenite
- BuxWV 95 — Schaffe in mir, Gott, ein rein Herz
- BuxWV 96 — Schwinget euch himmelan, Herzen und Sinnen (Lübeck-Kantate)
- BuxWV 97 — Sicut Moses exaltavit serpentem
- BuxWV 98 — Singet dem Herren ein neues Lied
- BuxWV 99 — Surrexit Christus hodie
- BuxWV 100 — Wachet auf, ruft uns die Stimme
- BuxWV 101 — Wachet auf, ruft uns die Stimme
- BuxWV 102 — Wär Gott nicht mit uns diese Zeit on Luther's hymn
- BuxWV 103 — Walts Gott, mein Werk ich lasse
- BuxWV 104 — Was frag ich nach der Welt und allen ihren Schätzen
- BuxWV 105 — Was mich auf dieser Welt betrübt
- BuxWV 106 — Welt packe dich, ich sehne mich nur nach dem Himmel
- BuxWV 107 — Wenn ich, Herr Jesu, habe dich
- BuxWV 108 — Wie schmekt es so lieblich und wohl
- BuxWV 109 — Wie soll ich dich empfangen on Paul Gerhardt's hymn
- BuxWV 110 — Wie wird erneuet, wie wird erfreuet
- BuxWV 111 — Wo ist doch mein Freund geblieben?
- BuxWV 112 — Wo soll ich fliehen hin?

=== Miscellaneous vocal music (113–135) ===
==== Liturgical works (113–114) ====
- BuxWV 113 — Motet 'Benedicam Dominum in omni tempore'
- BuxWV 114 — Missa brevis

==== Wedding arias (115–122) ====
- BuxWV 115 — Aria 'Auf, Saiten, auf! Lasst euren Schall erklingen!'
- BuxWV 116 — Aria 'Auf, stimmet die Saiten, Gott Phoebus tritt ein'
- BuxWV 117 — Aria 'Deh credete il vostro vanto'
- BuxWV 118 — Aria 'Gestreuet mit Bleumen'
- BuxWV 119 — Aria 'Klinget fur Freuden, ihr larmen Klarinen'
- BuxWV 120 — Aria 'O fröhliche Stunden, o herrlicher Tag'
- BuxWV 121 — Aria 'Opachi boschetti' (fragment of a lost wedding serenade)
- BuxWV 122 — Aria 'Schlagt, Künstler, die Pauken und Saiten'

==== Canons (123–124) ====
- BuxWV 123 — Canon duplex per Augmentationem
- BuxWV 124 — Canon à 3 in Epidiapente et Epidiapason

==== Titles of works not preserved (125–127) ====
- BuxWV 125 — Motet 'Christum lieb haben ist viel besser' (lost)
- BuxWV 126 — Musik zur Einweihung des Fredenhagen-Altars (lost)
- BuxWV 127 — Motet 'Pallidi salvete' (lost)

==== Abendmusiken (128–135) ====
- BuxWV 128 — Die Hochzeit des Lammes / Und die Freudenvolle Einholung der Braut zu derselben (lost)
- BuxWV 129 — Das allerschröcklichste und Allererfreulichste, nemlich Ende der Zeit und Anfang der Ewigkeit (lost)
- BuxWV 130 — Himmlische Seelenlust auf Erden (lost)
- BuxWV 131 — Der verlorene Sohn (lost)
- BuxWV 132 — Hundertjähriges Gedicht (lost)
- BuxWV 133 — Die Abendmusiken des Jahres 1700
- BuxWV 134 — Castrum Doloris (lost)
- BuxWV 135 — Templum Honoris (lost)

== Organ (or other keyboard) works (136–225) ==
=== Freely composed (136–176) ===
Note: Buxtehude preludes are multi-sectional and do not fit Bach-related terms such as "prelude and fugue" (despite this use by record companies); to make the distinction the German word "Praeludium" is conventional. Typical Buxtehude preludes begin free-style, switch to fugue, and then alternate between these forms, for a total of five to seven sections, two or three of which are fugues. The free-style sections are usually toccata-like.

- BuxWV 136 — Praeludium (with 3 Fugues) in C
- BuxWV 137 — Praeludium (with Fugue and Chaconne) in C
- BuxWV 138 — Praeludium in C
- BuxWV 139 — Praeludium (with 3 Fugues) in D
- BuxWV 140 — Praeludium (with 2 Fugues) in D minor
- BuxWV 141 — Praeludium in E
- BuxWV 142 — Praeludium (with 3 Fugues) in E minor
- BuxWV 143 — Praeludium (with 2 Fugues) in E minor
- BuxWV 144 — Praeludium in F – binary form with one fugue, so akin to a Bachian "prelude and fugue"
- BuxWV 145 — Praeludium in F – binary form with one fugue, so akin to a Bachian "prelude and fugue"
- BuxWV 146 — Praeludium (with 2 Fugues) in F♯ minor
- BuxWV 147 — Praeludium in G
- BuxWV 148 — Praeludium in G minor
- BuxWV 149 — Praeludium (with 2 Fugues) in G minor
- BuxWV 150 — Praeludium (with 4 Fugues) in G minor
- BuxWV 151 — Praeludium in A
- BuxWV 152 — Praeludium in A minor (Phrygian mode)
- BuxWV 153 — Praeludium (with 2 Fugues) in A minor
- BuxWV 154 — Praeludium in B♭

==== Toccatas ====
- BuxWV 155 — Toccata (with Fugal Sections) in D minor
- BuxWV 156 — Toccata (with Fugal Sections) in F
- BuxWV 157 — Toccata and Fugue in F

==== Ostinato works ====
- BuxWV 159 — Chaconne in C minor
- BuxWV 160 — Chaconne in E minor
- BuxWV 161 — Passacaglia in D minor – slower than the chaconnes

==== Other pedaliter work ====
- BuxWV 158 — Praeambulum in A minor – this is an early work, c. 1660

==== Manualiter works (i.e. no pedal) ====
- BuxWV 162 — Praeludium in G for Harpsichord (or Organ)
- BuxWV 163 — Praeludium (Toccatas and 3 Fugues) in G minor for Harpsichord (or Organ)
- BuxWV 164 — Toccata (with Fugue) in G for Harpsichord (or Organ)
- BuxWV 165 — Toccata (with Fugue) in G for Harpsichord (or Organ)
- BuxWV 166 — Canzona (with Fugues) in C for Harpsichord (or Organ)
- BuxWV 167 — Canzonetta in C for Harpsichord (or Organ)
- BuxWV 168 — Canzonetta in D minor for Harpsichord (or Organ)
- BuxWV 169 — Canzonetta in E minor for Harpsichord (or Organ)
- BuxWV 170 — Canzona (with Fugues) in G for Harpsichord (or Organ)
- BuxWV 171 — Canzonetta in G for Harpsichord (or Organ)
- BuxWV 172 — Canzonetta in G for Harpsichord (or Organ)
- BuxWV 173 — Canzonetta in G minor for Harpsichord (or Organ)
- BuxWV 174 — Fugue (Gigue) in C for Harpsichord
- BuxWV 175 — Fugue in G for Harpsichord
- BuxWV 176 — Fugue in B♭ for Harpsichord

=== Chorale preludes (177–224, including Magnificats and the Te Deum) ===
Buxtehude composed chorale preludes on the following hymns:

- BuxWV 177 — Ach Gott und Herr (D minor [Dorian mode])
- BuxWV 178 — Ach Herr, mich armen Sünder (A minor [Phrygian mode])
- BuxWV 179 — Auf meinen lieben Gott (E minor; a suite or Suite de danses for keyboard or organ)
- BuxWV 180 — Christ unser Herr zum Jordan kam (D minor [Dorian mode])
- BuxWV 181 — Danket dem Herren, denn er ist sehr freundlich (G minor [Dorian mode])
- BuxWV 182 — Der Tag, der ist so freudenreich (G major)
- BuxWV 183 — Durch Adams Fall ist ganz verderbt (D minor [Dorian mode])
- BuxWV 184 — Ein feste Burg ist unser Gott (C major)
- BuxWV 185 — Erhalt uns, Herr, bei deinem Wort (G minor [Dorian mode])
- BuxWV 186 — Es ist das Heil uns kommen her (C major)
- BuxWV 187 — Es spricht der Unweisen Mund wohl (G major)
- BuxWV 188 — Gelobet seist du, Jesu Christ (G major [Mixolydian mode]; chorale fantasia)
- BuxWV 189 — Gelobet seist du, Jesu Christ (G major [Mixolydian mode])
- BuxWV 190 — Gott der Vater wohn uns bei (G major [Mixolydian mode])
- BuxWV 191 — Herr Christ, der einig Gotts Sohn (G major)
- BuxWV 192 — Herr Christ, der einig Gotts Sohn (G major)
- BuxWV 193 — Herr Jesu Christ, ich weiß gar wohl (A minor)
- BuxWV 194 — Ich dank dir, lieber Herre (F major; chorale fantasia)
- BuxWV 195 — Ich dank dir schon durch deinen Sohn (F major; chorale fantasia)
- BuxWV 196 — Ich ruf zu dir, Herr Jesu Christ (D minor [Dorian mode]; chorale fantasia)
- BuxWV 197 — In dulci jubilo (G major)
- BuxWV 198 — Jesus Christus, unser Heiland, der den Tod überwand (G minor [Dorian mode])
- BuxWV 199 — Komm, Heiliger Geist, Herre Gott (F major)
- BuxWV 200 — Komm, heiliger Geist, Herre Gott (F major)
- BuxWV 201 — Kommt her zu mir, spricht Gottes Sohn (G minor [Dorian mode])
- BuxWV 202 — Lobt Gott, ihr Christen, allzugleich (G major)
- BuxWV 203 — Magnificat primi toni in D minor Dorian mode (fantasia)
- BuxWV 204 — Magnificat primi toni in D minor (fantasia)
- BuxWV 205 — Magnificat noni toni in D minor Dorian mode (fantasia)
- BuxWV 206 — Mensch, willt du leben seliglich (E minor [Phrygian mode])
- BuxWV 207 — Nimm von uns, Herr, du treuer Gott (D minor [Dorian mode]; chorale fantasia)
- BuxWV 208 — Nun bitten wir den heiligen Geist (G major)
- BuxWV 209 — Nun bitten wir den heiligen Geist (G major)
- BuxWV 210 — Nun freut euch, lieben Christen g'mein (G major; chorale fantasia)
- BuxWV 211 — Nun komm, der Heiden Heiland (G minor [Dorian mode])
- BuxWV 212 — Nun lob, mein Seel, den Herren (C major; chorale fantasia)
- BuxWV 213 — Nun lob, mein Seel, den Herren
- BuxWV 214 — Nun lob, mein Seel, den Herren
- BuxWV 215 — Nun lob, mein Seel, den Herren
- BuxWV 216 — O Lux beata, Trinitas (fragment)
- BuxWV 217 — Puer natus in Bethlehem
- BuxWV 218 — Te Deum laudamus (fantasia in 5 sections: a prelude and 4 verse-settings; Buxtehude's longest organ work at 13–14 minutes)
- BuxWV 219 — Vater unser im Himmelreich
- BuxWV 220 — Von Gott will ich nicht lassen
- BuxWV 221 — Von Gott will ich nicht lassen
- BuxWV 222 — War Gott nicht mit uns diese Zeit
- BuxWV 223 — Wie schön leuchtet der Morgenstern (chorale fantasia)
- BuxWV 224 — Wir danken dir, Herr Jesu Christ

=== Canzonetta for keyboard or organ (225) ===
The keyboard canzonetta in A minor, BuxWV 225, was found just before the publication and therefore could not be inserted in the catalogue properly. This is why it does not appear with other canzonas and canzonettas and is in the end of the list of organ works.

- BuxWV 225 — Canzonetta in A minor for keyboard (or organ)

== Works for harpsichord (226–251) ==
=== Suites for harpsichord (226–244) ===
- BuxWV 226 — Suite in C major
- BuxWV 227 — Suite in C major
- BuxWV 228 — Suite in C major
- BuxWV 229 — Suite in C major
- BuxWV 230 — Suite in C major
- BuxWV 231 — Suite in C major
- BuxWV 232 — Suite in D major
- BuxWV 233 — Suite in D minor
- BuxWV 234 — Suite in D minor
- BuxWV 235 — Suite in E minor
- BuxWV 236 — Suite in E minor
- BuxWV 237 — Suite in E minor
- BuxWV 238 — Suite in F major
- BuxWV 239 — Suite in F major
- BuxWV 240 — Suite in G major
- BuxWV 241 — Suite in G minor
- BuxWV 242 — Suite in G minor
- BuxWV 243 — Suite in A major
- BuxWV 244 — Suite in A minor

=== Variations and miscellaneous works for harpsichord (245–251) ===
- BuxWV 245 — Courante zimble with 8 variations in A minor
- BuxWV 246 — Aria with 10 variations in C major
- BuxWV 247 — Aria 'More Palatino' (Theme and 12 Variations) in C major
- BuxWV 248 — Aria 'Rofilis' (Theme and 3 Variations) in D minor; theme of Arrêtez, belle Iris, différez un moment by Jean-Baptiste Lully
- BuxWV 249 — Aria with 3 variations in A minor
- BuxWV 250 — Aria 'La Capricciosa' (Theme and 32 Variations) in G major
- BuxWV 251 — Seven suites "Die Natur und Eigenschaft der Planeten" for keyboard (lost, mentioned by Johann Mattheson)

== Chamber music (252–275) ==
- Seven Sonatas, Op. 1 (c. 1694):
  - BuxWV 252 — Sonata in F major for violin, viola da gamba and basso continuo
  - BuxWV 253 — Sonata in G major for violin, viola da gamba and basso continuo
  - BuxWV 254 — Sonata in A minor for violin, viola da gamba and basso continuo
  - BuxWV 255 — Sonata in B♭ major for violin, viola da gamba and basso continuo
  - BuxWV 256 — Sonata in C major for violin, viola da gamba and basso continuo
  - BuxWV 257 — Sonata in D minor for violin, viola da gamba and basso continuo
  - BuxWV 258 — Sonata in E minor for violin, viola da gamba and basso continuo
- Seven Sonatas, Op. 2 (1696):
  - BuxWV 259 — Sonata in B♭ major for violin, viola da gamba and basso continuo
  - BuxWV 260 — Sonata in D major for violin, viola da gamba and basso continuo
  - BuxWV 261 — Sonata in G minor for violin, viola da gamba and basso continuo
  - BuxWV 262 — Sonata in C minor for violin, viola da gamba and basso continuo
  - BuxWV 263 — Sonata in A major for violin, viola da gamba and basso continuo
  - BuxWV 264 — Sonata in E major for violin, viola da gamba and basso continuo
  - BuxWV 265 — Sonata in F major for violin, viola da gamba and basso continuo
- BuxWV 266 — Sonata in C major for 2 violins, viola da gamba and basso continuo
- BuxWV 267 — Sonata in D major for viola da gamba, violone and basso continuo
- BuxWV 268 — Sonata in D major for viola da gamba and basso continuo
- BuxWV 269 — Sonata in F major for 2 violins, viola da gamba and basso continuo
- BuxWV 270 — Sonata in F major for 2 violins and basso continuo (fragment)
- BuxWV 271 — Sonata in G major for 2 violins, viola da gamba and basso continuo
- BuxWV 272 — Sonata in A minor for violin, viola da gamba and basso continuo
- BuxWV 273 — Sonata in B♭ major for violin, viola da gamba and basso continuo
- BuxWV 274 — Sonata (lost)
- BuxWV 275 — Sonata (lost)

== Appendix (Anh. 1–13) ==
=== Doubtful works (1–8) ===
- BuxWV Anh. 1 — Magnificat anima mea Domine
- BuxWV Anh. 2 — Man singet mit Freuden vom Sieg
- BuxWV Anh. 3 — Wacht! Euch zum Streit gefasset macht / Das jüngste Gericht (oratorio in 3 acts)
- BuxWV Anh. 4 — Natalia Sacra (lost)
- BuxWV Anh. 5 — Sonata in D minor
- BuxWV Anh. 6 — Courante in D minor for harpsichord
- BuxWV Anh. 7 — Courante in G major for harpsichord
- BuxWV Anh. 8 — Simphonia in G major

=== Falsely attributed works (9–13) ===
- BuxWV Anh. 9 — Cantata 'Erbarm dich mein, o Herre Gott' (by Ludwig Busbetzky)
- BuxWV Anh. 10 — Psalm setting 'Laudate Dominum omnes gentes' (by Ludwig Busbetzky)
- BuxWV Anh. 11 — Chorale prelude 'Erhalt uns Herr, bei deinem Wort' for keyboard (author unknown, also attributed to Georg Böhm and Johann Pachelbel)
- BuxWV Anh. 12 — Suite in D minor for harpsichord (by Nicolas Lebègue)
- BuxWV Anh. 13 — Suite in G minor for harpsichord (by Nicolas Lebègue)

== Literature ==
- Georg Karstädt. Thematisch-systematisches Verzeichnis der musikalischen Werke von Dietrich Buxtehude: Buxtehude-Werke-Verzeichnis (BuxWV). Breitkopf & Härtel, Wiesbaden 1985 (2nd edition), ISBN 3-7651-0065-X
