= Orlanda Velez Isidro =

Portuguese classically trained coloratura soprano

- Born: 6 March 1972 (age 54); Évora, Portugal
- Occupation: Classical coloratura soprano
- Years active: 1992–present

Orlanda Velez Isidro (born 6 March 1972) is a Portuguese classically trained coloratura soprano. Her preferred genre of music is Renaissance and Baroque repertoire. Since completing her education in Portugal and the Netherlands, she has lived and performed in the Netherlands.

== Career ==
Orlanda Velez Isidro was born on 6 March 1972 in Évora, Portugal, and began her musical studies at age seven studying piano and violin. She started vocal training at the National Conservatory of Lisbon with Maria Repas Gonçalves. Between 1992 and 1997, Velez sang in the Gulbenkian Choir of Lisbon. She graduated with a degree in musicology in 1997, and moved to the Netherlands.

At the Royal Conservatory of The Hague, Velez studied with Rita Dams and Lenie van den Heuvel and was trained in repertoire by Jill Feldman, Meinard Kraak and Marius van Altena, graduating in 2000. She has continued her studies in master classes by Elly Ameling, Jill Feldman, Diane Forlano, Ronald Kleekamp, Barbara Pierson, Jennifer Smith, Nico van der Meel and Rolande van der Paal. In 2001, she participated in the "Concours International de Chant Baroque de Chimay-Belgique" and won the third prize.

She has appeared as a member of the Amsterdam Baroque Choir, the Netherlands Bach Society and the Netherlands Chamber Choir, and is a core part of those organizations. She has performed as a soloist with Eduardo Lopez Banzo; Frans Brüggen in Mendelssohn's Midsummer Night's Dream; Michel Corboz with the Gulbenkian Orchestra and Choir; Ton Koopman and The Amsterdam Baroque Orchestra & Choir in several programs of Carl Philipp Emanuel Bach, Johann Sebastian Bach, George Frideric Handel and Claudio Monteverdi; William Christie in the project Ambronay 98 and the project Le Jardin des Voix with Les Arts Florissants and Fredrik Malmberg and the Helsingborgs Symfoniorkester.

She has made recordings with Frans Brüggen of Midsummer Night's Dream with his Orchestra of the Eighteenth Century; with William Christie recordings of Moulinié Motets and sacred music of Marc-Antoine Charpentier; and with Ton Koopman recording of Carl Philipp Emanuel Bach's Matthäus-Passion (1769). In addition, she recorded Al Uso de Nuestra Tierra with Musica Temprana; Carlo Gesualdo Madrigals Libro I, II, and III with the Kassiopeia Quintet; Musica na Obra of Gil Vicente with Segréis de Lisboa; and a duet performance of Mazzocchi with Jill Feldman.

On the opera stage, Velez was Miss Jessel in Britten's The Turn of the Screw under conductor Brad Cowen, and Madame Mao in a Dutch production of John Adams' Nixon in China, which the Dutch press reviewed favorably. Her personal preference for repertoire is Renaissance, Baroque and contemporary music. She regularly performs recitals of baroque music with groups such as De Swaen, Ensemble Udite Amanti, The Kassiopeia Quintet, Musica Temprana, and Segréis de Lisboa.
