= Jörg Dürmüller =

Swiss classical tenor

- Born: 28 August 1959 (age 66); Bern
- Occupation: Classical tenor

Jörg Dürmüller (born 28 August 1959 in Bern) is a Swiss classical tenor in concert and opera.

== Biography ==
Dürmüller studied violin and voice at the conservatory of Winterthur and took voice master classes with Edith Mathis, Christa Ludwig and Hermann Prey.

As a concert singer, Dürmüller has appeared as the Evangelist in Bach's Passions and in his cantatas. He took part in the project of Ton Koopman to record the complete vocal works of Johann Sebastian Bach with the Amsterdam Baroque Orchestra & Choir. He is also a soloist in the ongoing project Dieterich Buxtehude – Opera Omnia of the same ensemble to record the complete works of Dieterich Buxtehude. He sang the tenor part of Haydn's The Creation at the Rheingau Musik Festival 2009 under Enoch zu Guttenberg.

On the opera stage he was engaged first in Bielefeld in 1987 for five years and at the Vienna Volksoper from 1997 where he appeared in Mozart operas, as Tamino in The Magic Flute, Ferrando in Così fan tutte and Ottavio in Don Giovanni, and as Don Ramiro in Rossini's La Cenerentola. As a freelance artist he has performed at the Komische Oper Berlin, among others.

== Recordings ==
Recordings of Dürmüller have been released by Virgin Classics, Harmonia Mundi, Deutsche Grammophon, Orfeo International Music Munich, and Erato.
