= Amsterdam Baroque Orchestra & Choir =

Dutch early-music group

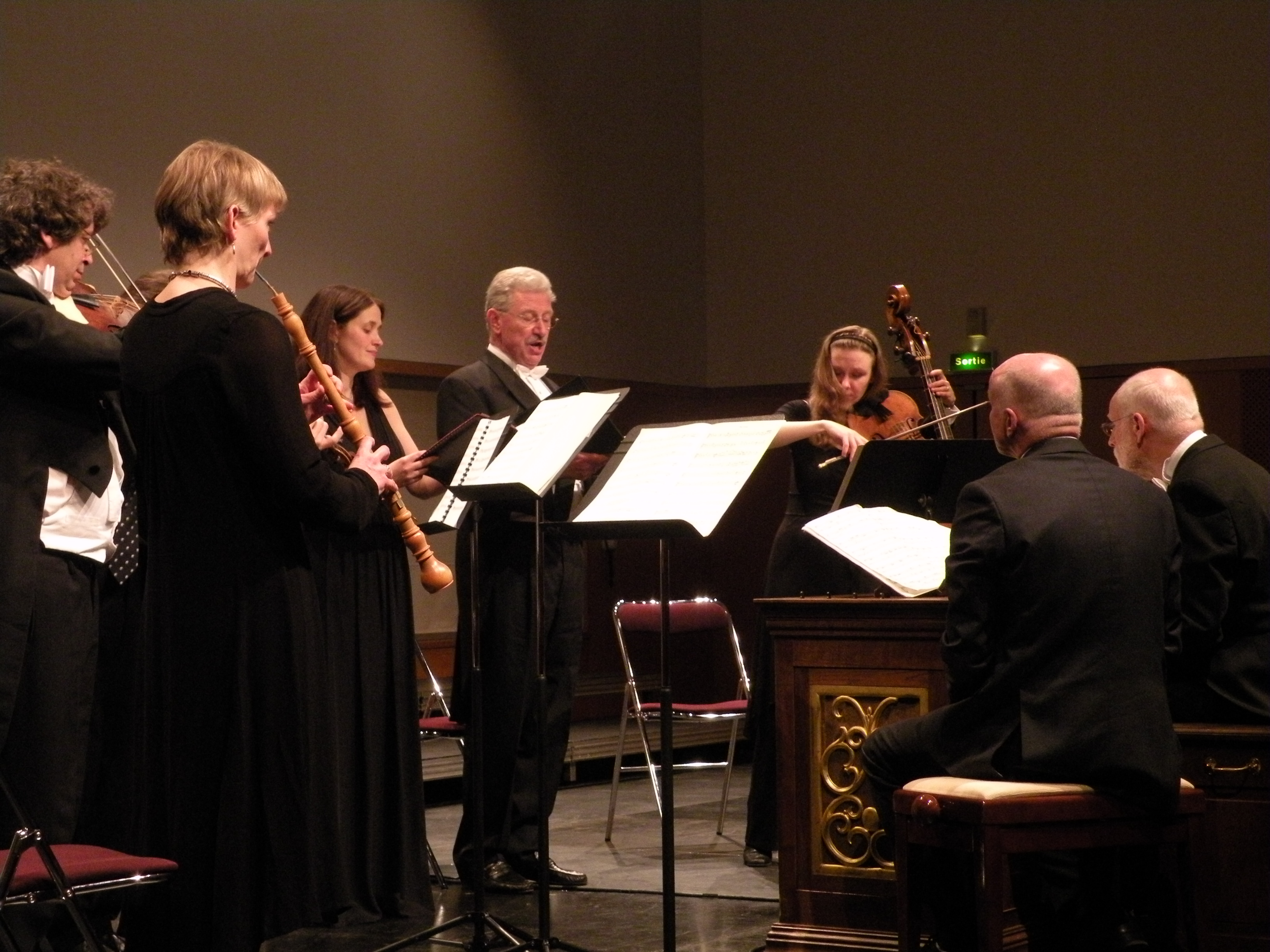
- The orchestra during La Folle Journée in 2009
- Founded: 1979 (orchestra); 1992 (choir)
- Location: Amsterdam, Netherlands
- Principal conductor: Ton Koopman
- Website: www.amsterdambaroque.com/en

The Amsterdam Baroque Orchestra & Choir is a Dutch early-music group based in Amsterdam.

The Amsterdam Baroque Orchestra & Choir was created in two stages by the conductor, organist and harpsichordist Ton Koopman. He founded the Amsterdam Baroque Orchestra in 1979 and the Amsterdam Baroque Choir in 1992. They have performed in concert halls such as the Concertgebouw Amsterdam, Barbican Centre London, Konzerthaus, Vienna, Lincoln Center New York and Tokyo Metropolitan Theatre.

The first concert of the choir and orchestra premiered two works of Heinrich Ignaz Biber, Requiem (for 15 voices) and Vespers (for 32 voices), at the 1992 Festival of Early Music in Utrecht.

In 1994, Koopman embarked on a ten-year project to conduct the group in recordings and performances of the complete vocal works of Johann Sebastian Bach. His more than 200 cantatas were recorded in 22 volumes, first under the label Erato, since 2003 Challenge / Antoine Marchand Records, reissuing also the former volumes. Soloists for this project included sopranos Els Bongers, Ruth Holton, Lisa Larsson, Marlis Petersen, Sandrine Piau, Dorothea Röschmann, Sibylla Rubens, Barbara Schlick, Caroline Stam (a member of the choir from the beginning), Deborah York, Ruth Ziesak and Johannette Zomer, altos Bogna Bartosz, Michael Chance, Franziska Gottwald, Bernhard Landauer, Elisabeth von Magnus, Annette Markert, Andreas Scholl, Nathalie Stutzmann and Kai Wessel, tenors Paul Agnew, Jörg Dürmüller, James Gilchrist, Guy de Mey, Christoph Prégardien and Gerd Türk, and bass Klaus Mertens.

In 2005 they commenced a project Dieterich Buxtehude – Opera Omnia to record the complete works of Dieterich Buxtehude (completed in 2014). Singers for this project have additionally included sopranos Bettina Pahn, Miriam Meyer, Siri Thornhill, Orlanda Velez Isidro, altos Robin Blaze, Patrick Van Goethem, Hugo Naessens, Daniel Taylor, tenor Andreas Karasiak and bass Donald Bentvelsen.
