= Kerala J. Snyder =

American musicologist and educator

Kerala Johnson Snyder is an American musicologist and educator. She is Professor Emerita of Musicology and Affiliate Faculty of Organ, Sacred Music and Historical Keyboards at the Eastman School of Music, University of Rochester. She previously taught at Yale University.

== Early life and education ==
Snyder is a graduate of Wellesley College (BA) and Harvard Divinity School. She received her Ph.D. from Yale University. From 1969 to 1981 she taught at Yale University and from 1981 to 1987 at the Hartt School of Music of the University of Hartford. From 1987, she worked with the Eastman School of Music.

She is an expert of North German and Northern European baroque music especially in organ repertoire. She wrote the authoritative biography of the Danish-German organist and composer Dieterich Buxtehude.
