= Robin Blaze =

British countertenor (born 1971)

- Born: 11 January 1971 (age 55); Manchester, England

Robin Blaze (born 11 January 1971) is a British countertenor.

== Early life ==
He was born in Manchester, England. He is the son of Peter Blaze, who is a professional golfer, by the same's wife Christine. Blaze and his brother Mark grew up in Shadwell, near Leeds, and he was educated at Leeds Grammar School, Uppingham School, and Magdalen College, Oxford. At Uppingham School Blaze was taught by the celebrated countertenor John Whitworth.

Having made his first solo recordings as a treble with Stephen Lomas, Blaze was both a chorister and an academical clerk at Magdalen College, where he recorded with the Dufay Consort. After graduating, he won a scholarship for postgraduate studies at the Royal College of Music, where he studied with Michael Chance and Ashley Stafford. After completing his education, he became professor of Vocal Studies at the Royal College of Music. He has also studied flute, piano, and organ.

== Opera ==
His opera roles have included:

- Anfinomo in Monteverdi's Il ritorno d'Ulisse in patria (Teatro Sao Carlos, Lisbon)
- Narciso in Handel's Agrippina (Karlsruhe)
- Unulfo in Handel's Rodelinda (Broomhill Opera Festival, produced by Jonathan Miller)
- Athamas in Handel's Semele (Royal Opera House and English National Opera, conducted by Sir Charles Mackerras AC CH CBE)
- Didymus in Handel's Theodora (Glyndebourne Festival Opera)
- Arsamenes in Handel's Xerxes (English National Opera)
- Hamor in Handel's Jephtha (English National Opera and also Welsh National Opera)
- Bertarido in Handel's Rodelinda (Glyndebourne Touring Opera and Handel Festival Göttingen)
- Rinaldo in Handel's Rinaldo (Handel Festival Göttingen)
- Oberon in Britten's A Midsummer Night's Dream (English National Opera)
- Rupert Brooke in Geraint Lewis's A Shining Piece

== Performances ==
Blaze has performed with conductors including Harry Christophers, Stephen Cleobury, John Eliot Gardiner, Philippe Herreweghe, Richard Hickox, David Hill, Christopher Hogwood, René Jacobs, Robert King, Ton Koopman, Nicholas Kraemer, Gustav Leonhardt, Paul McCreesh, Nicholas McGegan, Trevor Pinnock, and Masaaki Suzuki.

He has appeared with ensembles including the Academy of Ancient Music, Akademie für Alte Musik Berlin, Amsterdam Baroque Orchestra & Choir, Bach Collegium Japan, Berlin Philharmonic Orchestra, BBC Philharmonic, La Chapelle Royale, City of London Sinfonia, Collegium Musicum 90, Collegium Vocale, The English Concert, Fretwork, Gabrieli Consort, Hallé Orchestra, Hanover Band, Israel Chamber Orchestra, King's Consort, Manchester Camerata, National Symphony Orchestra, Netherlands Radio Philharmonic, Northern Sinfonia, Orchestra of the Age of Enlightenment, Florilegium, Palladian Ensemble, The Parley of Instruments, Philadelphia Orchestra, Royal Flanders Philharmonic, Royal Liverpool Philharmonic Orchestra, RIAS Kammerchor, Saint Paul Chamber Orchestra, Scottish Chamber Orchestra, The Sixteen, Tafelmusik, and Winchester Cathedral Choir.

In November 2017 he performed at Tilford Bach Festival under Adrian Butterfield.

Blaze works regularly with pianist Graham Johnson and lutenist Elizabeth Kenny. He is involved in the project Dieterich Buxtehude – Opera Omnia of Ton Koopman and the Amsterdam Baroque Orchestra & Choir to record the complete works of Dieterich Buxtehude.

== Discography ==
Blaze has made over 50 solo recordings, including the complete Bach cantata series for Masaaki Suzuki for BIS, and a series of song recitals with Elizabeth Kenny for Hyperion. His CD of Handel duets with Carolyn Sampson was nominated for a Gramophone Award, and his recording of Thomas Adès' "Lover in Winter" won the Gramophone contemporary music recording prize. Other award-winning recordings include Byrd consort songs with Concordia and Handel's Choice of Hercules with The King's Consort, both for Hyperion Records.
