= List of gay, lesbian or bisexual people: Ba–Bh =

This is a partial list of notable people who were or are gay men, lesbian or bisexual.

The historical concept and definition of sexual orientation varies and has changed greatly over time; for example the general term "gay" wasn't used to describe sexual orientation until the mid 20th century. A number of different classification schemes have been used to describe sexual orientation since the mid-19th century, and scholars have often defined the term "sexual orientation" in divergent ways. Indeed, several studies have found that much of the research about sexual orientation has failed to define the term at all, making it difficult to reconcile the results of different studies. However, most definitions include a psychological component (such as the direction of an individual's erotic desire) and/or a behavioural component (which focuses on the sex of the individual's sexual partner/s). Some prefer to simply follow an individual's self-definition or identity.

== B ==
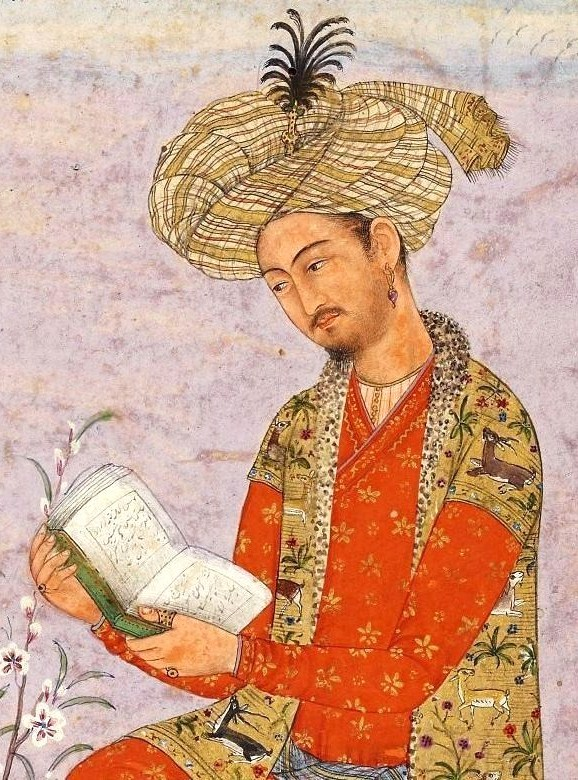
Emperor Babur

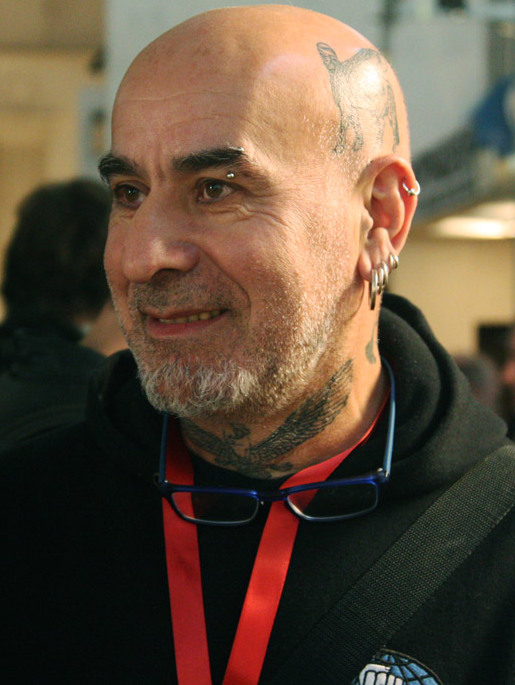
Visual artist and poet Babi Badalov

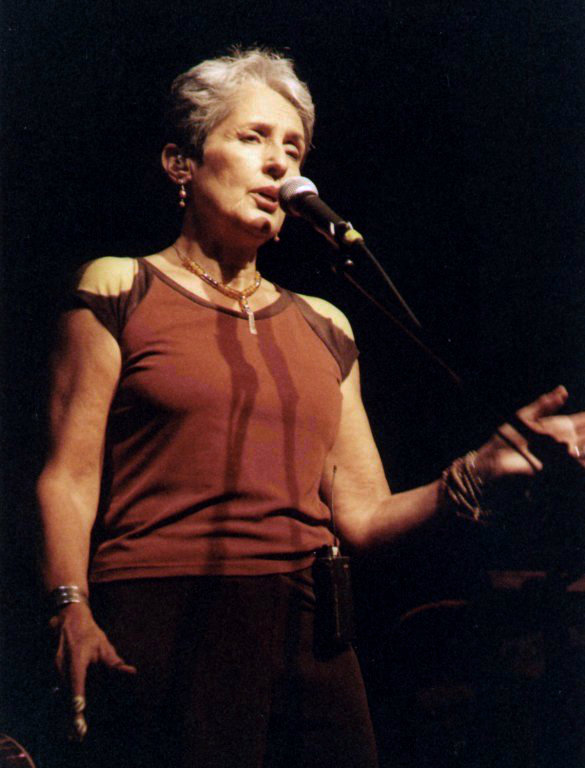
Folk singer Joan Baez

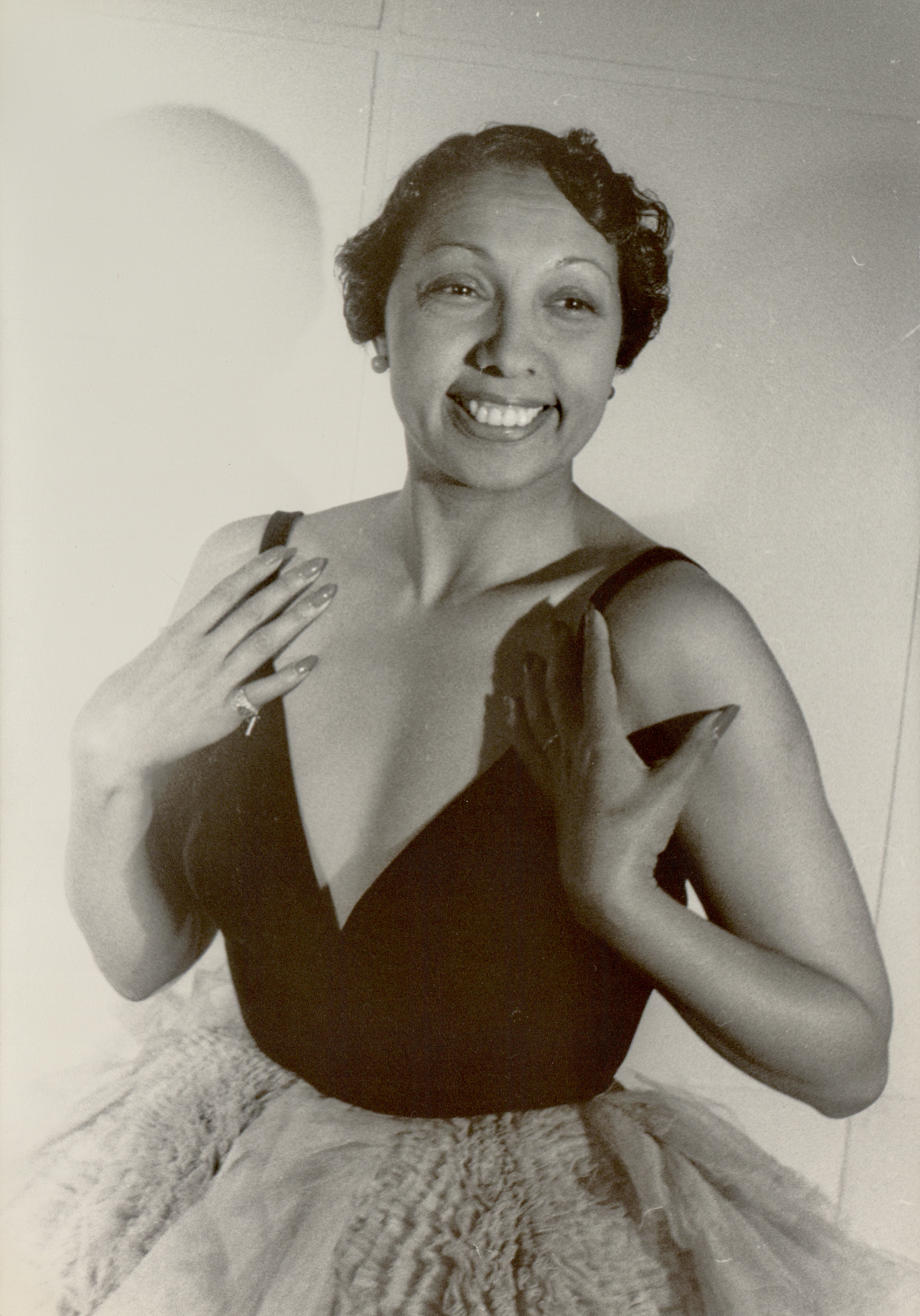
Performer Josephine Baker

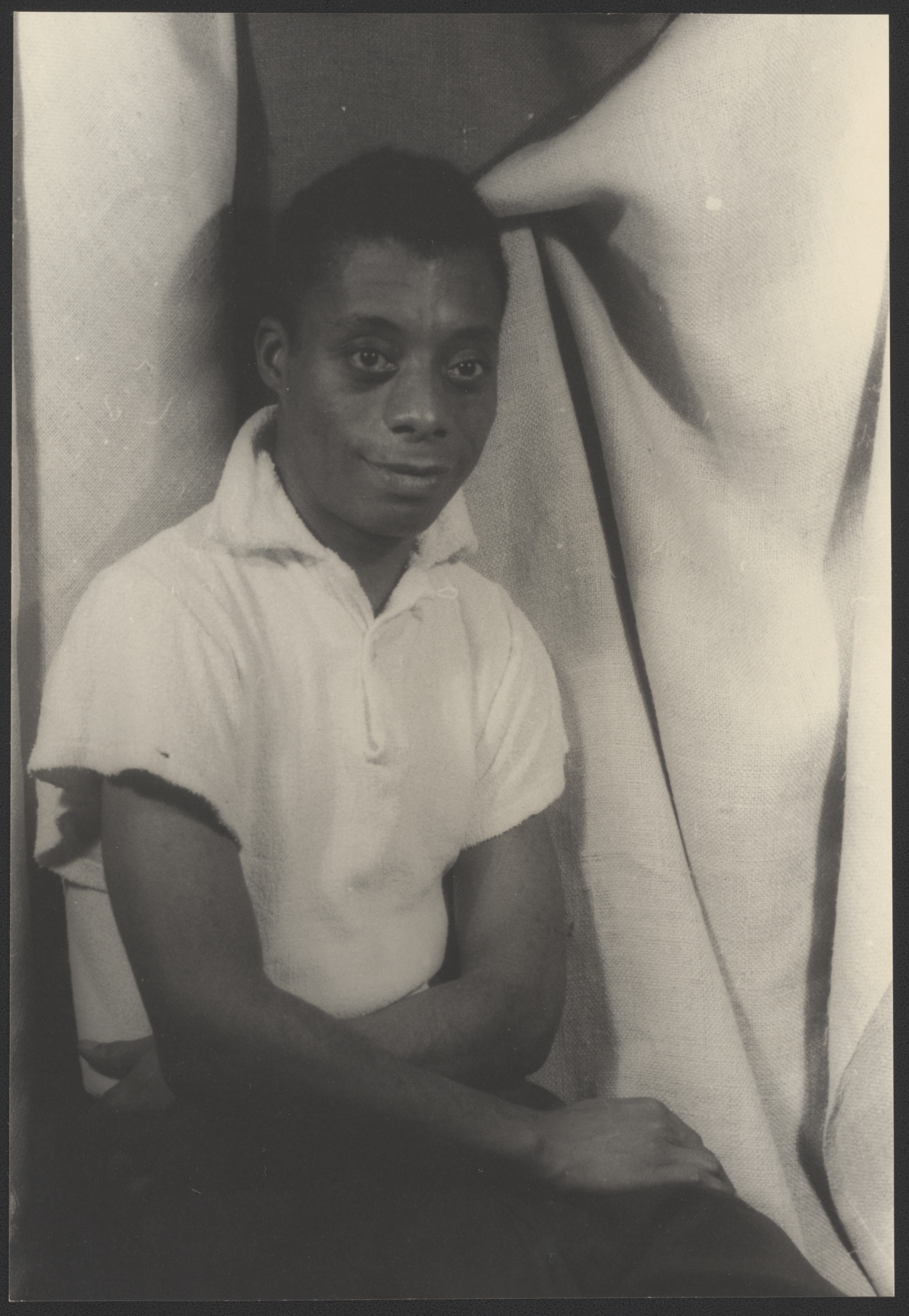
Writer James Baldwin

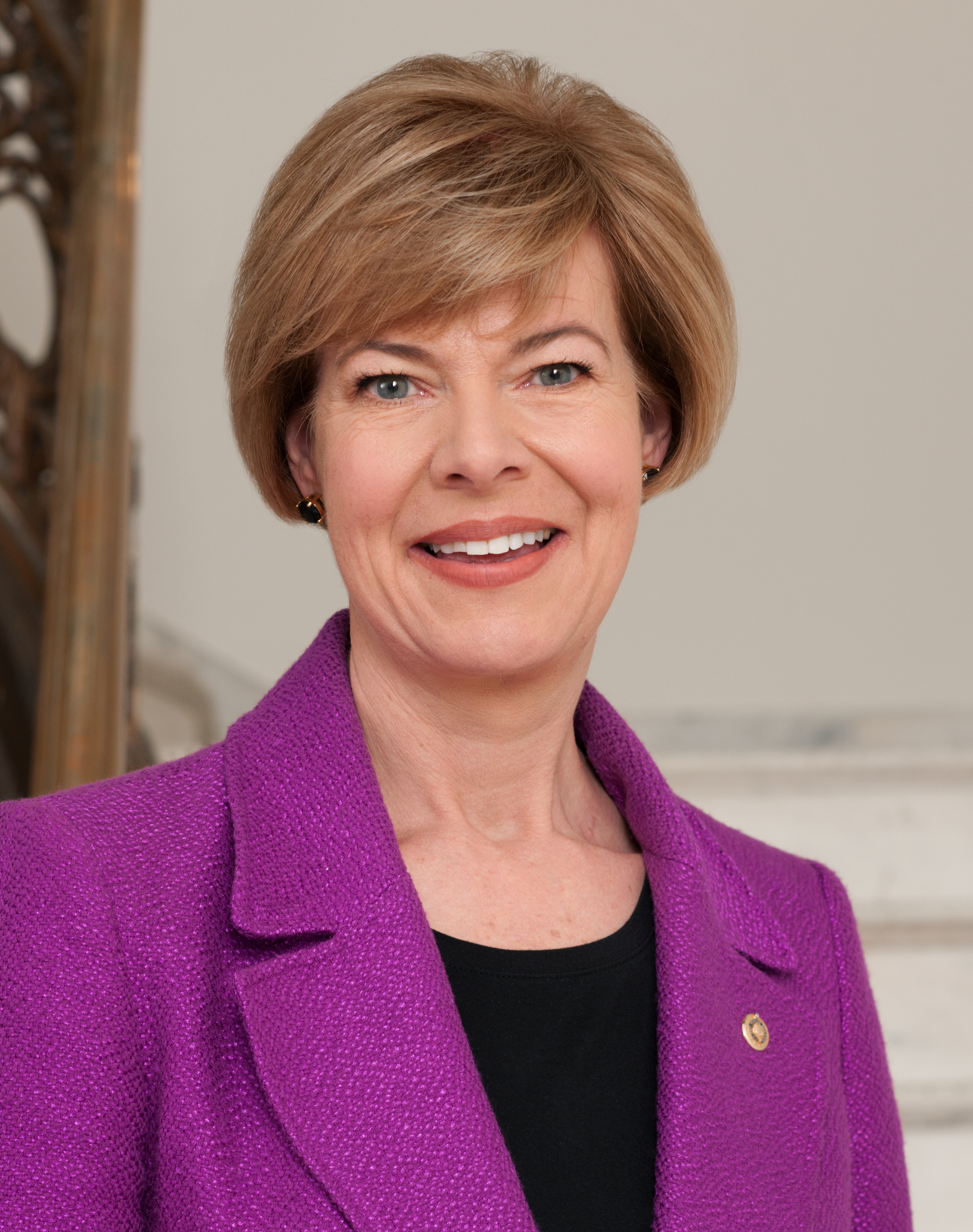
Politician Tammy Baldwin

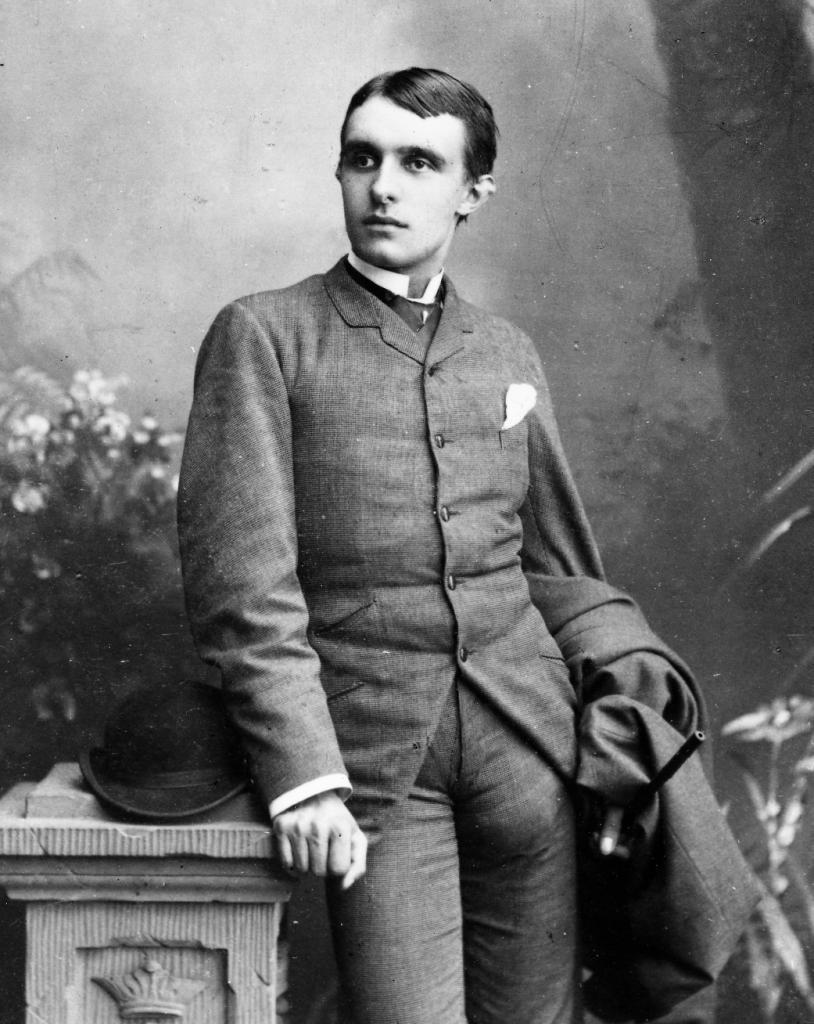
Author Herman Bang

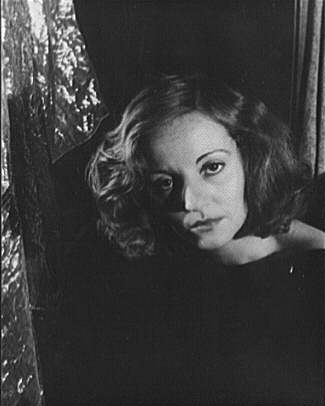
Actor Tallulah Bankhead

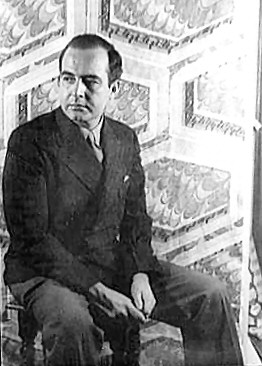
Composer Samuel Barber

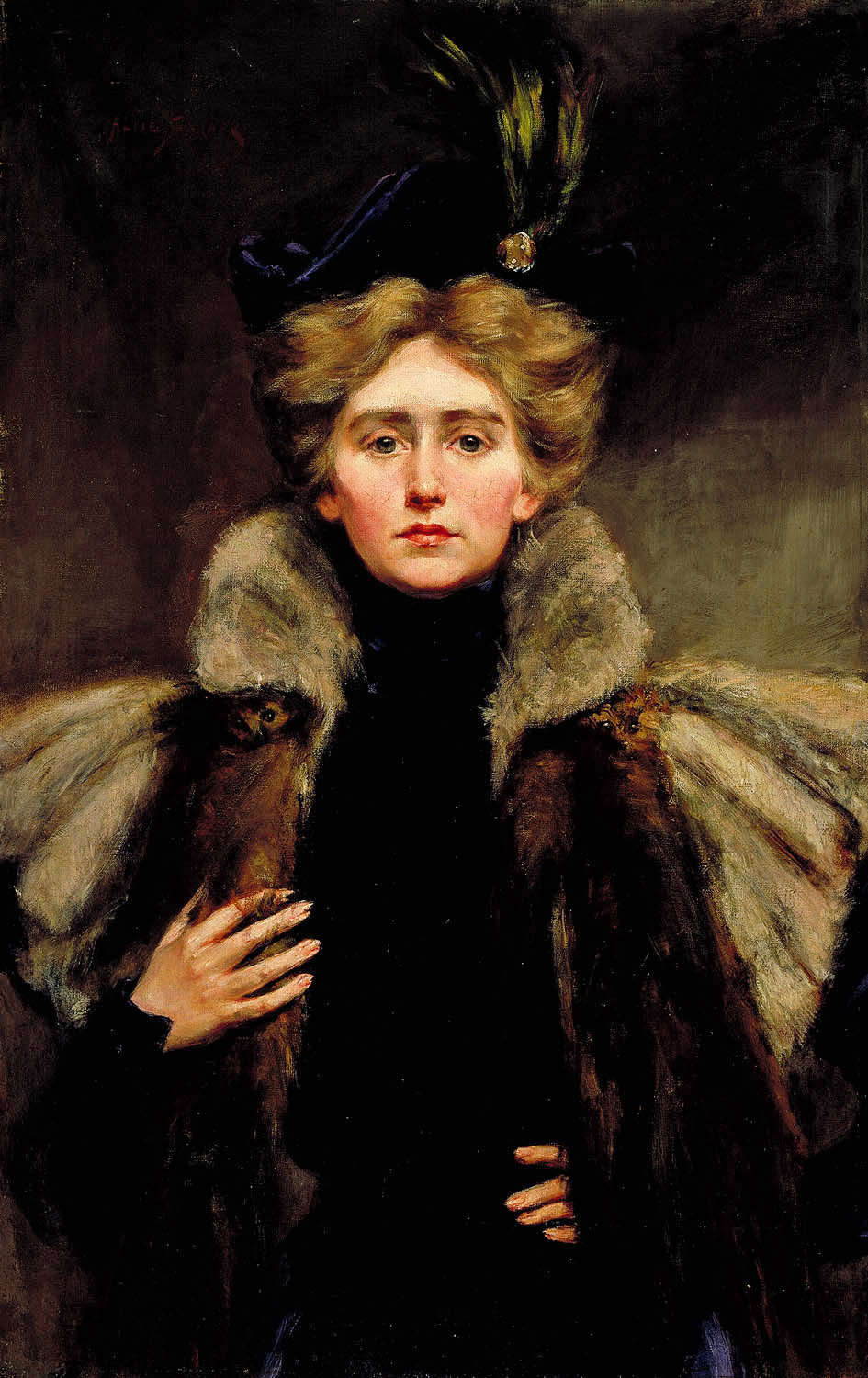
Poet, memoirist and epigrammist Natalie Clifford Barney

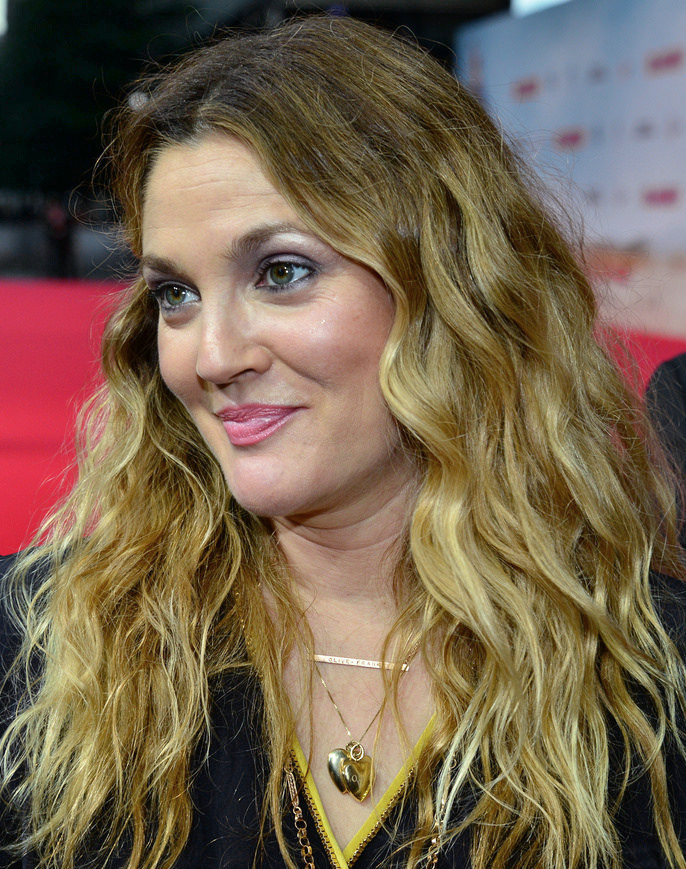
Actor Drew Barrymore

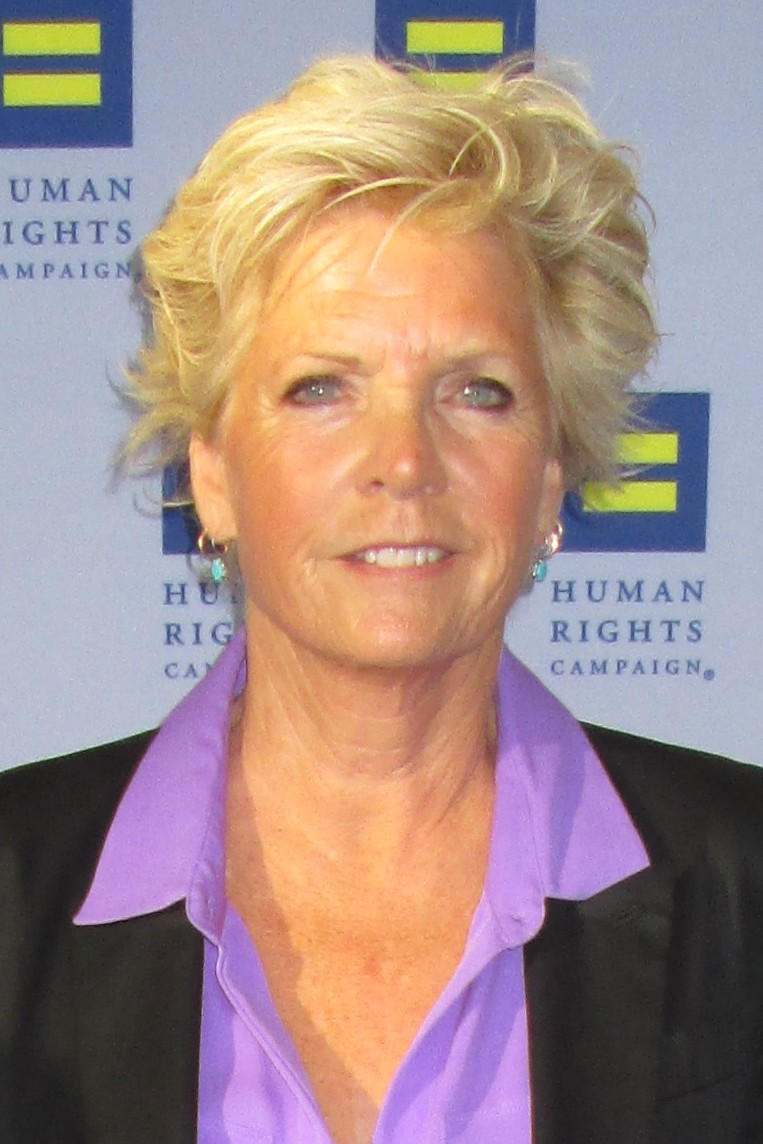
Actor Meredith Baxter

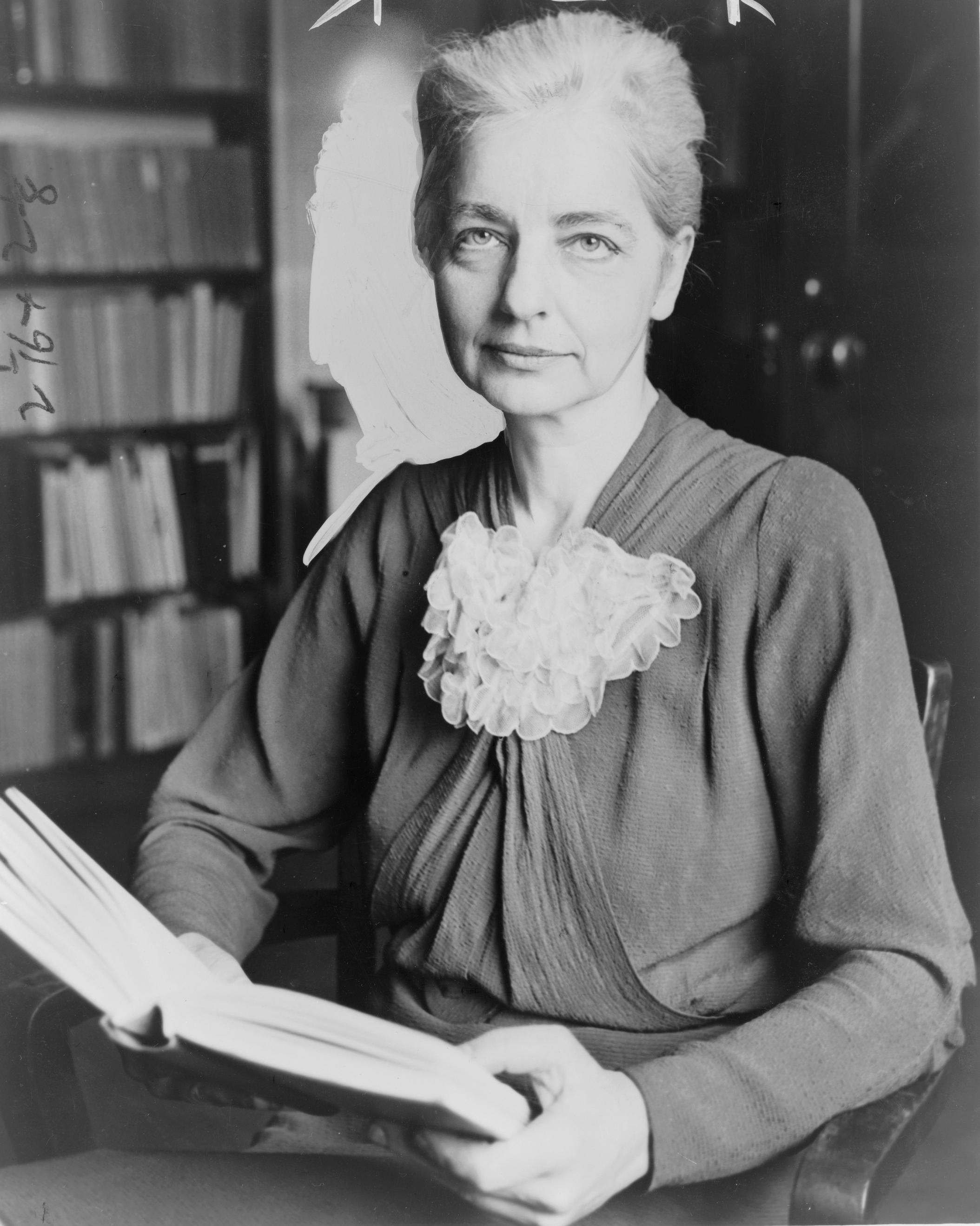
Anthropologist and folklorist Ruth Benedict

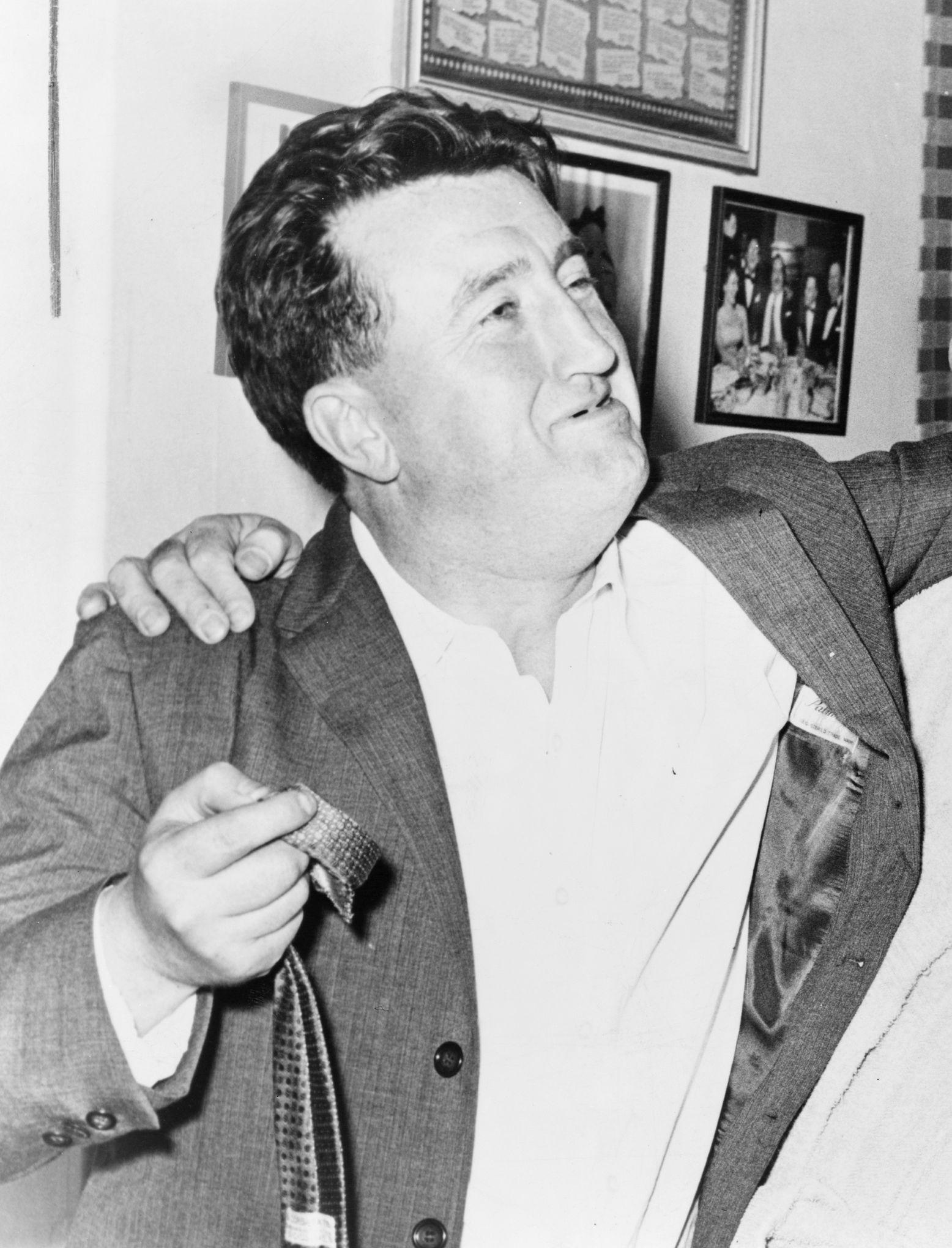
Poet, novelist and playwright Brendan Behan

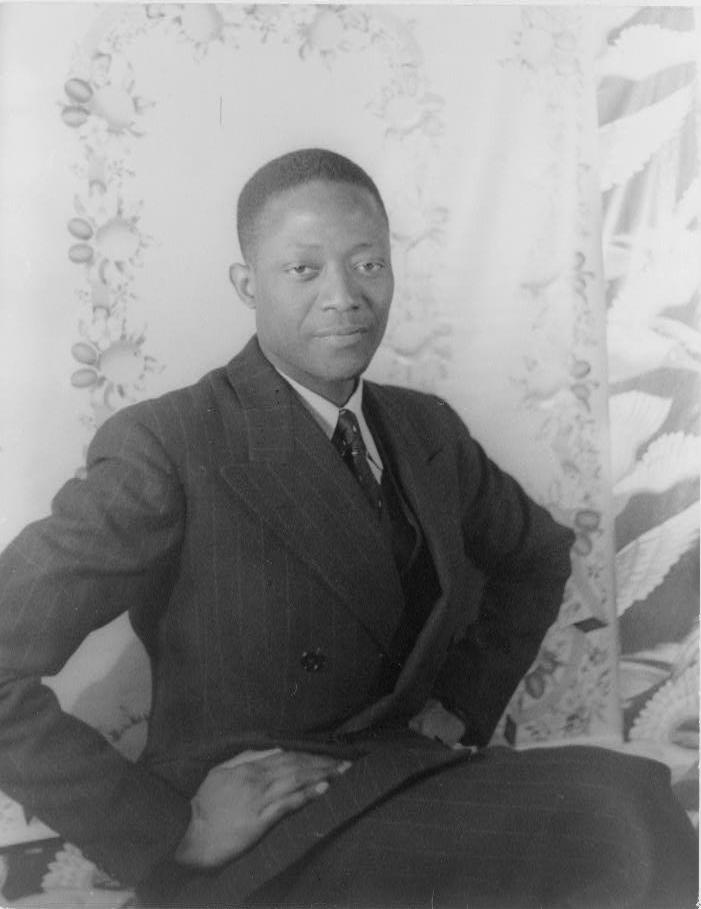
Dancer Féral Benga

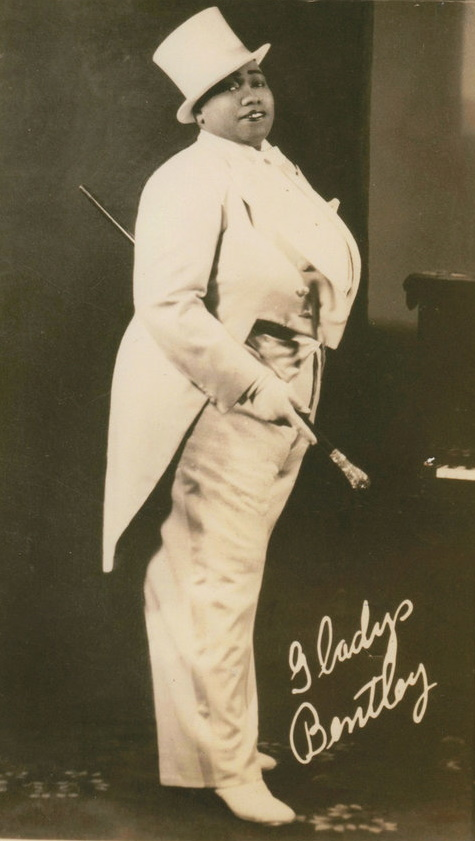
Blues musician, singer and entertainer Gladys Bentley

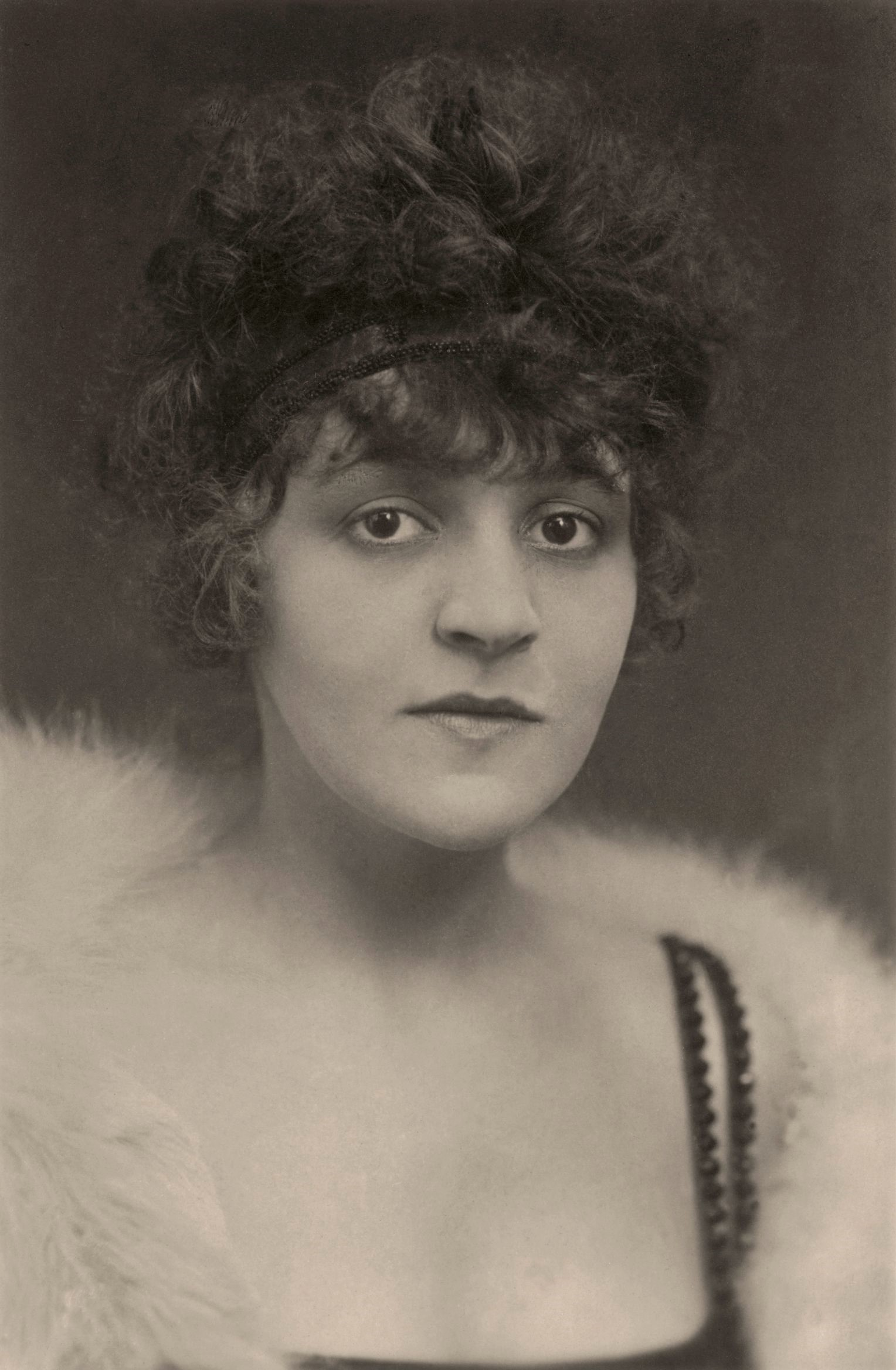
Dancer and actress Anita Berber

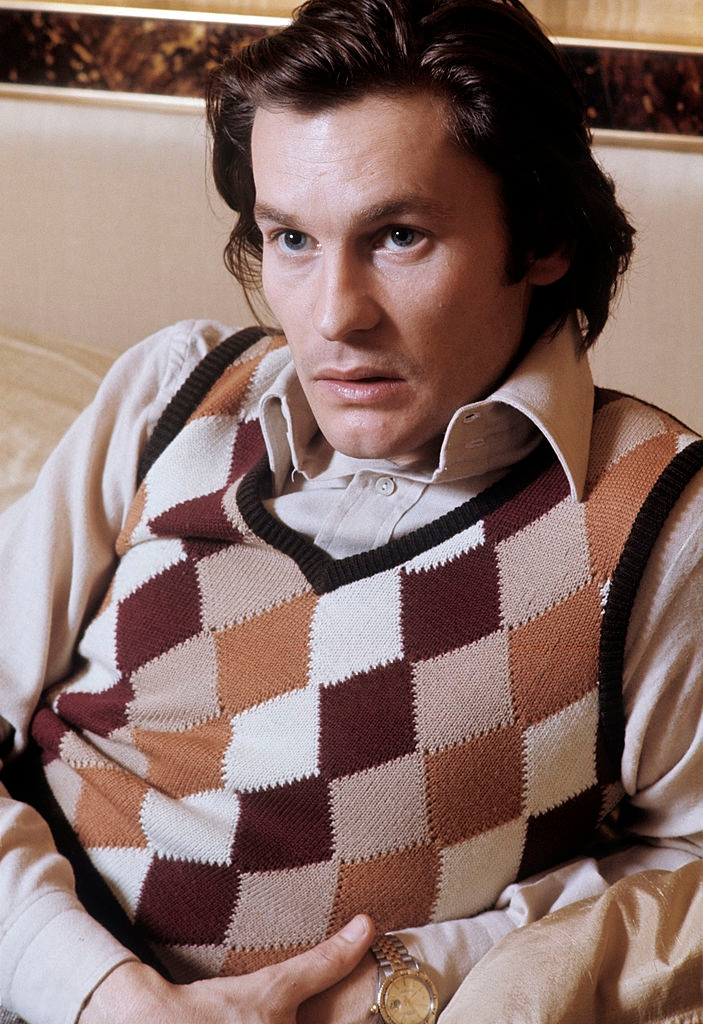
Actor Helmut Berger

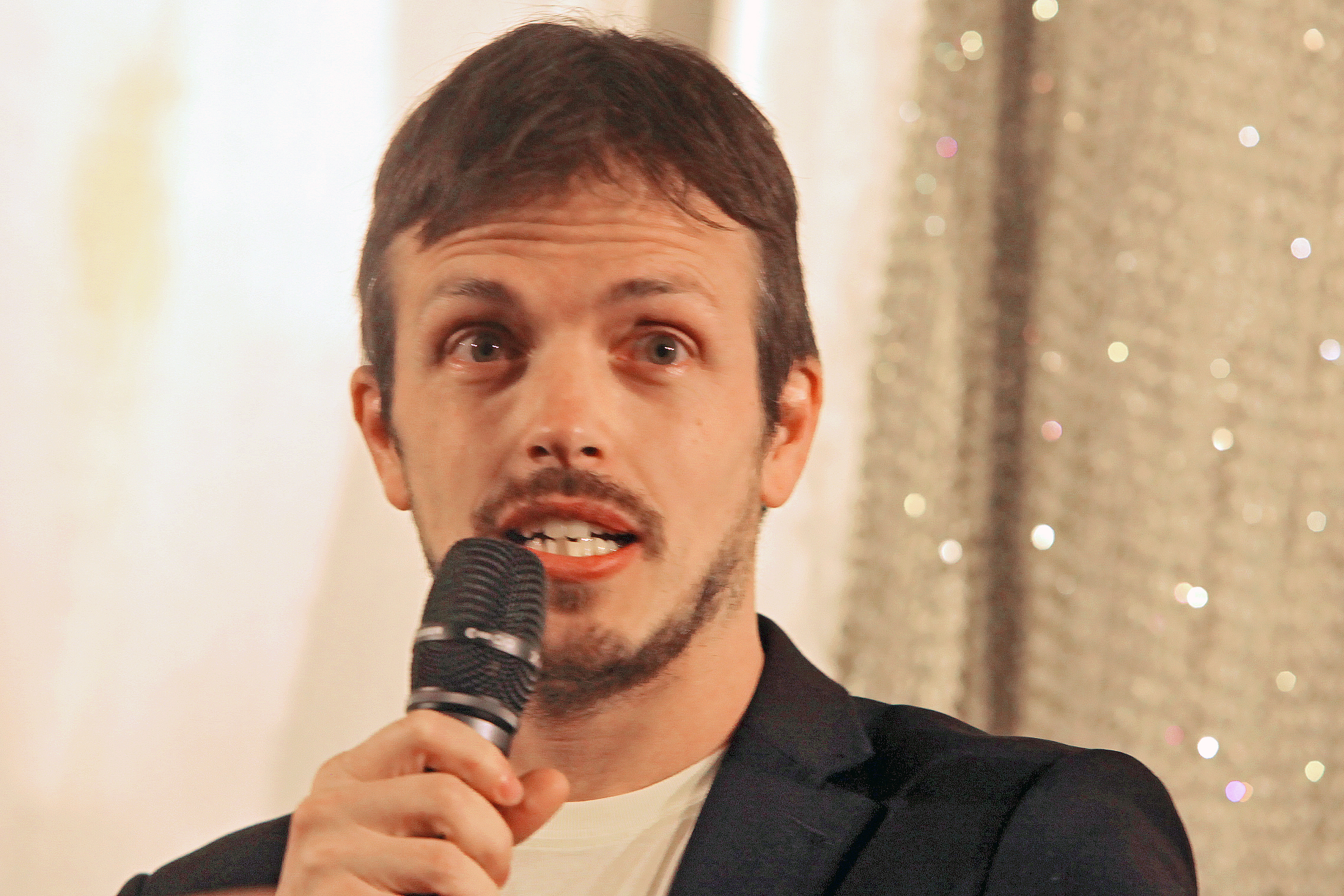
Film director and screenwriter Marco Berger

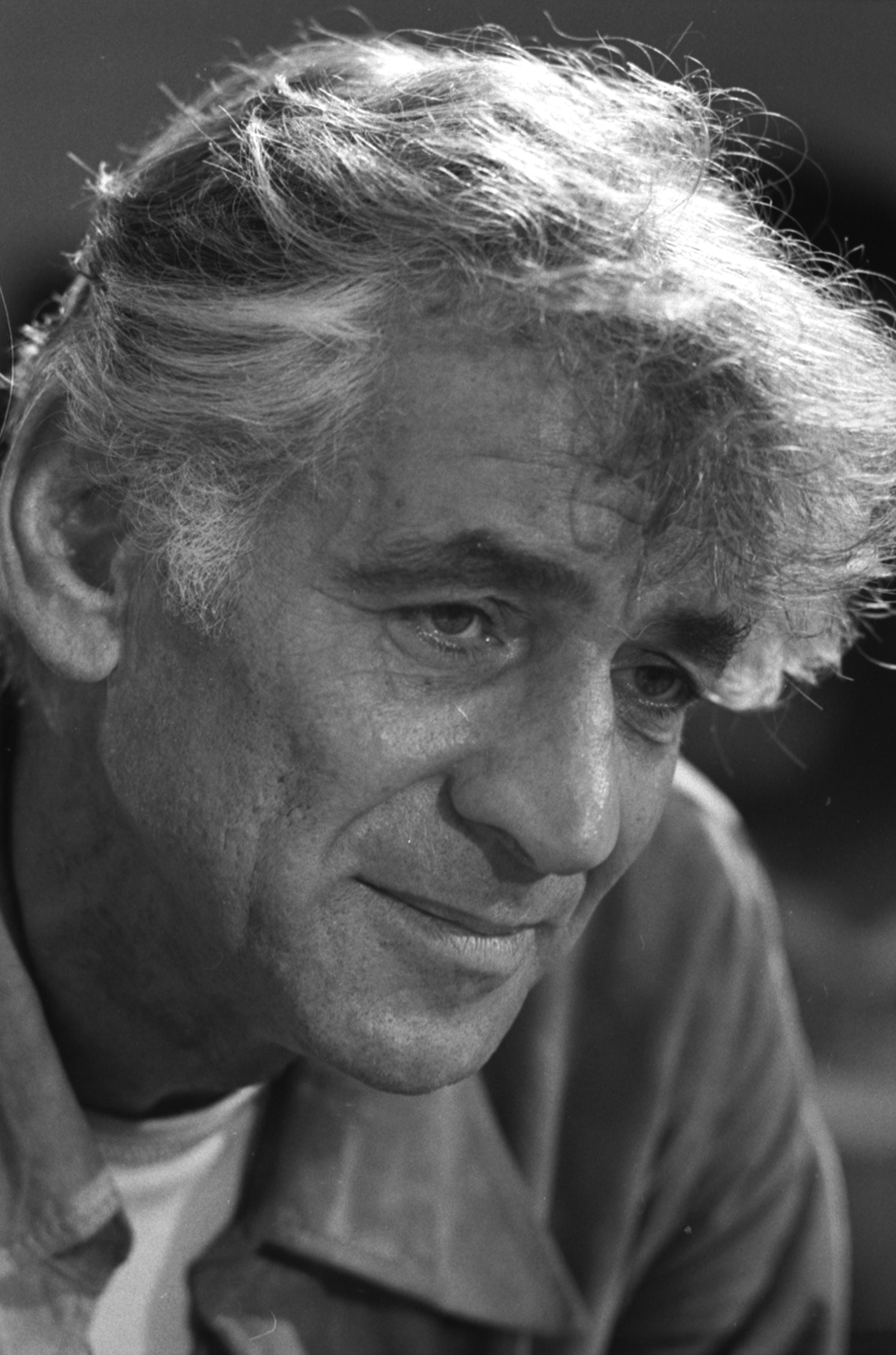
Conductor and composer Leonard Bernstein

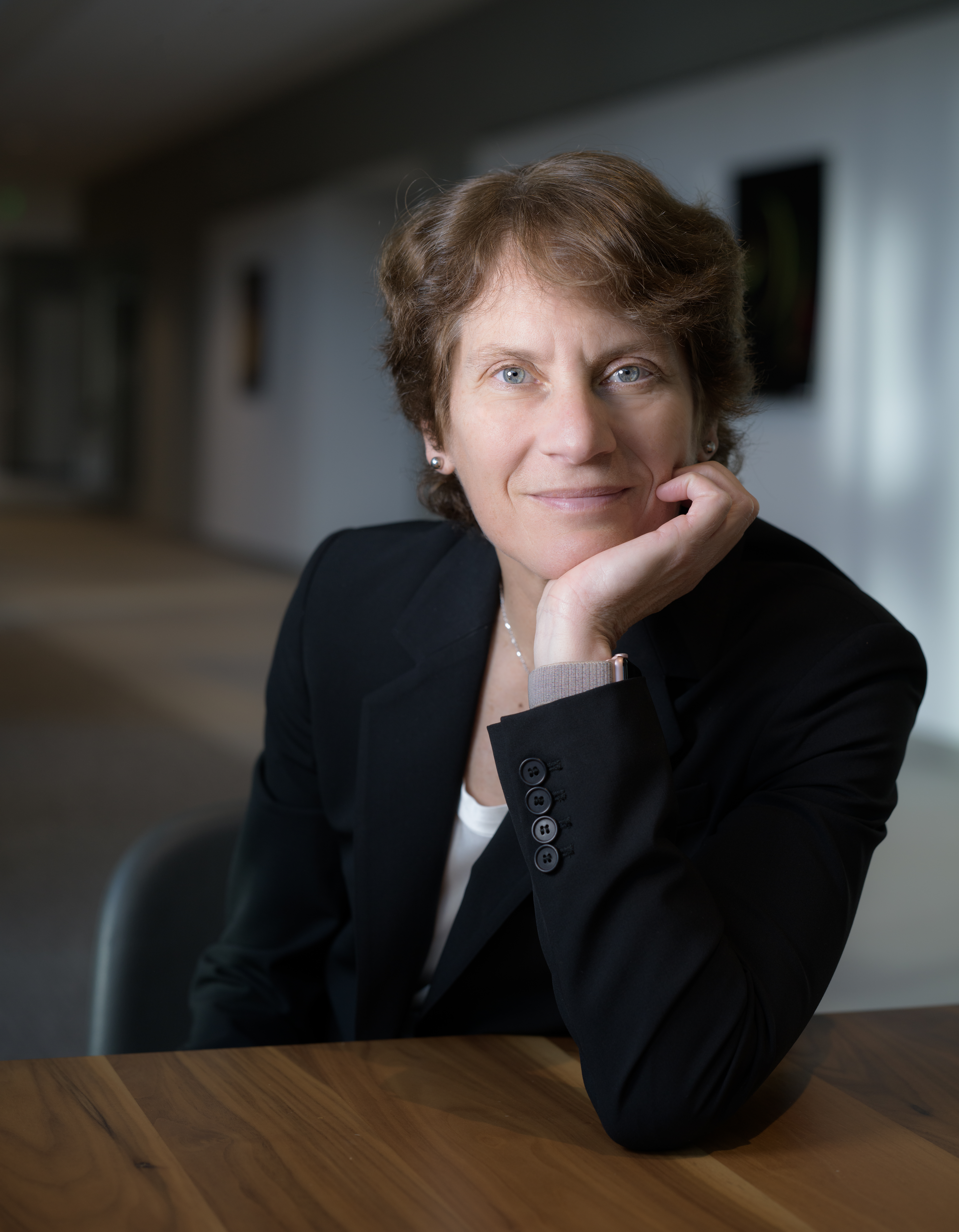
Chemist Carolyn Bertozzi

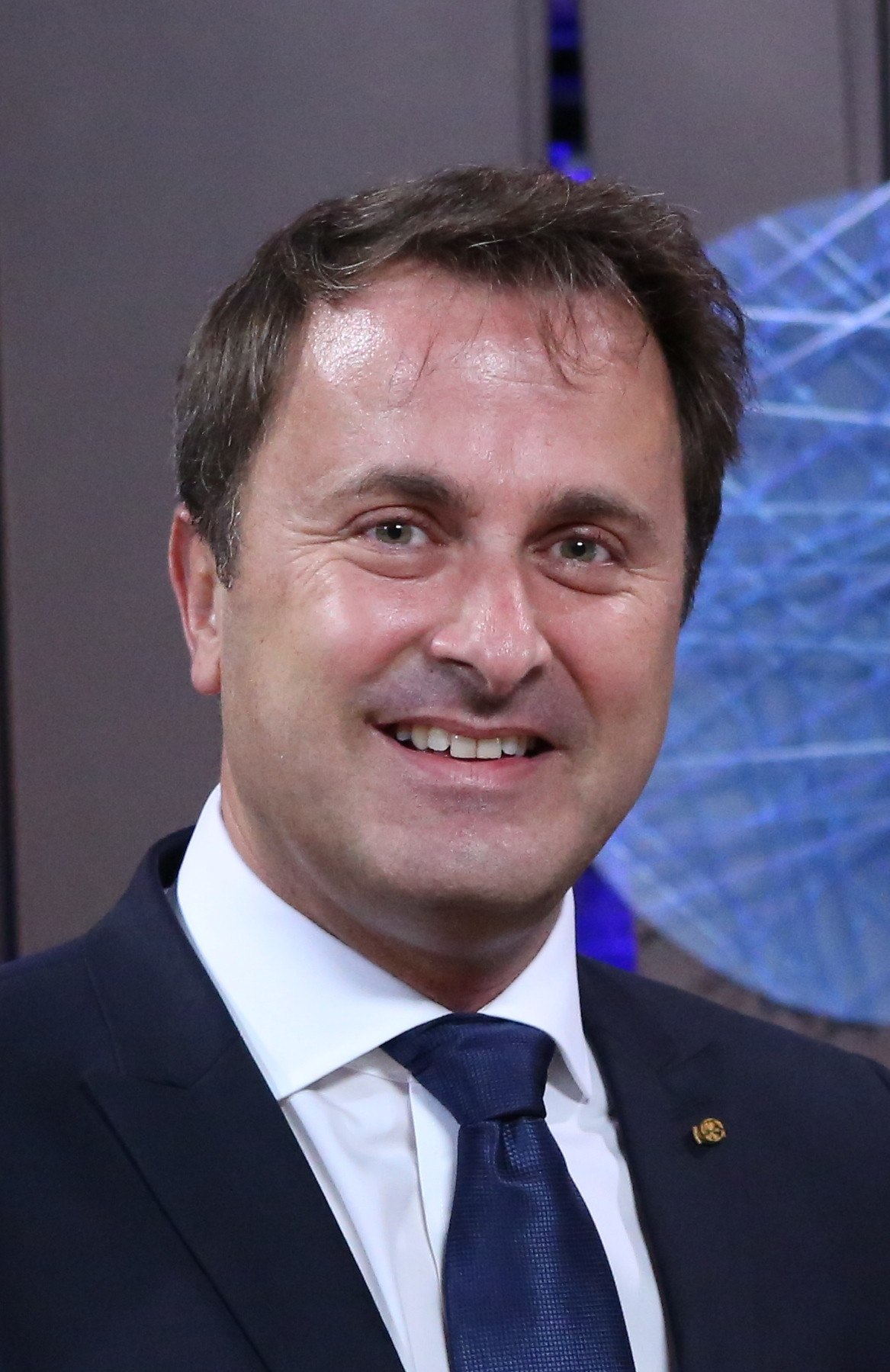
24th Prime Minister of Luxembourg Xavier Bettel

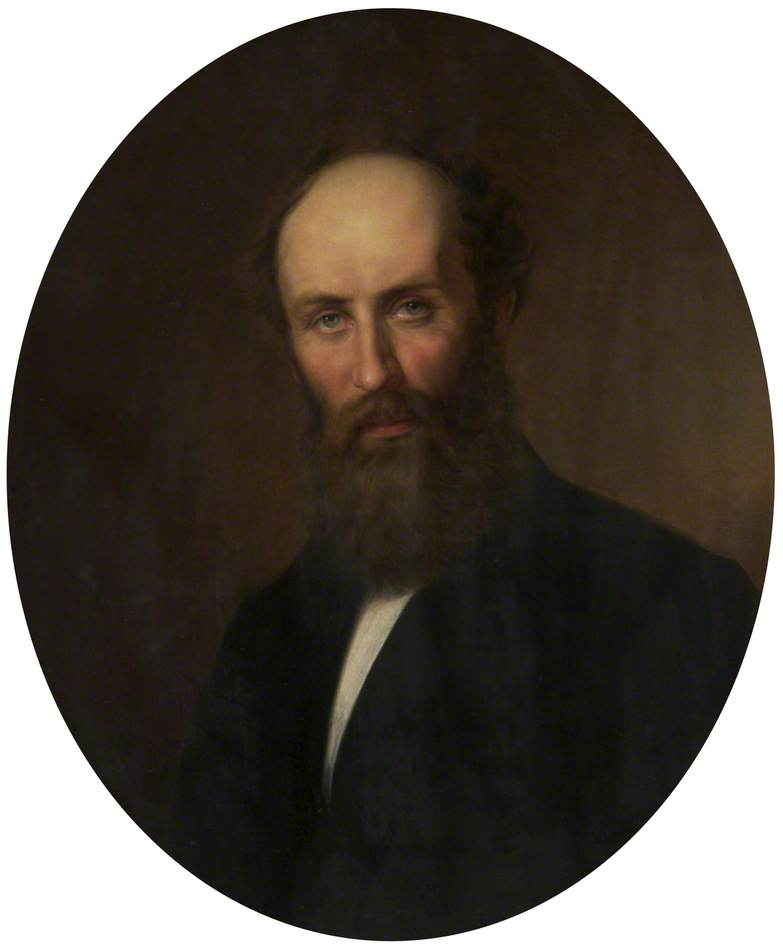
Locomotive designer and builder Charles Beyer

Name	Lifetime	Nationality	Notable as	Notes
Mel B	b. 1975	English	Pop singer (Spice Girls), actor, TV personality	B
Mounir Baatour	b. 1970	Tunisian	Lawyer, LGBT rights activist	G
Jamie Babbit	b. 1970	American	Film and TV director	L
Paul Babeu	b. 1969	American	Politician	G
Leilah Babirye	b. 1985	Ugandan	Artist, LGBT activist	L
Babur	1483–1530	Indian/Mughal	Emperor and founder of the Mughal Empire	B
Babydaddy	b. 1976	American	Rock musician (Scissor Sisters)	G
Judy Baca	b. 1946	American	Artist, activist	L
Peter Bacanovic	b. 1962	American	Stockbroker, defendant in ImClone stock trading case	G
Dirk Bach	1961–2012	German	Comedian, actor, TV personality	G
Don Bachardy	b. 1934	American	Artist	G
Ramona Bachmann	b. 1990	Swiss	Footballer	L
Sir Edmund Backhouse, 2nd Baronet	1873–1944	English	Scholar, Sinologist, linguist	G
Francis Bacon	1909–1992	English	Artist	G
Sir Francis Bacon	1561–1626	English	Philosopher, statesman, scientist, jurist, orator, author	G
Yetide Badaki	b. 1981	Nigerian-American	Actor	B
Babi Badalov	b. 1959	Azerbaijani	Visual artist, poet	G
Marina Rice Bader	b. ?	American	Writer, director, film producer	L
Ruth Badger	b. 1978	English	Reality show contestant, TV presenter, business consultant	L
Dan Baer	b. 1977	American	Politician, diplomat	G
Neal Baer	b. 1955	American	Pediatrician, TV writer, producer	G
Susanne Baer	b. 1964	German	1st openly lesbian elected as a Justice of the Federal Constitutional Court of Germany	L
Joan Baez	b. 1941	American	Folk musician and activist	B
Alice Bag	b. 1958	American	Punk rock musician, author (Bags)	B
Tim Bagley	b. 1957	American	Actor	G
Larry Bagneris Jr.	b. 1946	American	Social and political activist	G
Bai Ling	b. 1966	Chinese-American	Actor	B
Winfried Baijens	b. 1977	Dutch	Journalist, TV presenter	G
Jonathan Bailey	b. 1988	English	Actor	G
Paul Bailey	b. 1937	English	Writer	G
Sheryl Bailey	b. 1966	American	Jazz musician	L
Simon Bailey	1955–1995	English	Anglican priest	G
Amber Mary Bain	b. 1995	English	Indie pop musician (The Japanese House)	L
Diora Baird	b. 1983	American	Actor, model	L
Jon Robin Baitz	b. 1961	American	Playwright, TV producer	G
Zelim Bakaev	1992–2017	Chechen	Singer	G
Christin Baker	b. ?	American	LGBT rights activist	L
Gilbert Baker	1951–2017	American	Artist, gay rights activist, designer of the rainbow flag (1978)	G
Jack Baker	b. 1942	American	Attorney, LGBT rights activist	G
James Robert Baker	1946–1997	American	Author	G
Josephine Baker	1906–1975	American	Entertainer	B
John Roman Baker	b. 1944	English	Playwright	G
Julien Baker	b. 1995	American	Rock musician (Boygenius)	L
Marina Baker	b. 1967	English	Writer, politician	B
Matt Baker	1921–1959	American	Comic book artist and illustrator	G
Sara Josephine Baker	1873–1945	American	Physician, public health pioneer	L
Christine Bakke	b. 1971	American	LGBT rights activist	L
Rohit Bal	b. 1961	Indian	Fashion designer	G
John Balance	1962–2004	English	Rock and experimental musician (Coil)	G
Kuwasi Balagoon	1946–1986	American	Anarchist, member of the Black Liberation Army and Black Panther Party, writer	B
Joe Balass	b. ?	Iraqi-Canadian	Filmmaker	G
Danielle Balbuena (070 Shake)	b. 1997	American	Rapper, singer, songwriter	L
Clare Balding	b. 1971	English	Sports journalist, author	L
Long John Baldry	1941–2005	English	Blues-rock musician	G
Lorenzo Balducci	b. 1982	Italian	Actor	G
Ireland Baldwin	b. 1995	American	Model	B
James Baldwin	1924–1987	American	Writer	G
Oliver Baldwin, 2nd Earl Baldwin of Bewdley	1899–1958	English	Politician	G
Tammy Baldwin	b. 1962	American	Politician, first openly gay U.S. Senator in history	L
Cristóbal Balenciaga	1885–1972	Spanish	Fashion designer	G
Jodi Balfour	b. 1986	South African	Actress	L
Becca Balint	b. 1968	American	Educator, writer, politician (Vermont's 1st female Congresswoman)	L
Alan Ball	b. 1957	American	Screenwriter	G
Jason Ball	b. 1988	Australian	Australian rules football player, mental health advocate, LGBT rights activist	G
Tom Ballard	b. 1989	Australian	Radio presenter and comedian	G
Paolo Ballesteros	b. 1982	Filipino	Actor, comedian, TV host, model	G
Amy Balliett	b. 1982	American	LGBT rights activist	L
Brian Balthazar	b. ?	American	TV personality	G
Bruno Balz	1902–1988	German	Songwriter	G
Orna Banai	b. 1966	Israeli	Actor, comedian, entertainer, politician	L
Canaan Banana	1936–2003	Zimbabwean	1st President of Zimbabwe; jailed for homosexuality	G
Ann Bancroft	b. 1955	American	First woman to reach the North Pole	L
Way Bandy	1941–1986	American	Make-up artist	G
Lisa Banes	1955–2021	American	Actor	L
Herman Bang	1857–1912	Danish	Writer	G
Arne Bang-Hansen	1911–1990	Norwegian	Actor	G
Tallulah Bankhead	1902–1968	American	Actor	B
Azealia Banks	b. 1991	American	Rapper, singer	B
Briana Banks	b. 1978	American	Pornographic actress	B
Christopher Banks	b. 1977	New Zealand	Music producer, journalist	G
Cassandra Bankson	b. 1992	American	Model, internet personality	L
Kaushalya Bannerji	b. ?	Canadian	Poet	L
Ann Bannon	b. 1932	American	Author	L
Porfirio Barba-Jacob	1883–1942	Colombian	Poet, writer	G
Patricia Barber	b. 1956	American	Jazz musician	L
Samuel Barber	1910–1981	American	Classical music composer	G
Shawnacy Barber	1994–2024	Canadian-American	Track and field athlete	G
Jillian Barberie	b. 1966	American	TV host	B
Barbette	1899–1973	American	Female impersonator, high-wire performer, trapeze artist	G
Jesuíta Barbosa	b. 1991	Brazilian	Actor	B
Paris Barclay	b. 1956	American	TV director	G
Virgilio Barco Isakson	b. 1965	Colombian	Economist, political scientist	G
Alexander Bard	b. 1961	Swedish	Pop musician (Army of Lovers), author, lecturer, TV personality, social critic	B
Jean-Pierre Barda	b. 1967	French-Swedish-Israeli	Musician (Army of Lovers), actor	B
Ariela Barer	b. 1998	American	Actor	L
Eduard Bargheer	1901–1979	German	Painter, printmaker	G
Clive Barker	b. 1952	English	Author, film director	G
Greg Barker, Baron Barker of Battle	b. 1966	English	Politician	G
R. H. Barlow	1918–1951	American	Writer, anthropologist	G
Djuna Barnes	1892–1982	American	Writer	B
Fred Barnes	1885–1938	English	Entertainer	G
Hazel Barnes	1915–2008	American	Philosopher	L
Micah Barnes	b. 1960	Canadian	Pop musician	G
Rev. Paul Barnes	b. 1954	American	Clergy	G
Richard Barnes	b. 1947	English	Politician	G
Charlie Barnett	b. 1988	American	Actor	G
James Barnett	b. 1986	American	Activist	G
Jim Barnett	1924–2004	American	Professional wrestling promoter	G
Lisa A. Barnett	1958–2006	American	Science fiction and fantasy writer	L
Samuel Barnett	b. 1986	English	Actor	G
Tim Barnett	b. 1958	New Zealand	Politician	G
Natalie Clifford Barney	1876–1972	American	Writer	L
Bill Baroni	b. 1971	American	Politician, law professor	G
Andrew Barr	b. 1973	Australian	Politician	G
Damian Barr	b. 1976	Scottish	Writer, columnist, playwright	G
James Barr	b. ?	English	Radio DJ, TV presenter, podcaster, comedian	G
Jean Barraqué	1928–1973	French	Classical music composer	G
Katherine Barrell	b. ?	Canadian	Actor	B
Amanda Barrett	b. c. 1979	American	Pop musician (The Ditty Bops)	L
Amanda Barrie	b. 1935	English	Actor	B
María Barrier	b. Unknown	Spanish	Podcaster	L
Josh Barro	b. 1984	American	Journalist	G
John Barrowman	b. 1967	Scottish-American	Actor	G
Drew Barrymore	b. 1975	American	Actor	B
Michael Barrymore	b. 1952	English	Entertainer	G
Yael Bartana	b. 1970	Israeli	Artist, filmmaker, photographer	L
Richmond Barthé	1901–1989	American	Sculptor	G
Daniel Bartholomew-Poyser	b. ?	Canadian	Conductor	G
Paul Bartel	1938–2000	American	Actor, writer, director	G
Roland Barthes	1915–1980	French	Literary theorist	G
Chris Bartlett	b. 1966	American	Activist	G
Murray Bartlett	b. 1971	Australian	Actor	G
Neil Bartlett	b. 1958	English	Playwright	G
Jason Bartlett	b. ?	American	Politician	G
Chucky Bartolo	b. 1993	Maltese	Comedian, drag performer	G
Jamie Barton	b. 1981	American	Opera singer	B
John Barton	b. 1957	Canadian	Poet	G
Matsuo Bashō	1644–1694	Japanese	Poet	G
Jean Basile	1932–1992	French-Canadian	Journalist, novelist	G
Carole Baskin	b. 1961	American	Conservationist, animal rights activist	B
Jean-Michel Basquiat	1960–1988	American	Artist	B
Lance Bass	b. 1979	American	Pop musician (NSYNC)	G
William Bast	1931–2015	American	Screenwriter, author	G
Bruce Bastian	1948–2024	American	Businessman	G
Michael Bastian	b. 1965	American	Fashion designer	G
Shayna Baszler	b. 1980	American	Professional wrestler	B
Alan Bates	1934–2003	English	Actor	B
Katharine Lee Bates	1859–1929	American	Songwriter, social reformer	L
Sigismund Báthory	1573–1613	Hungarian	Prince of Transylvania	G
Baton Bob	b. ?	American	Performance artist	G
Rostam Batmanglij	b. 1983	American	Musician, songwriter, producer (Vampire Weekend & Discovery)	G
Zal Batmanglij	b. 1981	American	Film director, screenwriter	G
Bryan Batt	b. 1963	American	Actor	G
Imma Battaglia	b. 1960	Italian	Politician, LGBT rights activist	L
Deborah Batts	b. 1947	American	Federal District Judge	L
Miriam Batucada	1946–1994	Brazilian	Musician, composer, TV personality	L
André Baudry	1922–2018	French	Writer, academic, activist	G
Gregory Baum	1923–2017	Canadian	Theologian	G
Günter Baum	b. 1960	German	Activist and founder of two Christian ministries in Germany	G
Robert Bauman	b. 1937	American	Politician	G
Ben Baur	b. ?	American	Actor	G
Mark Bautista	b. 1983	Filipino	Singer, actor	B
Bevis Bawa	1909–1992	Sri Lankan	Landscape architect	G
Geoffrey Bawa	1919–2003	Sri Lankan	Architect	G
Bruce Bawer	b. 1956	American	Writer	G
Betty Baxter	b. 1952	Canadian	Politician, athlete	L
Meredith Baxter	b. 1947	American	Actor	L
Stanley Baxter	1926–2025	Scottish	Actor, impressionist	G
Howard Bayless	b. 1965	American	Politician	G
Geoffrey Bayldon	1924–2017	English	Actor	G
Jaime Bayly	b. 1965	Peruvian	Writer	B
Gary Beach	b. 1947	American	Actor	G
Rikki Beadle-Blair	b. 1962	English	Actor, writer, singer, dancer	G
Simon Russell Beale	b. 1961	English	Actor	G
Billy Bean	1964–2024	American	Baseball player	G
Carl Bean	1944–2021	American	Activist, founding prelate of the Unity Fellowship Church Movement	G
James Beard	1903–1985	American	Chef and food writer	G
Amanda Bearse	b. 1958	American	Actor, director	L
Cecil Beaton	1904–1980	English	Photographer, costume designer	G
Stephanie Beatriz	b.1981	Argentine-American	Actor	B
Thomas Beattie	b. 1986	English	Footballer	G
Ryan Beatty	b. 1995	American	Pop singer, musician, YouTube personality	G
Bianca Beauchamp	b. 1977	Canadian	Adult model	B
William Lygon, 7th Earl Beauchamp	1872–1938	English	Peer of the Realm, politician, Lord Warden of the Cinque Ports	B
Christophe Beaugrand	b. 1977	French	Journalist, TV presenter, radio host	G
Edward Douglas-Scott-Montagu, 3rd Baron Montagu of Beaulieu	1926–2015	English	Peer of the Realm, Conservative politician, founder of National Motor Museum	B
Germaine Beaulieu	b. 1949	Canadian	Writer	L
Binkie Beaumont	1908–1973	English-Welsh	Theatre manager, producer	G
Clément Beaune	b. 1981	French	Politician	G
Simone de Beauvoir	1908–1986	French	Author, philosopher	B
Nils Bech	b. 1981	Norwegian	Pop musician	G
Alison Bechdel	b. 1960	American	Cartoonist	L
Gad Beck	1923–2012	German-Israeli	Holocaust survivor, author	G
Julian Beck	1925–1985	American	Actor, director and writer	B
Martha Beck	b. 1962	American	Sociologist and life coach	L
Volker Beck	b. 1960	German	Politician	G
Albrecht Becker	1906–2002	German	Photographer	G
William Beckford	1760–1844	English	Novelist, art collector	B
Antoine Bédard	b. 1978	Canadian	Musician	G
Sybille Bedford	1911–2006	German-English	Writer	B
Ximena Bedregal	b. 1951	Chilean-Bolivian	Architect, writer, theoretician, professor, editor, photographer	L
Lucius Beebe	1902–1966	American	Photographer, railroad historian	G
Vicky Beeching	b. 1979	English	Musician and religious commentator	L
Brittany "Britt" Benn	b. 1989	Canadian	Rugby union player	L
Jolyn Beer	b. 1994	German	Sports shooter	L
Madison Beer	b. 1999	American	Singer	B
Bet van Beeren	1902–1967	Dutch	Early LGBT inclusive café owner, Dutch WWII resistance supporter	L
Eve Beglarian	b. 1958	American	Contemporary classical music performer-composer	L
David Begnaud	b. 1983	American	Journalist, news correspondent	G
Chad Beguelin	b. 1969	American	Playwright and lyricist	G
Brendan Behan	1923–1964	Irish	Author, poet, playwright	B
Marcus Behmer	1879–1958	German	Artist, illustrator	G
Aphra Behn	1640–1689	English	Writer	B
Mark Behr	1963–2015	Tanzanian-South African	Author	G
Miriam Beizana Vigo	b. 1990	Spanish	Writer, literary critic	L
Jessica Bejarano	b. ?	American	Founder and conductor of the San Francisco Philharmonic	L
Maurice Béjart	1927–2007	French-Swiss	Ballet dancer, choreographer, opera director	G
McKinley Belcher III	b. 1984	American	Actor	G
Billy-Ray Belcourt	b. ?	Canadian	Poet, scholar, and author	G
Frieda Belinfante	1904–1995	Dutch	Classical musician and conductor, member of the Dutch resistance	L
Bell	b. 2000	Swedish	Pop singer	B
Allan Bell	b. 1947	Manx	Chief Minister of the Isle of Man	G
Andy Bell	b. 1964	English	Pop musician (Erasure)	G
Arthur Bell	1939–1984	American	Journalist (Village Voice); founding member of the Gay Activists Alliance	G
Charles Bell	1935–1995	American	Painter	G
Jadin Bell	1997–2013	American	Youth whose suicide lead to gay bullying awareness	G
John Bell	b. 1997	Scottish	Actor	G
Simone Bell	b. ?	American	Politician	L
Dodie Bellamy	b. 1951	American	Writer, journalist, editor	B
Alice Bellandi	b. 1998	Italian	Judoka	L
Dario Bellezza	1944–1996	Italian	Poet, author, playwright	G
David Belliard	b. 1978	French	Politician	G.
Jason Bellini	b. 1975	American	Journalist	G
Paul Bellini	b. 1963	Canadian	Comedy writer	G
Ada Bello	b. 1933	Cuban-American	LGBT rights activist, medical laboratory researcher	L
Maria Bello	b. 1967	American	Actor	B
Linda Bellos	b. 1950	British	Black and LGBT activist, former London politician	L
Sotiria Bellou	1921–1997	Greek	Rebetiko musician	L
Max Bemis	b. 1984	American	Rock singer (Say Anything)	B
Lisa Ben	1921–2015	American	Editor, author, songwriter	L
Jacinto Benavente	1866–1954	Spanish	Dramatist	G
Carlos Benavides Vega	1931–1999	Ecuadorian	Poet, playwright	G
Birgitt Bender	b. 1956	German	Politician	L
Bruce Benderson	b. 1946	American	Writer	G
Ruth Benedict	1887–1948	American	Anthropologist, folklorist	B
Perris Benegas	b. 1995	American	Freestyle BMX cyclist	L
Brenda Benet	1945–1982	American	Actor	B
Igor Benevenuto	b. 1980	Brazilian	Football referee	G
Féral Benga	1906–1957	Senegalese	Dancer	G
Jessica Benham	b. 1990	American	Politician, disability rights activist	B
Gio Benitez	b. 1985	American	TV personality	G
George Benjamin	b. 1960	English	Composer	G
David Benkof	b. 1970	American	Political commentator	G
Henry Grey Bennet	1777–1836	English	Politician	G
Alan Bennett	b. 1934	English	Playwright, actor	B
Bryce Bennett	b. 1984	American	Politician	G
Declan Bennett	b. 1981	English	Pop singer (Point Break), actor, playwright	G
Jill Bennett	b. 1975	American	Actor	L
Jonathan Bennett	b. 1981	American	Actor	G
Liz Bennett	b. 1982	American	Politician	B
Michael Bennett	1943–1987	American	Creator, director, choreographer	G
Richard Rodney Bennett	1936–2012	English	Composer, pianist	G
Taylor Bennett	b. 1996	American	Hip-hop artist	B
Sadie Benning	b. 1973	American	Feminist visual artist	L
Bob Benny	1926–2011	Belgian	Singer, musical theatre performer	G
Miriam Ben-Shalom	b. 1948	American	Educator, activist, former Staff Sergeant in the U.S. Army; the first openly gay person to be reinstated after being discharged under the military's policy excluding homosexuals from military service	L
A. C. Benson	1862–1925	English	Essayist, poet, author, academic	G
Guy Benson	b. 1985	American	Columnist, commentator, political pundit	G
Trevor Bentham	b. 1943	English	Screenwriter, partner of actor Nigel Hawthorne	G
Gladys Bentley	1907–1960	American	Blues musician	L
Anita Berber	1899–1928	German	Dancer, actor	B
A. Scott Berg	b. 1949	American	Writer	G
Bolette Berg	1872–1944	Norwegian	Photographer	L
Marianne Berg	b. 1954	Swedish	Politician	L
Sandon Berg	b. 1971	American	Film producer, screenwriter	G
Sturla Berg-Johansen	b. 1967	Norwegian	Comedian, actor, TV personality	G
Pierre Bergé	1930–2017	French	Businessman, co-founder of fashion label Yves Saint Laurent	G
Ann-Katrin Berger	b. 1990	German	Footballer	L
Helmut Berger	1944–2023	Austrian	Actor	B
Marco Berger	b. 1977	Argentine	Film director	G
Cyrano de Bergerac	1619–1655	French	French dramatist, duelist	G
David Bergman	b. 1950	American	Writer	G
Kajsa Bergqvist	b. 1976	Swedish	High jumper	B
Guðbergur Bergsson	b. 1932	Icelandic	Writer	G
Bobby Berk	b. 1981	American	Interior designer, TV host	G
Humphry Berkeley	1926–1994	English	Politician	G
Richard Berkowitz	b. 1955	American	Author, activist	G
Nate Berkus	b. 1971	American	Interior designer	G
Greg Berlanti	b. 1972	American	TV writer, producer	G
Thomas Berling	b. 1979	Norwegian	Footballer	G
Josh Berman	b. 1970	American	TV writer, producer	G
Rodney Berman	b. 1969	Scottish	Politician	G
Juan Manuel Bernal	b. 1967	Mexican	Actor	G
Éric Bernard	b. 1982	French	Actor	G
Christopher Bernau	1940–1989	American	Actor	G
Nicole Berner	b. 1965	American–Israeli	Lawyer	L
Sandra Bernhard	b. 1955	American	Comedian	B
Leonard Bernstein	1918–1990	American	Classical music conductor and composer	B
Richard Bernstein	1939–2002	American	Artist	G
Samuel Bernstein	b. 1970	American	Writer	G
Michael Berresse	b. 1964	American	Actor, choreographer	G
John Berry	b. 1959	American	Former government official	G
Randy W. Berry	b. 1965	American	Diplomat	G
McKenzie Berryhill	b. 1993	American	Soccer player	L
Mildred J. Berryman	1901–1972	American	Researcher, photographer, mineral merchant	L
Leo Bersani	1931–2022	American	Literary theorist	G
Gabriele Bertaccini	b. 1985	Italian	Chef, TV personality	G
Al Berto	1948–1997	Portuguese	Poet, artist	G
Carolyn Bertozzi	b. 1966	American	Chemist, Nobel Prize winner	L
Allan Berube	1946–2007	American	Military historian	G
Betty Berzon	1928–2006	American	Author, psychotherapist	L
Scott Bessent	b. 1962	American	Investor, philanthropist	G
Lorraine Bethel	b. ?	American	Feminist poet, author	L
Magnus Betnér	b. 1974	Swedish	Comedian, TV host	B
Xavier Bettel	b. 1973	Luxembourgish	Politician, lawyer, 24th Prime Minister of Luxembourg	G
Sarah Bettens	b. 1972	Belgian	Rock musician (K's Choice)	L
Clive Betts	b. 1950	English	Politician	G
Willem van Beusekom	1947–2006	Dutch	TV presenter, radio DJ	G
Ole von Beust	b. 1955	German	Politician	G
Charles Beyer	1813–1876	German–British	Locomotive designer and builder	G
Thomas Bezucha	b. 1964	American	Screenwriter, director	G
Satya Bhabha	b. 1983	British	Actor	G
Deepak Bhargava	b. ?	American	Immigration reform advocate	G
Dinesh Bhugra	b. 1952	Indian	Psychiatrist, academic	G

== See also ==
- List of gay, lesbian or bisexual people
- homosexuality
