= Vigo (disambiguation) =

Vigo is a city in Pontevedra, Spain.

== Places ==
- Associated with the Spanish city:
  - Vigo (comarca), surrounding Vigo
  - Vigo metropolitan area centred on Vigo
  - Ria de Vigo, an estuary
- Vigo Village, Kent, England, a village and civil parish
- Vigo, Walsall, West Midlands, England
- Vigo, Birtley, Tyne and Wear, England
- Vigo County, Indiana, United States
  - Vigo, Indiana, an unincorporated community
- Vigo Township, Knox County, Indiana
- Vigo, Ohio, United States, an unincorporated community

== People and fictional characters ==
- Vigo (name), a list of people and fictional characters with the surname or given name

== Other uses ==
- HMS Vigo, four Royal Navy ships
- Battle of Vigo (disambiguation)
- University of Vigo, in Spain
- Vigo Collegiate Institute, a former private school in Terre Haute, Indiana
- Vigo RC, a rugby club based in the city of Vigo
- CD Vigo FS, a former futsal club based in the city
- Vigo Ordnance Plant, a former US Army weapons plant in Indiana
- Vigo Street, London
- Seventh generation of the Toyota Hilux series of commercial vehicles, also known as Vigo in some countries
- Vigo, an Indiana-based producer of pharmaceuticals for animals, now Zoetis
- Vigo Video, a short-form video app developed by ByteDance

== See also ==
- Vigo di Fassa, a municipality in Trentino, Italy
- Viggo, a given name
- Wigo (disambiguation)
