= Vigo (name) =

Vigo is a masculine given name and an Italian surname, the latter probably derived from the Latin word vicus (neighbourhood or settlement).

It may refer to:

== People ==
- Vigo Carlund (born 1946), Swedish businessman
- V. A. Demant (1893–1983), English priest, theologian and social commentator
- Vigo Madsen (1889–1979), Danish gymnast
- Viggo Mortensen (born 1958), American actor, author, musician, photographer, poet, and painter
- Alejandra Vigo (born 1957), Argentine trade unionist
- Alex Vigo (born 1999), Argentine footballer
- Élida Vigo (born 1944), Argentine politician
- Esteban Vigo (born 1955), Spanish retired footballer and coach
- Facundo Vigo (born 1999), Uruguayan footballer
- Francis Vigo (1747–1836), Italian supporter of the American Revolution
- Giovanni da Vigo (1450–1525), Italian surgeon
- Green Vigo (1950–2026), South African rugby union and rugby league footballer
- Íñigo Méndez de Vigo (born 1956), Spanish politician
- Jean Vigo (1905–1934), French film director
- Miriam Beizana Vigo (born 1990), Spanish writer and literary critic

== Fictional characters ==
- Vigo the Carpathian, villain of the film Ghostbusters II
- Vigo, a villain in the Japanese manga series Psyren
- Jason Vigo, in the Star Trek: The Next Generation episode "Bloodlines"

== See also ==
- Viggo, a given name
