= Wiggo =

Wiggo may refer to:

- Wiggo Hanssen (1923–2007), Norwegian speed skater
- Bradley Wiggins (born 1980), British former cyclist nicknamed "Wiggo"

== See also ==
- Viggo (given name)
- Wigo (disambiguation)
