= Furbo =

Furbo may refer to:

- Furbo, County Galway, a village in Ireland.
- Furbo, Smedjebacken, a village and area in Dalarna, Sweden.
- Furbo, an interactive pet camera developed by the Seattle-based pet tech manufacturer Tomofun.
