= Smedjebacken =

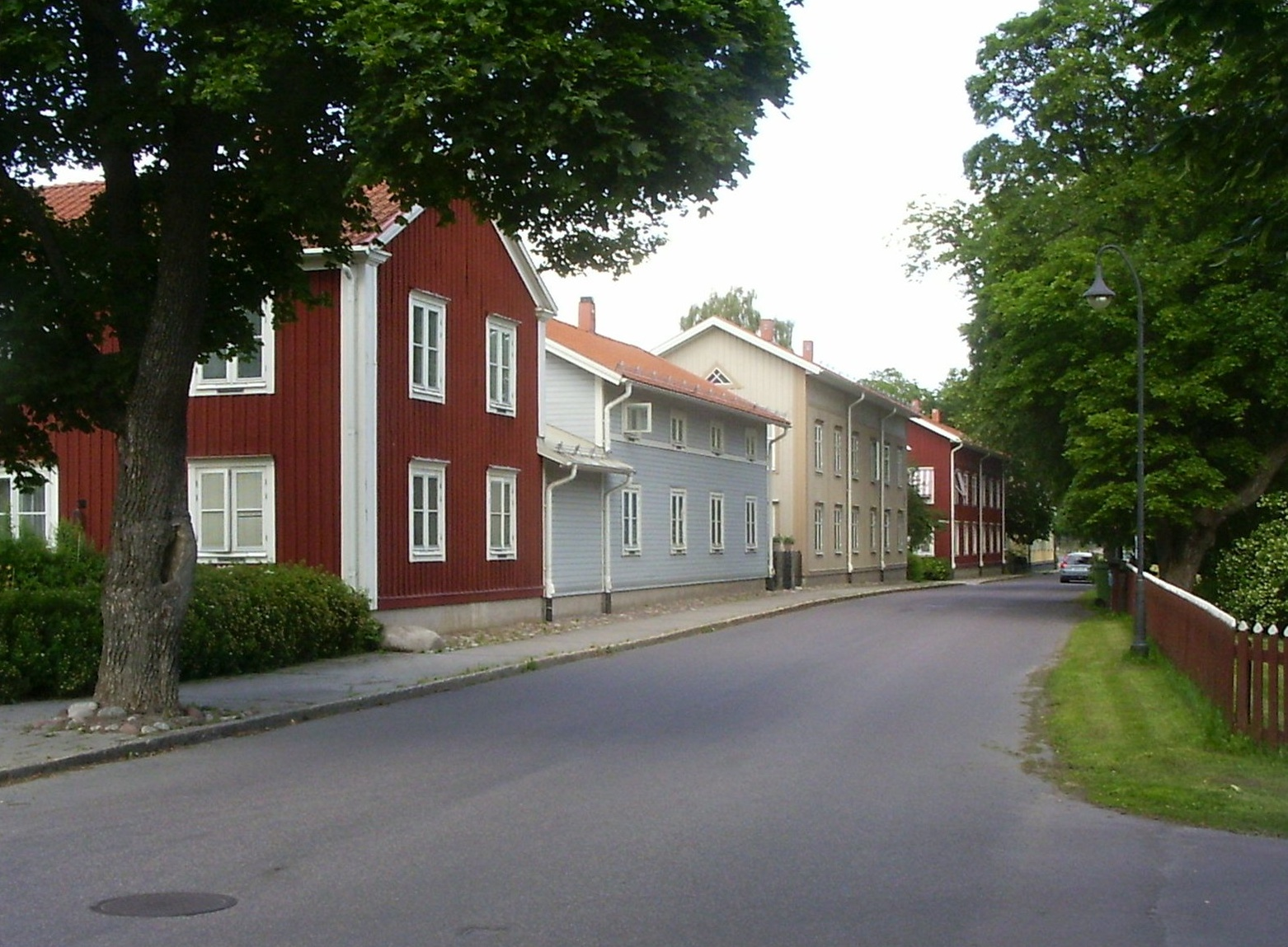
- Smedjebacken Church Street in July 2009

- Coat of arms

- Location within Dalarna Location within Sweden
- Coordinates: 60°08′N 15°25′E
- Country: Sweden
- Province: Dalarna
- County: Dalarna County
- Municipality: Smedjebacken Municipality

Area
  - Total: 6.36 km^{2} (2.46 sq mi)

Population (31 December 2010)
  - Total: 5,100
  - Density: 802/km^{2} (2,080/sq mi)
- Time zone: UTC+1 (CET)
  - Summer (DST): UTC+2 (CEST)

Smedjebacken is a locality and the seat of Smedjebacken Municipality, Dalarna County, Sweden, with 5,100 inhabitants in 2010.

Geographically, the town Smedjebacken is situated by the lake Barken, with an area of 34 km^{2} (13 sq mi), which in turn belongs to the Kolbäcksån stream-system, which drains into lake Mälaren to the south-east.

== Notable people ==
- Nils Ekholm, Swedish meteorologist, physicist and explorer
- Hans Heyerdahl, Norwegian painter
- Maria Keohane, Swedish soprano
- Mia Brunell, Swedish businesswoman
- Karl Edvard Laman, Swedish missionary and ethnographer

== Sports ==
The following sports clubs are located in Smedjebacken:

- Smedjebackens FK
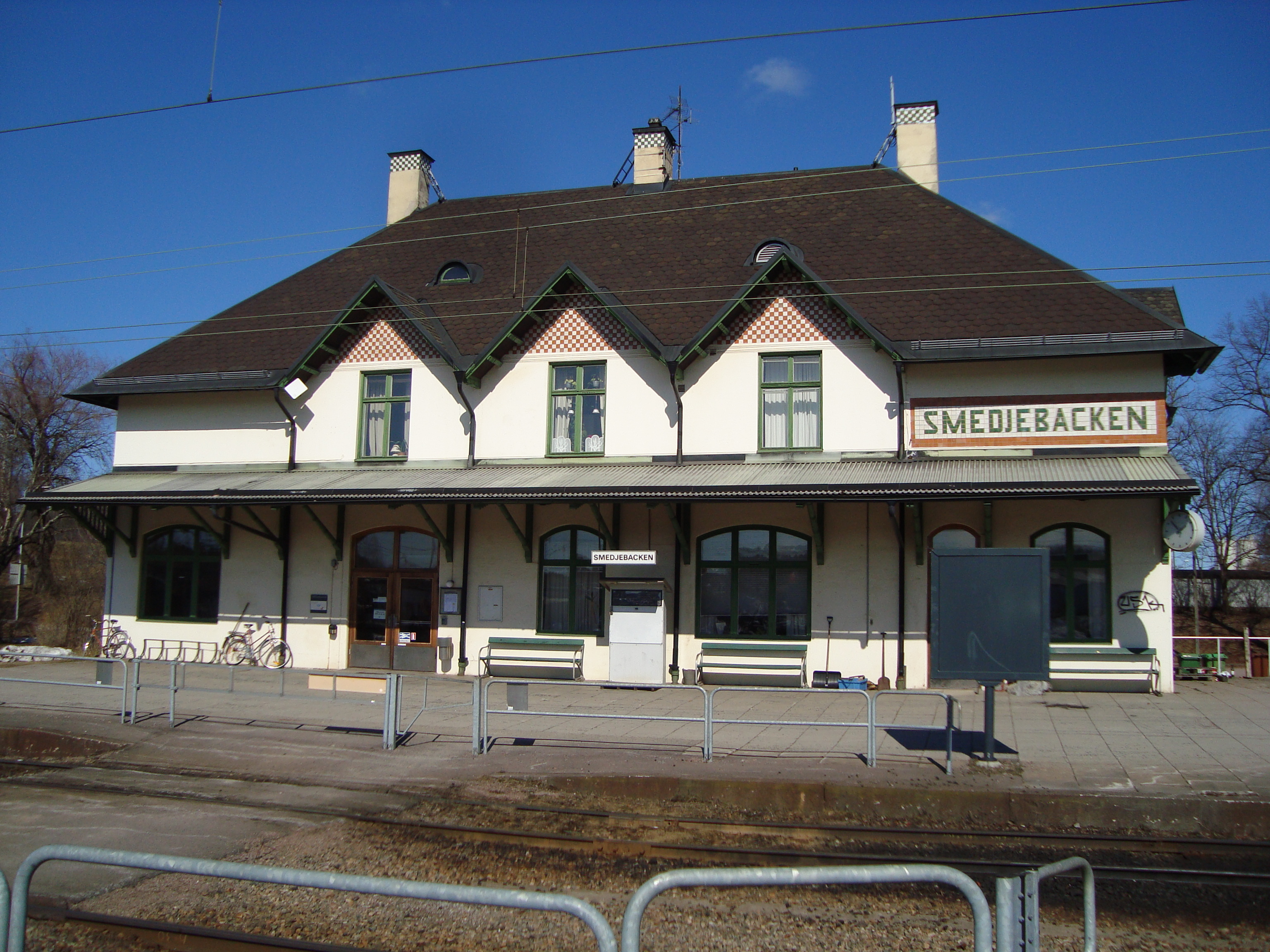
Smedjebacken railway station

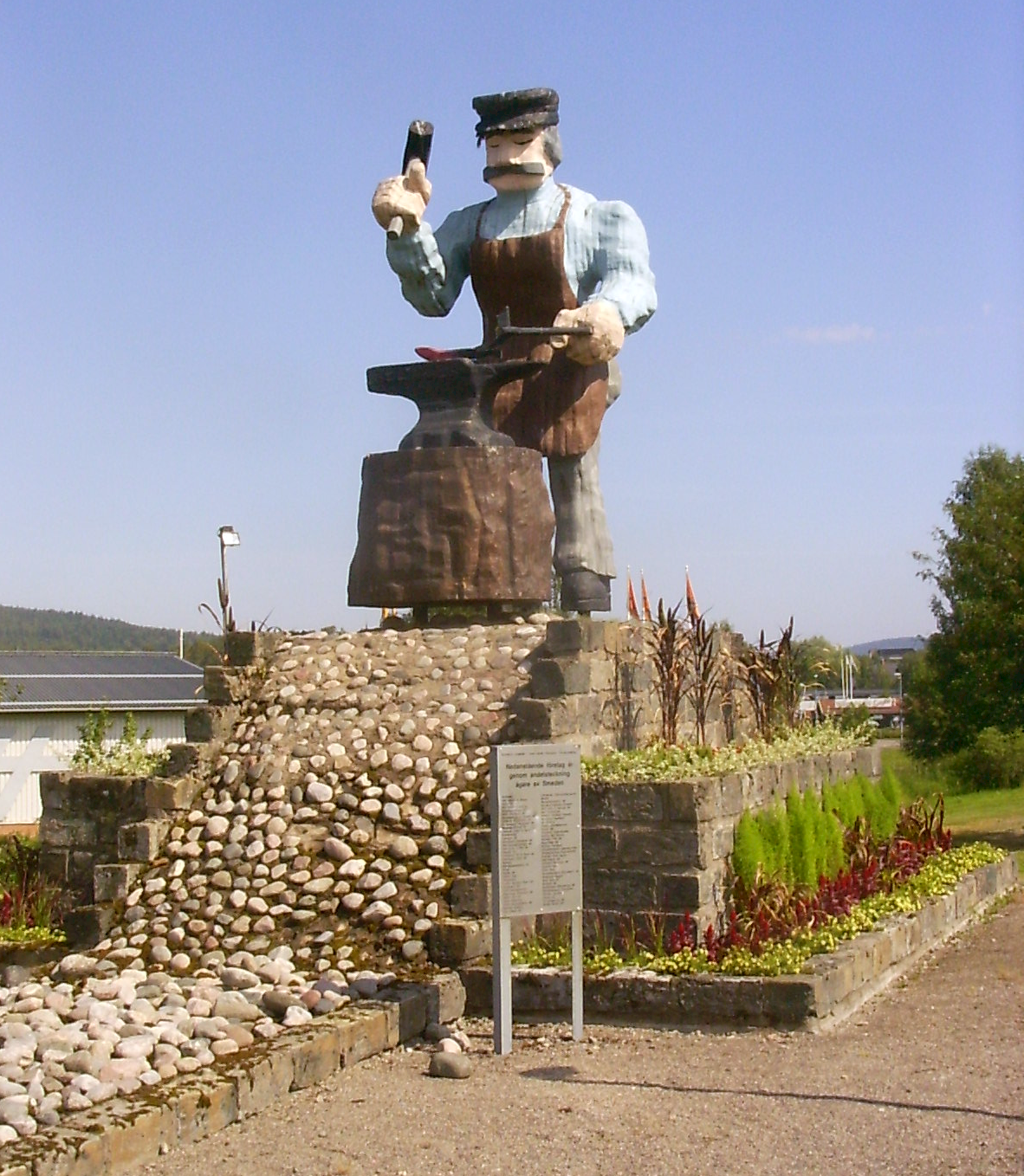
Sculpture by Sven-Göran Niklasson

== See also ==
- Furbo, Smedjebacken
