= Vigo Carlund =

Swedish businessman

Chairman of Tele2
- In office 2006–2010

CEO of Investment AB Kinnevik
- In office 1999 – 1 August 2006
- Succeeded by: Mia Brunell

Personal details
- Born: 1946 (age 79–80)
- Occupation: Businessman

Vigo Carlund (born 1946) is a Swedish businessman. He was a close associate of Jan Stenbeck and was rewarded by being appointed CEO of Investment AB Kinnevik in 1999. In 2006 it was revealed that he would be stepping down from the executive side of business after 38 years in the Stenbeck group of companies. He was replaced by Mia Brunell, another Stenbeck veteran, on August 1, 2006. From 2006 to 2010, he served as chairman of the board of Tele2.
