= Karl Edvard Laman =

Swedish missionary and ethnographer

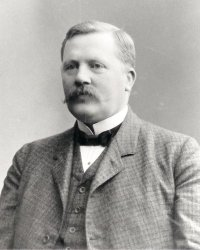
- Title: Missionary

Personal life
- Born: 1867 Smedjebacken, Sweden
- Died: 1944 (aged 76–77) Sweden
- Resting place: Stjärnorp
- Notable work: Translation of the Bible to Kikongo

Religious life
- Religion: Mission Covenant Church of Sweden
- School: Mission Covenant Church of Sweden

Senior posting
- Post: Kingdom of Kongo
- Period in office: 1891–1919

Karl Edvard Laman (born Karl Edvard Ersson) (1867–1944) was a Swedish missionary and ethnographer active in Kingdom of Kongo during the period of 1891 through 1919. Laman and his wife collected a large group of ethnographic materials and this collection of more than 2,000 pieces is the most comprehensive of that brought back by the Swedish missionaries of his time.

== Early years ==
Karl was born in Smedjebacken, Sweden in 1867. His father, Gustaf Ersson worked at a mill, and his mother, Christina Ulrika Wallin, was a maid at the vicarage. While young, he worked as a gardener in Stockholm. Karl's studies were paid for by a sister of his grandmother, Sofia Eriksson, who married the restaurateur Carl Frederick Laman of Västerås who had inherited a small fortune. During this time, Karl changed his surname to Laman. After graduating from a school in Västerås, Karl registered with the Mission Covenant Church of Sweden missionary school in Kristinehamn in 1888. Two years later, in 1890, he was ordained a missionary.

== Career ==
In 1891, Laman emigrated to the Congo on a mission tour and stayed until 1919 . During his time in Kongo, he combined his ministry with linguistic study which resulted in numerous books, dissertations, and an almost complete translation of the Bible to Kikongo, the original language of the region and today the main language in Angola and Democratic Republic of the Congo. His most notable work was the Kikongo-Français dictionary of about 60,000 words completed during expeditions to minority groups in the region. He also published Grammar of the Kongo Language (Kikongo) in 1912. In order to study the local languages and social systems, Laman worked with young, local, Bakongo evangelists. In 1912, these evangelists assisted Laman with his survey questionnaires in Kikongo, developed to map out the languages and cultures of Kongo groups.

While in the Congo, Laman collected everyday objects, insects, bird eggs and animal skins. Notes on some mammals collected in the Congo Free State by the Swedish missionary, K.E. Laman, written by the Swedish zoologist Einar Lönnberg, was published in 1908. Laman's collection of twelve human skulls are now with the Swedish Museum of Natural History while his collection of Nkisi is with the Museum of Ethnography, Sweden.

Laman received the Linn Medal from the Royal Swedish Academy of Sciences, and an honorary doctorate from Uppsala University.

== Personal life ==
Laman and his wife, Selma (née Carlson; 1862–1936), are buried at Stjärnorp.

== Partial works ==
- 1899, Nkanda wabilekwa bianza uzayulwanga mpangulu ye nkadulu au: Kimfumu kiabibulu ye minti ye bititi ye matadi
- 1905, Nkand' a nzambi vo masonukwa manlongo mabundane nkanda mia luwawanu luankulu ye luampa
- 1936, Dictionnaire kikongo-français, avec une étude phonétique décrivant les dialectes les plus importants de la langue dite Kikongo (translated: "Kikongo-French dictionary with phonetic study describing the major dialects of the language known as Kikongo.")
