= Maria Keohane =

Swedish soprano (born 1971)

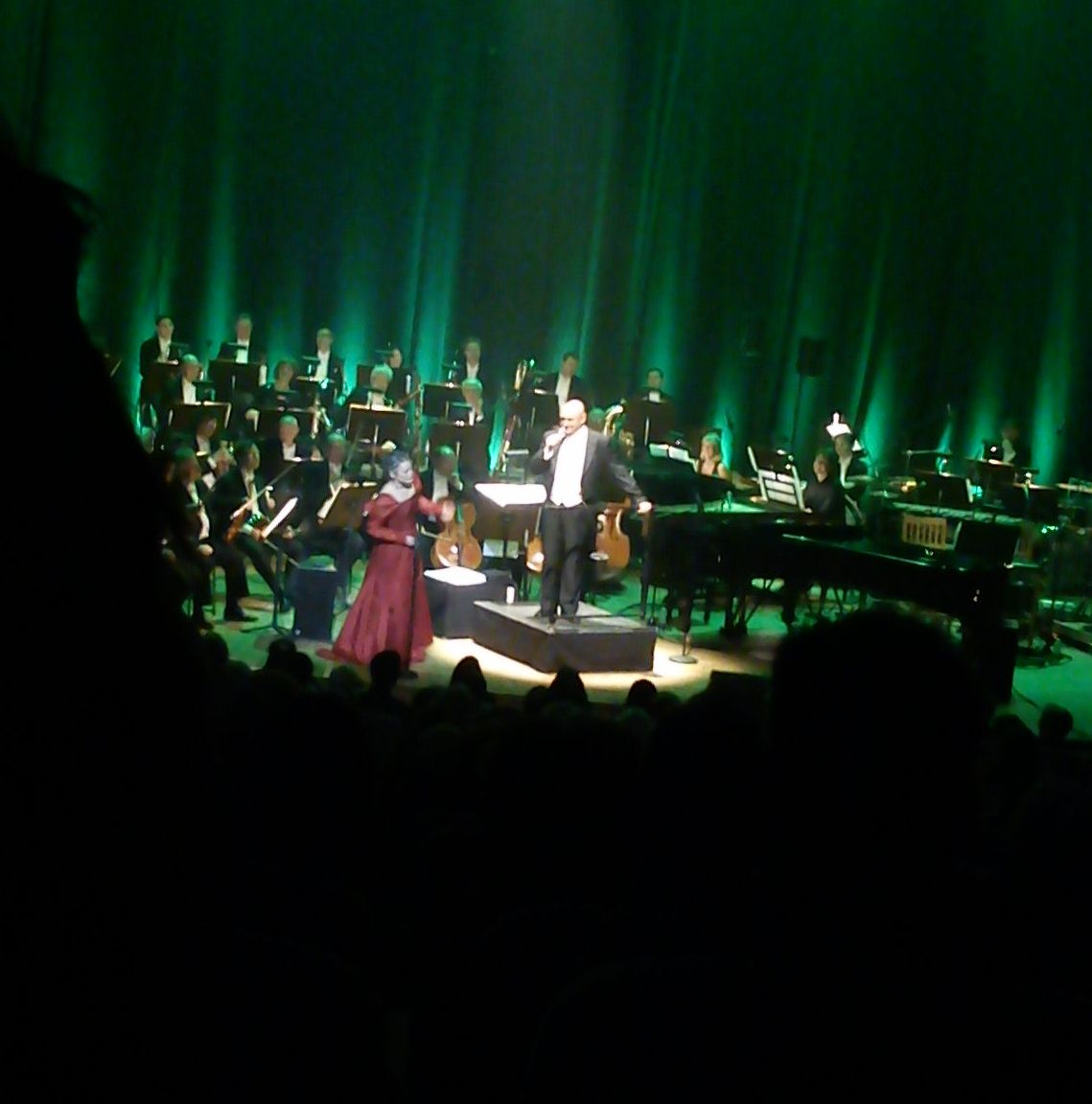
- Keohane performing with Hans Ek in 2011
- Born: 13 May 1971 (age 55); Manchester, UK
- Education: Royal Swedish Academy of Music
- Occupation: Soprano

Maria Keohane (born 13 May 1971) is a Swedish soprano who has performed at festivals in Europe and made many recordings, especially of sacred music.

== Life and career ==
Keohane was born in Manchester to a Swedish mother and an Irish father. She and her mother moved to Smedjebacken in Sweden when she was five. She still resides there. She had many fiddlers in the family on her mother's side, and started playing the violin at the age of nine. She also sang in the local church children's choir. Keohane planned to become a veterinarian, and interned at Falu djursjukhus, where she was offered a job, but was encouraged to pursue a career in music. She studied at the Falun Conservatory, the University of Gothenburg and the Royal Danish Academy of Music in Copenhagen.

In 1998 and 1999, she performed with the Texas Bach Choir and baroque trumpet virtuoso Niklas Eklund as a guest artist. She won a prize at the international van Wassenaer competition in 2000 and has received a number of scholarships from the Royal Swedish Academy of Music. In 2009 and 2010, she performed with the European Union Baroque Orchestra. Reviewer Lindsay Kemp from Gramophone noted about a collection of Baroque arias: "Keohane shows sparkling virtuosity in Jauchzet Gott, but also affecting vulnerability in Ferrandini's poignant Il pianto di Maria". In 2012, she performed with the RTE Vanbrugh String Quartet. Since 2013, she has recorded 24 works, mostly cantatas, in the Netherlands Bach Society's "All of Bach" project. In 2014, she received the Jussi Björling scholarship. In 2016, she performed at the Festival Musikdorf Ernen.

Keohane teaches at the Falun Conservatory.

== Discography ==
- Magnificat, Johann Sebastian Bach / Maria Keohane, Anna Zander, Carlos Mena, Hans Jörg Mammel, Stephan MacLeod, Francis Jacob, Ricercar Consort, Philippe Pierlot, Mirare 2009
- Passion Selon Saint Jean, BWV 245, Bach – Maria Keohane, Carlos Mena, Hans Jörg Mammel, Ricercar Consort, Jan Kobow, Matthias Vieweg, Stephan MacLeod, Ricercar Consort, Philippe Pierlot, Mirare-MIR 136 2011
- Handel: Cantatas, Arias, Orchestral Pieces – Maria Keohane, European Union Baroque Orchestra / Lars Ulrik Mortensen, ERP 6212–79 minutes
- Handel: L'Allegro, il Peneroso ed il Moderato – Peter Neumann, cond; Maria Keohane, Julia Doyle, Benjamin Hulett, Andreas Wolf, Kölner Kammerchor, Collegium Cartusianum (period instruments), Carus 83.395 (2 CDs: 119:18)
- Beethoven: Mass in C; Cherubini: Sciant Gentes – Maria Keohane, Margot Oitzinger, Thomas Hobbs, Sebastian Noack, Kammerchor Stuttgart & Hofkapelle / Frieder Bernius, Carus 83.295, 48 minute
- Handel: Water Music – Maria Keohane, European Union Baroque Orchestra, Lars Ulrik Mortensen (cond), ERP 6212, 2013
- Joy & Sorrow Unmasked: Arias and Orchestral works by Bach and Handel – Maria Keohane, European Union Baroque Orchestra, Lars Ulrik Mortensen (cond)
- Mass In B minor, Bach – Maria Keohane, Joanne Lunn, Alex Potter, Jan Kobow, Peter Harvey, Concerto Copenhagen, Lars Ulrik Mortensen, 777-851 2015
- Membra Jesu Nostri, Dieterich Buxtehude – Maria Keohane, Hanna Bayodi-Hirt, Carlos Mena, Jeffrey Thompson, Matthias Vieweg, Ricercar Consort, Philippe Pierlot, 2018
- Bach: Cantatas 21 & 76, organ chorales – Bernard Foccroule (organ). Maria Keohane, Carlos Mena, Julian Pregardien, Matthias Vieweg, Collegium Vocale Gent; Ricercar Consort / Philippe Pierlot, Mirare 490, 83 minutes
- Bach: Soli Deo Gloria – Philippe Pierlot (cond.), Maria Keohane, Carlos Mena, Julian Prégardien, Matthias Vieweg, Bernard Foccroulle, Mirare, 2021
- Beethoven: Irish Songs, Maria Keohane, Ricercar Consort, Mirare 540, 57 minutes
