= Smedjebackens FK =

Swedish football club

- Full name: Smedjebackens Fotbollklubb
- Founded: 1977
- Ground: Herosvallen; Smedjebacken; Sweden
- Chairman: Roger Sjöberg
- League: Division 4 Dalarna
Home colours

Smedjebackens FK is a Swedish football club located in Smedjebacken.

== Background ==
Smedjebackens FK currently plays in Division 4 Dalarna which is the sixth tier of Swedish football. They play their home matches at the Herosvallen in Smedjebacken.

The club is affiliated to Dalarnas Fotbollförbund. Smedjebackens FK have competed in the Svenska Cupen on 10 occasions and have played 18 matches in the competition.

== Season to season ==
Season	Level	Division	Section	Position	Movements
2006*	Tier 6	Division 4	Dalarna	1st	Promoted
2007	Tier 5	Division 3	Södra Norrland	9th	Relegation Playoffs – Relegated
2008	Tier 6	Division 4	Dalarna	4th	
2009	Tier 6	Division 4	Dalarna	4th	
2010	Tier 6	Division 4	Dalarna	10th	
2011	Tier 6	Division 4	Dalarna	10th	

* League restructuring in 2006 resulted in a new division being created at Tier 3 and subsequent divisions dropping a level.
