= Wigo =

Wigo or WIGO may refer to:

- Wolf Wigo, American water polo player
- Wigo, Bishop of Brandenburg, 992–1018; see Feuchtwangen § History
- Toyota Agya, a city car known as the Toyota Wigo in the Philippines, Sri Lanka and Brunei market.
- WIGO (AM), a radio station at 1570 AM licensed to Morrow, Georgia
- WIGO-FM, a radio station at 104.9 FM licensed to White Stone, Virginia

== See also ==
- Wiggo (disambiguation)
- Vigo (disambiguation)
