= Battle of Vigo =

The Battle of Vigo may refer to:

- Battle of Vigo Bay, which took place in 1702 as part of the War of the Spanish Succession
- Capture of Vigo, a British operation to capture the city in 1719 as part of the War of the Quadruple Alliance
