= Babi Badalov =

Azerbaijani visual artist and poet (born 1959)

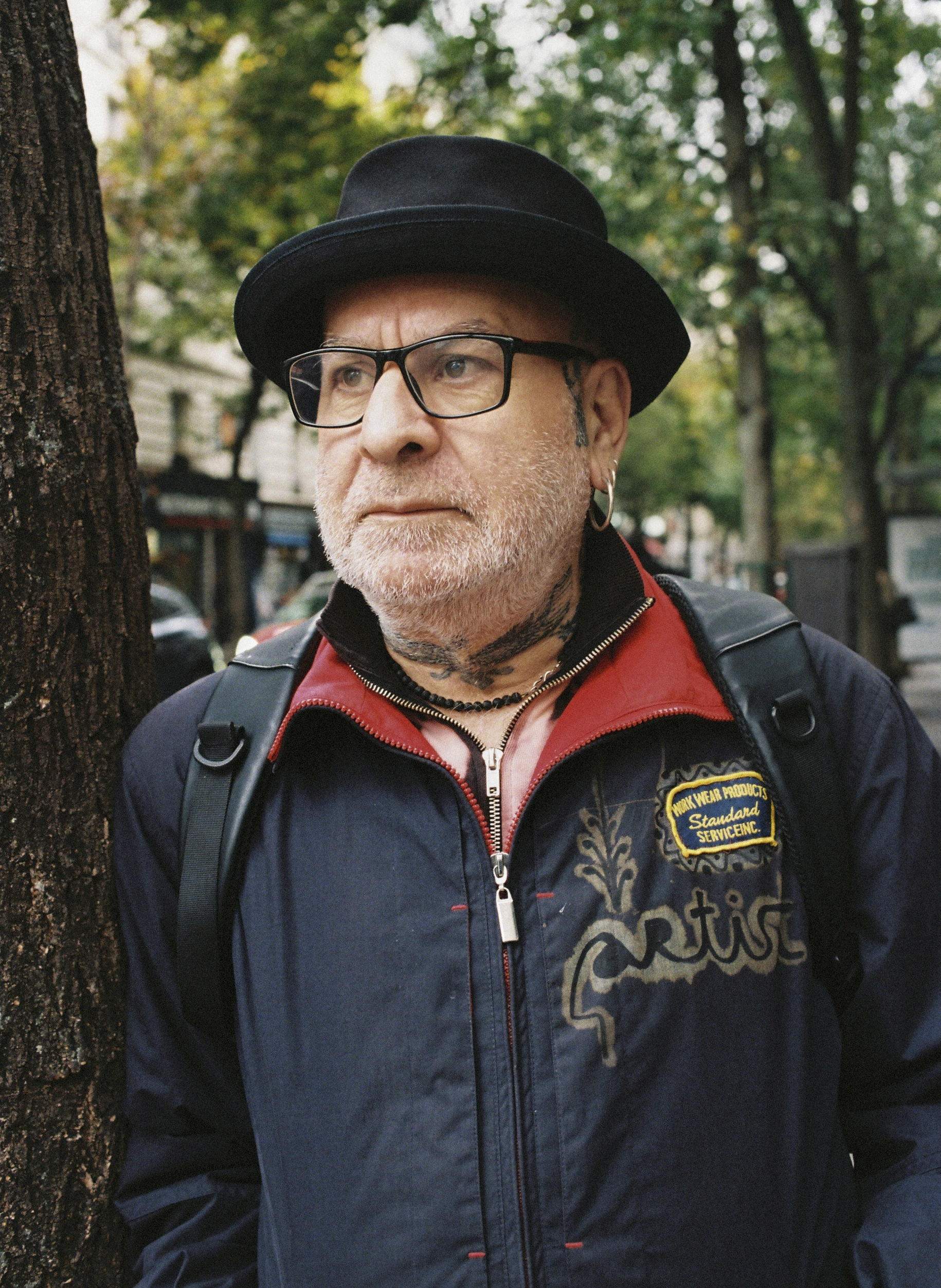
- Babi Badalov in 2025
- Born: June 18, 1959; Lerik, Azerbaijan SSR
- Known for: Visual art, poetry
- Website: https://babibadalov.org/

Babi Badalov (Azerbaijani: Babi Bədəlov; born 18 June 1959) is an Azerbaijani visual artist. Since 2011 he lives and works in Paris, France.

== Life and work ==
Babi Badalov was born as Babakhan Badalov in Lerik, a small town near the Iranian border in the Talysh region of Azerbaijan, to an Azeri father and a Talysh mother. After serving two years in the Soviet Army, he moved to Leningrad (now Saint Petersburg) in 1980, where he quickly became a leading underground artist and a member of the unofficial artists group the Association of Experimental Visual Arts (TEII). Badalov participated in numerous art shows with the group in Russia and abroad. In the late 1980s, he met artists Vadim Ovchinnikov and Timur Novikov, members of the New Artists Group, and became involved in various of their projects and art campaigns.

Badalov has created art objects, paintings, installations and live performances. He also worked on the movie set of avant-garde Russian film director Evgeniy Kondratiev. In addition to his visual explorations, Badalov experiments with words and writes obscure poetry, mixing the languages and mentalities of different cultures. Even though Russian is not his first language, he won the Pushkinskaya 10 poetry contest.

Badalov created a series of ecological art objects called Dolls for Adults, where he isolated the plastic of nature inside his own clothes. He also worked on visual projects dedicated to linguistic explorations, questioning how a person can become the victim of a language barrier, trying to untangle the confusion of the Cyrillic/Latin mix.

In 2010, he took part in Manifesta 8 in Cartagena, Region of Murcia, Spain, The Watchmen, the Liars, the Dreamers at Le Plateau – Frac Ile-de-France, Paris and Lonely at the Top (LATT): Europe at Large #5 (2010), with Vyacheslav Akhunov and Azat Sargsyan at M HKA, Antwerp.

In 2011, Badalov was granted asylum in France due to threats of an honor killing in Azerbaijan because of his homosexuality.

In 2019, his work was shown in the group exhibition Hotel Europa: Their Past, Your Present, Our Future at Open Space of Experimental Art, Tbilisi, and in the two solo exhibitions Soul Mobilisation at La Verrière - Fondation d'entreprise Hermès, Brussels and Het is of de stenen spreken (silence is a commons) at Casco Art Institute, Utrecht.

== Publications ==
- 1990: Jule Reuter, GegenKunst in Leningrad, München, ISBN 978-3781402997
- 1993: Jean-Pierre Brossard; Boris Smelov; Manoir de la ville de Martigny.; et al., Saint-Petersbourg Alter, ISBN 978-2882510525
- 2011: Bart De Baere, Europe at large: art from the former USSR, ISBN 978-9081666503
- 2012: Babi Badalov, Nuage, ISBN 978-8087259184
- 2013: The Collection as a Character, The M HKA Collection, ISBN 978-9-07282-847-7
- 2014: Catalog Tranzit Exhibition, Jan 22-Apr 13, New Museum
