= Furbo, Smedjebacken =

Village in Dalarna, Sweden

Coordinates: 60.17548°N 15.42834°E

Furbo is a village and area near Smedjebacken in Dalarna, Sweden, including Furbo Lake. The village is surrounded by Scots pine forests. The village dates to the Iron Age. Hunting, gathering and fishing are very popular. The economy revolves around forestry.
