= Mia Brunell =

Swedish businesswoman

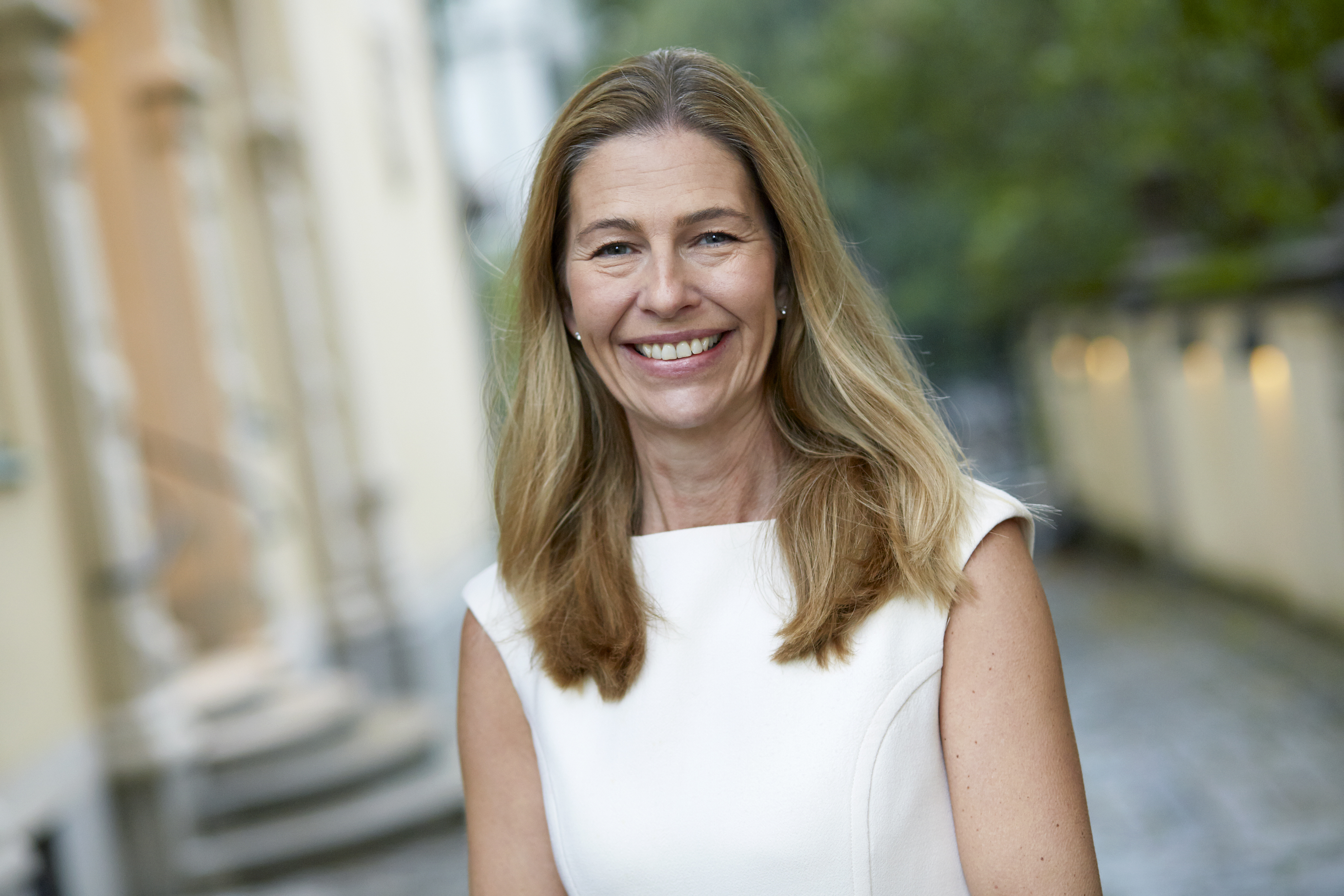
- Brunell in 2014
- Born: Maria Christina Brunell; 30 November 1965 (age 60); Smedjebacken, Sweden
- Education: Stockholm University
- Occupation: Businesswoman
- Spouse: Jan Livfors

Maria Christina "Mia" Brunell Livfors (born 1965) is a Swedish businesswoman. In June 2015 she became CEO of Axel Johnson AB, a family-owned group of companies.

She was CEO of publicly listed Investment AB Kinnevik from 2006 and 2014. Prior to that she was CFO of Modern Times Group AB (MTG) between 2001 and 2006, and before that she worked in Kinnevik and MTG since 1992.

Brunell Livfors studied business administration at Stockholm University between 1985 and 1989.
