= David Benkof =

American journalist

- דייויד בן־כף
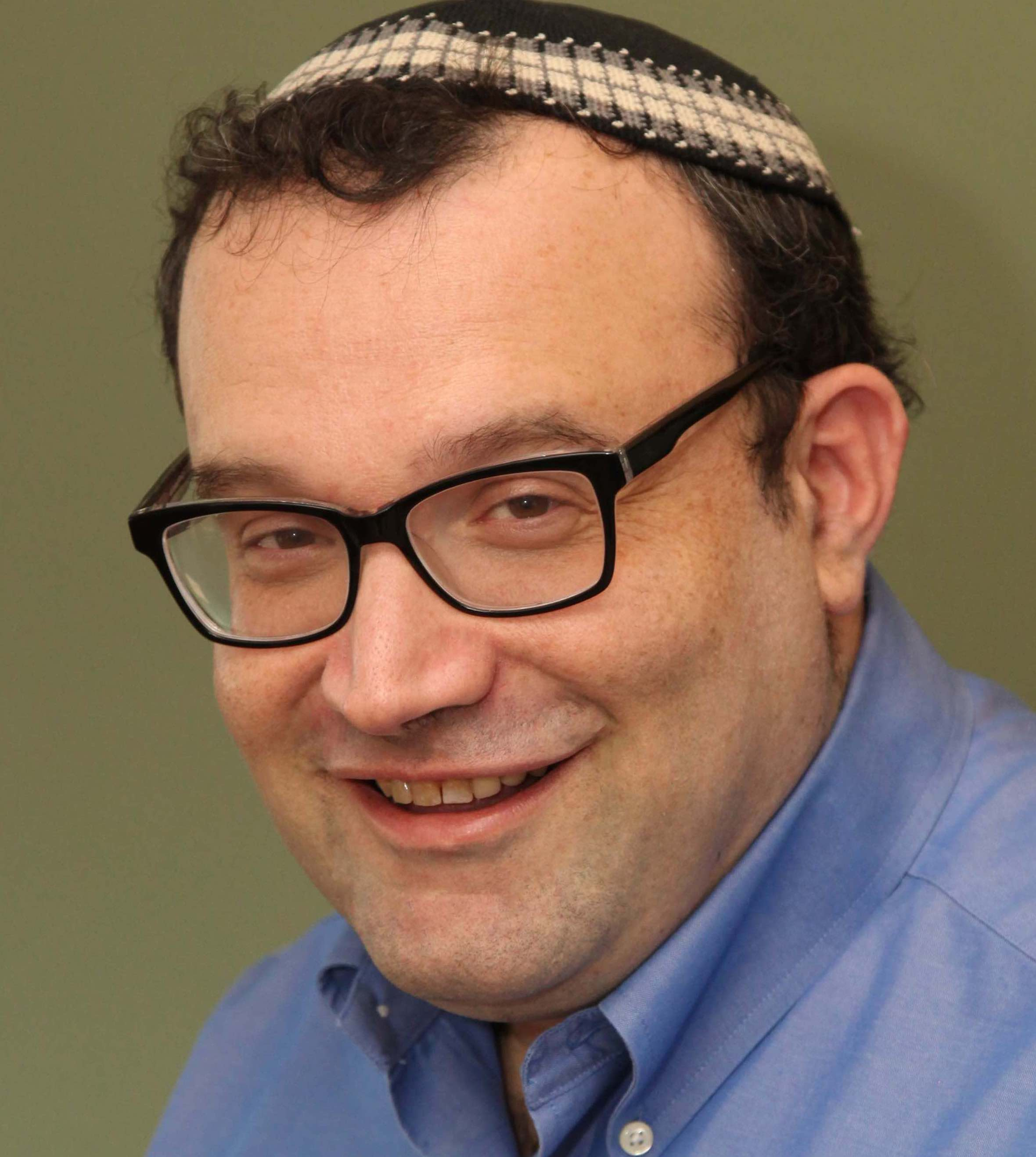
- Born: David Ari Bianco; October 9, 1970 (age 56); St. Louis, Missouri
- Education: Stanford University
- Occupation: Journalist

David Benkof (Hebrew: דייויד בן־כף born David Ari Bianco on October 9, 1970) is an American journalist and commentator who lives in Jerusalem. He was raised in St. Louis, Missouri and then went to college at Stanford University. In 1989 he served as the international president of United Synagogue Youth.

As a writer, his work has appeared in outlets such as The Times of Israel, The Jerusalem Post, The Daily Caller, the Jewish Journal (Los Angeles), and other regional publications. He also writes the MARQUEE: The Broadway Maven’s Weekly Blast Substack newsletter and produces related content on YouTube and his site TheBroadwayMaven.com.

== Early life and education ==
Benkof was born in St. Louis, Missouri, and attended Stanford University. While at Stanford, he became involved in youth leadership as international president of United Synagogue Youth.

Benkof spent the 2004-2005 year at Darche Noam/Shapell's, an Orthodox yeshiva in Jerusalem. He then studied at the Hebrew University in Jerusalem during the 2005-2006 academic year. From 2006 to 2008, he pursued graduate work in American Jewish history at New York University. In 2008 and 2009 he wrote a weekly column, Fabulously Observant, for The Jerusalem Post and several other Jewish newspapers, discussing "life from the perspective of an Orthodox, conservative, American Jew in the process of making aliyah". He returned to Darche Noam/Shapell's from 2011 to 2014 as a teacher of Hebrew grammar.

== Career ==
In 1995, Benkof founded Q Syndicate, a press syndication service that provides columns, cartoons, crossword puzzles and horoscopes. In 1999 he founded Press Pass Q. In 2001, he sold a majority interest in Q Syndicate to Rivendell Marketing, and served as vice president for two years before selling the rest of the company. In 1997 Benkof wrote Modern Jewish History for Everyone and in 1999 Gay Essentials: Facts for Your Queer Brain. In 2002 and 2003 he wrote the column "Over the Rainbow" for Q Syndicate. He also contributed to the Jewish Journal of Los Angeles.

=== Broadway and Cultural Education ===
In recent years Benkof has carved out a niche as a Broadway appreciation educator. Based in Jerusalem, he teaches online classes focused on musical theatre history, thematic analysis, and cultural context. These classes, offered through his Broadway Maven community, attract global participants and cover shows ranging from classics to modern musicals.

He has delivered public lectures interpreting Broadway through cultural lenses, including discussions on Jewish themes in musical theatre arguing that the art form reflects historical experiences of identity, assimilation, and narrative form characteristic of Jewish culture.

He is also known online as The Broadway Maven, hosts educational discussions and interviews focused on musical theatre, providing analysis of productions, creative figures and broader theatrical themes. He has been teaching online courses in Broadway appreciation and Jewish Culture 101 for more than six years, including in-depth studies of individual shows as well as thematic explorations of Broadway history and culture.

Benkof also presents free online seminars and publishes a weekly Substack newsletter, MARQUEE: The Broadway Maven’s Weekly Blast, which focuses on Broadway and musical theatre. In addition, he operates a YouTube channel dedicated to Broadway appreciation and commentary.

He has presented sessions at Limmud festivals in multiple countries, where his teaching has focused on the intersections of Jewish culture and musical theatre, including topics such as the influence of Jewish lyricists on Broadway and the presence of Jewish values and cultural themes in theatre.

== See also ==
- Homosexuality and Judaism
