= Paul Barnes (pastor) =

American minister

Paul Barnes is the founder and former senior minister of the evangelical church Grace Chapel in Douglas County, Colorado. He confessed to being homosexual to the church board, and his resignation was accepted on December 7, 2006. He started the church in his basement and watched it reach a membership of 2,100 in his 28 years of leadership.

An anonymous caller to Grace Chapel expressed concern over having heard someone mention "blowing the whistle" on pastors like Barnes. Barnes confessed when he was confronted and apologized by video to Grace Chapel's Sunday congregation, saying, "I have struggled with homosexuality since I was a 5-year-old boy. . . . I can't tell you the number of nights I have cried myself to sleep, begging God to take this away."
