= Miriam Beizana Vigo =

Spanish writer and literary critic

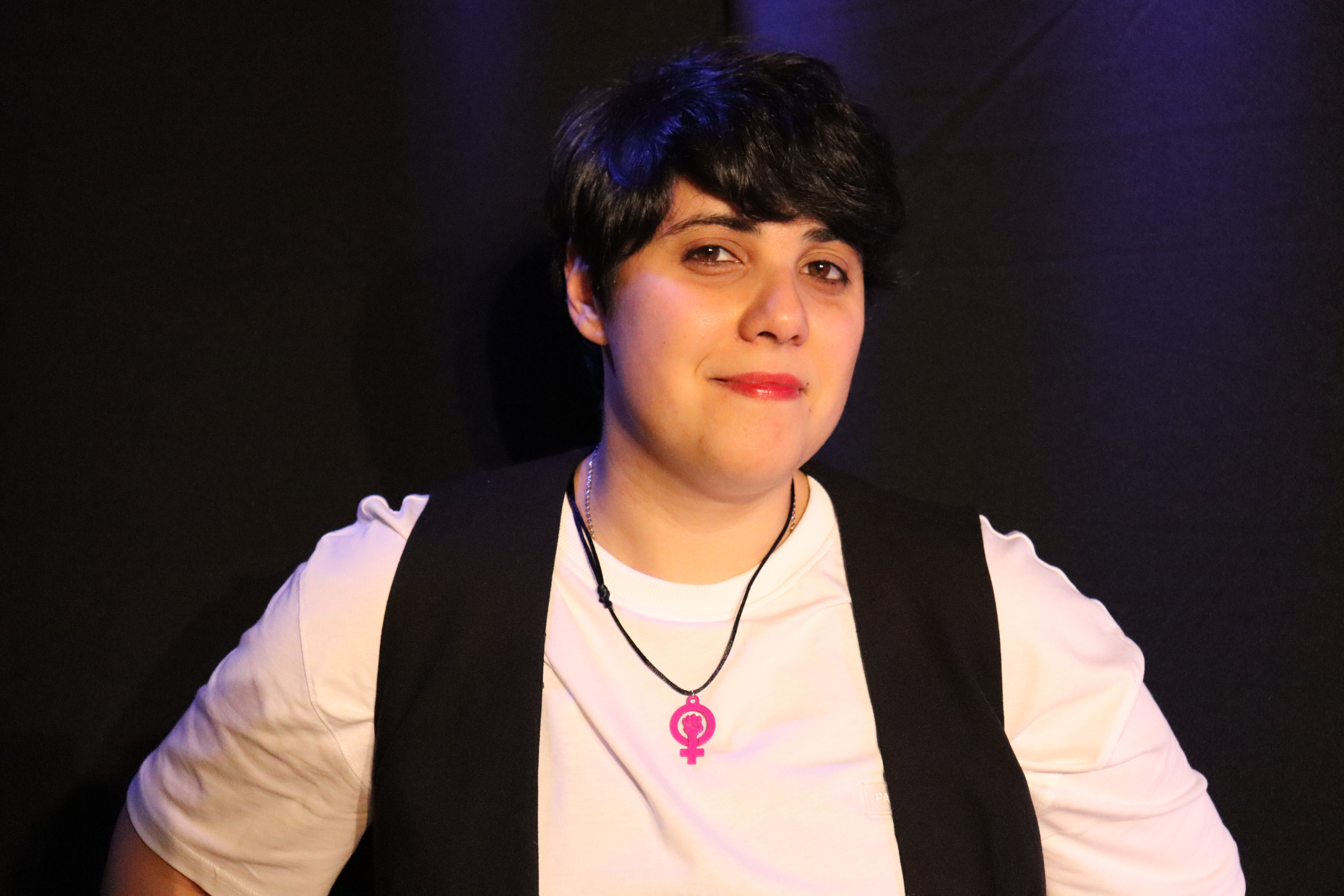
- Born: Miriam Beizana Vigo; 20 August 1990 (age 36); A Coruña
- Occupations: Writer and literary critic
- Website: https://miriambeizana.com

Miriam Beizana Vigo (born 20 August 1990) is a Spanish writer and literary critic.

She was born in A Coruña and works in administration in the industrial sector, and has been writing since she was very young. Her first novel, Marafariña., partly autobiographical, tells the love story of Ruth, a young Jehovah's Witness, and Olga, a Catalan girl who arrives newly to the village where Ruth resides; the sequel, Inflorescence, was published three years later. Todas las horas mueren (literally, All the hours die), is a short fiction novel based on a story begun by her mother. She has also written an essay about the pop singer Tino Casal.

Although her work often gives prominence to women (usually lesbians), she rejects the label of lesbian novels since her books are not exclusive to LGTBI people. In the words of the author:

I think that no author or author writes LGBT novel itself. They write romance novel, fantasy novel, intimate novel, science fiction novel whose plot reflects a homosexual character. I do not know what kind of world we live in that makes this type of books have a distinctive, as if they could only focus on a general public. What anger. As if it were a problem, a barrier, a badge. How squeaky. Because I read more of a heterosexual novel than a lesbian novel, but it seems that the heterosexual world can not assume reading a lesbian novel.

Among her influences are Fannie Flagg, Virginia Woolf, Carmen Laforet, Rosa Montero and Ana María Matute.

She collaborates in literary criticism on A Librería website, and writes articles on the LGTB visibility and dissemination portal Hay una lesbiana en mi sopa (literally, There is a lesbian in my soup).

== Awards and honours ==
- 2nd Prize in the XI Intercultural Story Contest of Melilla (for the story El tren, literally, The train)
- Finalist I Award Misteria 2018 by Les Editorial (for the story A Raíña, literally, The queen)

== Works ==
=== Novels ===
- Beizana Vigo, Miriam (27 May 2015). Marafariña (in Spanish). Lektu (published 1 June 2015). ISBN 978-1512227253..
- Beizana Vigo, Miriam (31 August 2016). Todas las horas mueren [All the hours die] (in Spanish). CreateSpace Independent Publishing Platform (published 1 July 2016). ISBN 978-1536838824.
- Beizana Vigo, Miriam (25 May 2018). Inflorescencia [Inflorescence] (in Spanish). CreateSpace Independent Publishing Platform (published 2 July 2018). ISBN 978-1720316213.

=== Essays ===
- Navarro Asensio, Pep; Beizana Vigo, Miriam (26 April 2016). Tino Casal. Tal como fue [Tino Casal. As he was] (in Spanish). self-made. ISBN 978-1530801527.

=== Stories ===
- Beizana Vigo, Miriam; Catalá, Marta; Col, Valerie; Dutie, Thais; Egea, Vanessa; Asunción García, Clara; Grey, Eley; Hav, Erika; Irún, A.M.; Martínez, Mila; Mars, Emma (3 December 2016). HULEMS (ed.). Cada día me gustas más (Relato: Ensayo sobre la fragilidad del amor) [Every day I like you more (Story: Essay on the fragility of love)] (in Spanish). Createspace Independent Pub. ISBN 978-1540804501.
- Abril, Adrián; Almarza González, Rubén; Arana Ontiveros, Alexandro; Arias de la Cruz, Sonia; Arrabal Carrión, David; Arranz, Milagros; Arrieta, Sergio; Beizana Vigo, Miriam; Cañas Ovejero, Angelina; Casamayor Pindado, Daniel; Chinchilla Rodríguez, Avelina; Dufour García, Ignacio J.; García Valles, Clara; Hav, Erika; Hernández García, Miguel; Hernández de Molina, Antonio Jesús; Herráiz Yébenes, Carmen; de Hueso, Inés; Lago, Helena y Candas, Inés; Landa Santiago, Amelia Ester; Lara Navarro, Ángel; Josman, Maese; Martínez Cebrián, Mónica; de Mena, Rosa; Molina Rodríguez, Josefa; Muelas Colmena, Pedro; Nieto-Márquez Venero, Antonio; Oteo Iglesias, Teresa; Pelayo Rapado, Concha; Puig Linares, Alejandro; del Río, Pilar; Roldán, Ángel; Rodríguez Patiño, Ana Belén; Sánchez Aznar, Eduardo; Sánchez Moreno, Juan Manuel; Santos Rodríguez, David; Torres Estrada, José; Vigo, Ana (2016). Playa de Ákaba (ed.). Personajes de novela (Relato: El peso de las lágrimas en el corazón) [Novel characters (Story: The weight of tears in the heart)] (in Spanish). Createspace Independent Pub. ISBN 978-8494625428.
- Beizana Vigo, Miriam (4 April 2018). El tren [The train] (in Spanish). Lektu.
- Beizana Vigo, Miriam (12 October 2018). "Mangas Verdes" [Green sleeves]. Editorial Cerbero (in Spanish). A Coruña.
- Beizana Vigo, Miriam (15 January 2019). "El tiempo de las cerezas" [Time of cherries]. Libros Prohibidos (in Spanish). A Coruña (published January 2019).
- Beizana Vigo, Miriam; Buedo, Virginia; Diosdado, Nahikari; Dopazo Lafuente, Daniel; Gonzálvez del Águila, Raúl; Guez, Víctor; Henríquez Hernández, Luis Alberto; Moledo, Manuel; Monsalve García, Alejandro; Pagés, Santi; Pérez Gil, Alicia; Puelles, Bruno; Reuven, Caryanna; Rochet Monteagudo, Arantxa; Roux, Ana; Maquillón, Laura S.; Santiago, Juanma; Teso Fuentes, Juan Carlos; Tordera, María; Vaquerizo, Eduardo; Velilla Alonso, Yaiza (2019). Actos de F.E. (Story: Dor) [Acts of F.A.I.T.H. (Story: Pain)] (in Spanish). Cerbero (published January 2019). ISBN 978-84949845-5-6.
- Arbeteta, Raquel; Beizana Vigo, Miriam; García Ramos, Adriana; Gispert, Teresa; Gonzálvez San Martín, Evelyn; Hernández Alonso, Viviana; M. Vila, Alba; M. Zubieta, Haizea; Morán Infiesta, Ana; Romero Bonilla, Elena; Tena Tena, Marina; Delfina Húngaro, María (2019). Misteria I (Story: A Raíña) [Mystery I (Story: The Queen)] (in Spanish). LES (published March 2019). ISBN 978-84-949350-7-7.
