= Viggo =

Viggo, also spelled Wiggo, is a Nordic male name. There are two main theories about its origins:

- a Latinised form of the Old Norse name Viggeir, which is also found in the form of other Germanic names, such as Ludvig. It stems from old Norse vig-, meaning "battle, fight".
- a variant of the Icelandic name Vöggur, coming from old Norse 'vöggr', "one who lies in a cradle".

People named Viggo include:

- Viggo Bielefeldt (1851–1909), Danish composer
- Viggo Brøndal (1887–1942), Danish philologist, professor of Romance languages and literature
- Viggo Brodersen (1879–1965), Danish composer and pianist
- Viggo Brun (1885–1978), Norwegian mathematician
- Viggo Christensen(1880–1967), the first Lord Mayor of Copenhagen
- Viggo Dibbern (1900–1981), Danish gymnast and Olympic medalist
- Viggo Fausböll (1821–1908), Danish translator and Indologist
- Viggo Hagstrøm (1954–2013), Norwegian legal scholar and educator
- Viggo Hansteen (1900–1941), Norwegian politician and member of the resistance
- Viggo Hørup (1841–1902), Danish politician, journalist and agitator
- Viggo Jensen (1874–1930), Danish weightlifter, shooter, gymnast and Olympic medalist
- Viggo Jensen (1921–2005), Danish footballer
- Viggo Jensen (born 1947), Danish footballer
- Viggo Johansen (1851–1935), Danish painter
- Viggo Johansen (born 1949), Norwegian journalist and television presenter
- Viggo Johannessen (1936–2012), Norwegian statistician and civil servant
- Viggo Kampmann (1910–1976), Prime Minister of Denmark
- Viggo Larsen (1880–1957), Danish film actor, director and producer
- Viggo Lindstrøm (1858–1926), Danish actor and theatre director
- Viggo Madsen (1943–2025), Danish poet and writer
- Viggo Mortensen (born 1958), Danish-American actor
- Viggo Rivad (1922–2016), Danish photographer
- Viggo Rørup (1903–1971), Danish painter
- Viggo Stilling-Andersen (1893–1967), Danish fencer
- Viggo Stoltenberg-Hansen (born 1942), Swedish mathematician and logician
- Viggo Stuckenberg (1863–1905), Danish poet
- Viggo Sundmoen (born 1954), Norwegian footballer
- Viggo Ullmann (1848–1910), Norwegian educator and politician
- Viggo Venn (born 1989), Norwegian comedian
- Viggo Widerøe (1904–2002), Norwegian aviator and entrepreneur
- Viggo Wiehe (1874–1956), Danish actor

== See also ==
- Vigo (name)
