= Walter Kraft =

German organist, composer and educator (1905–1977)

- Born: 9 June 1905; Cologne, North Rhine-Westphalia, Germany
- Died: 9 May 1977 (aged 71); Amsterdam, Netherlands
- Occupations: Organist; composer; music educator
- Years active: 1924–1972
- Employers: Markuskirche (Hamburg); Lutherkirche (Altona); St. Mary's Church, Lübeck; Hochschule für Musik Freiburg; Schleswig-Holstein Academy of Music; North German Organ College
- Organization: Lübeck Church Orchestra
- Notable work: Abendmusik
- Style: Classical
- Musical career
- Label: Vox

Walter Kraft (9 June 1905, Cologne – 9 May 1977, Amsterdam) was a German organist and composer, best known for his remarkably long tenure (1929–72) at St. Mary's Church, Lübeck.

== Biography ==
Kraft studied piano and organ in Hamburg with Hanneman, and studied composition in Berlin with Paul Hindemith. After his studies, his first professional organist position was at Hamburg's Markuskirche in 1924, followed by Altona's Lutherkirche in 1927.

In 1929, Kraft was unanimously selected (from among 45 applicants) for a life appointment as organist in St. Mary's Church, Lübeck (Marienkirche, Lübeck). He held this position until his retirement in 1972. During this tenure, he revived the practice of evening concerts of sacred works. Such concerts, collectively called Abendmusik, had been regularly given by his predecessors at the church, notably Dieterich Buxtehude and Franz Tunder, though they had ceased in 1810, mainly due to the dislocation caused to northern Germany by the Napoleonic Wars. Kraft pursued historically accurate performance practices. In 1934, he founded a boys' choir to perform Bach's Passions. In 1939, he formed the Lübeck Church Orchestra for the Cultivation of Original Instruments.

From 1947 to 1950, Kraft taught organ music at the Hochschule für Musik Freiburg. From 1950 to 1955, he directed the Schleswig-Holstein Academy of Music and the North German Organ College.

Kraft made numerous commercial recordings (primarily for the Vox label) during the LP era, most of which have been reissued on compact disc and as MP3s. As well as recording Handel's 12 organ concertos, he was among the first to commit to disc the entire solo organ music (or what was believed to be at the time) of Bach and Buxtehude. His discography also included pieces by more obscure German Baroque musicians such as Nicolaus Bruhns.

Like his younger contemporary Anton Heiller, Kraft also composed a fair amount (mostly organ music but also an oratorio called Christus), though as with Heiller, his fame as a performer completely upstaged his hopes of lasting renown as a creator. Once he retired in 1972 from the Marienkirche post, he apparently planned to write an opera, but never finished any such work.

He married violinist Eva-Marie Kraft. Kraft died along with 32 others in the Hotel Polen fire in Amsterdam.

== Selected Compositions ==
=== For Organ ===
- Te deum for 2 organs (1943) [manuscript only]
- Partita on Nun will sich scheiden Nacht und Tag [Baerenreiter, 1949]. Based on the song by Heinrich Schütz.
- Toccata on 'Ite missa est' [Schott, 1970]
- Prelude in G [Eulenburg, 1970]
- Fantasia on Three Easter Songs [Amadeus, 1974]
- Triptychon on 'St. Michael' [Schott, 1975]
- Fantasie 'Media vita in morte sumus' [Amadeus]
- Five Short Organ Pieces [Amadeus]
- Fantasy Dies Irae
- Fantasy on Mitten wir im Leben Sind. Based on Martin Luther's 1524 song (which itself is based on the Gregorian chant Media vita in morte).

=== Organ with instruments ===
- Ostsee-Kantate (Baltic Cantata, 1931). Kraft's first major commission, for 1931's "Nordische Orgelwerke", based on writings of Hans Henny Jahnn and the national anthems of seven Baltic countries.
- Lübecker Totentanz [1954] for soloists, choir, organ, and instruments. Inspired by the Marienkirche's Totentanz painting destroyed during WWII. Premiered in 1954 in St. Catherine's Church. The organ solo Toccata has been recorded.
- Prelude, Pastorale & Chaconne, flute & organ [Amadeus, 1947]
- Concerto for organ & chamber orchestra (1963) [manuscript only]
- Metaphern (Metaphors), violin & organ [Hanssler, 1979]. Pieces arranged according to the description of Jerusalem's precious gems as found in Revelations. Dedicated to and premiered by his wife Eva-Maria Kraft.

=== Other ===
- Christus [1944], 7-part a capella work. Its 1944 premiere was banned by the Gestapo, later premiered in October 1945.
- Die Gemeinschaft der Heiligen for soli, choirs, wind instruments, bells, parish and organ. Written for the 250-year celebration of Buxtehude's death, and with the Marienkirche's acoustics specifically in mind.
