= Schieferdecker =

Schieferdecker may refer to:

- 7881 Schieferdecker, a main-belt asteroid
- Bettina Schieferdecker (born 1968), German gymnast
- Johann Christian Schieferdecker (1679–1732), German Baroque composer
