= Paul Behrens =

Paul Behrens may refer to:

- Paul Behrens (clockmaker)
- Paul Behrens (scientist)
