= Johann Wilhelm Cornelius von Königslöw =

German composer (1745–1833)

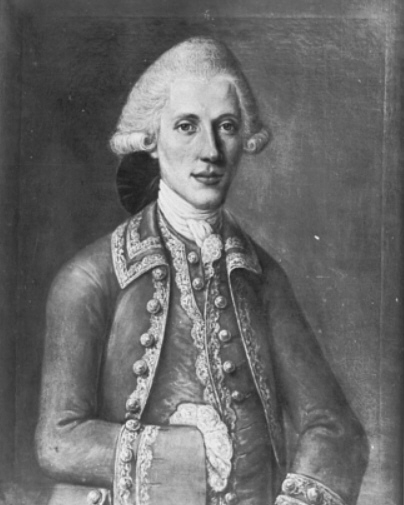
Johann Wilhelm Cornelius von Königslöw, before the 19th century

Johann Wilhelm Cornelius von Königslöw (16 March 1745 – 14 May 1833) was a German composer and musician active at the St. Mary's Church, Lübeck.

== Life ==
Born in Hamburg, he studied piano and singing with his father. At 13 years old, the boy became a soprano in the Lübeck Marienkirche under Adolph Kunzen, who taught him composition, organ, and violin. He also learned the cello. Königslöw became his assistant in 1772, taking over the direction of the Abendmusiken in 1773, and succeeding Kunzen in 1781. From 1773 he was organist at the church. In 1776, he married Margarete Catharina Friedlein.

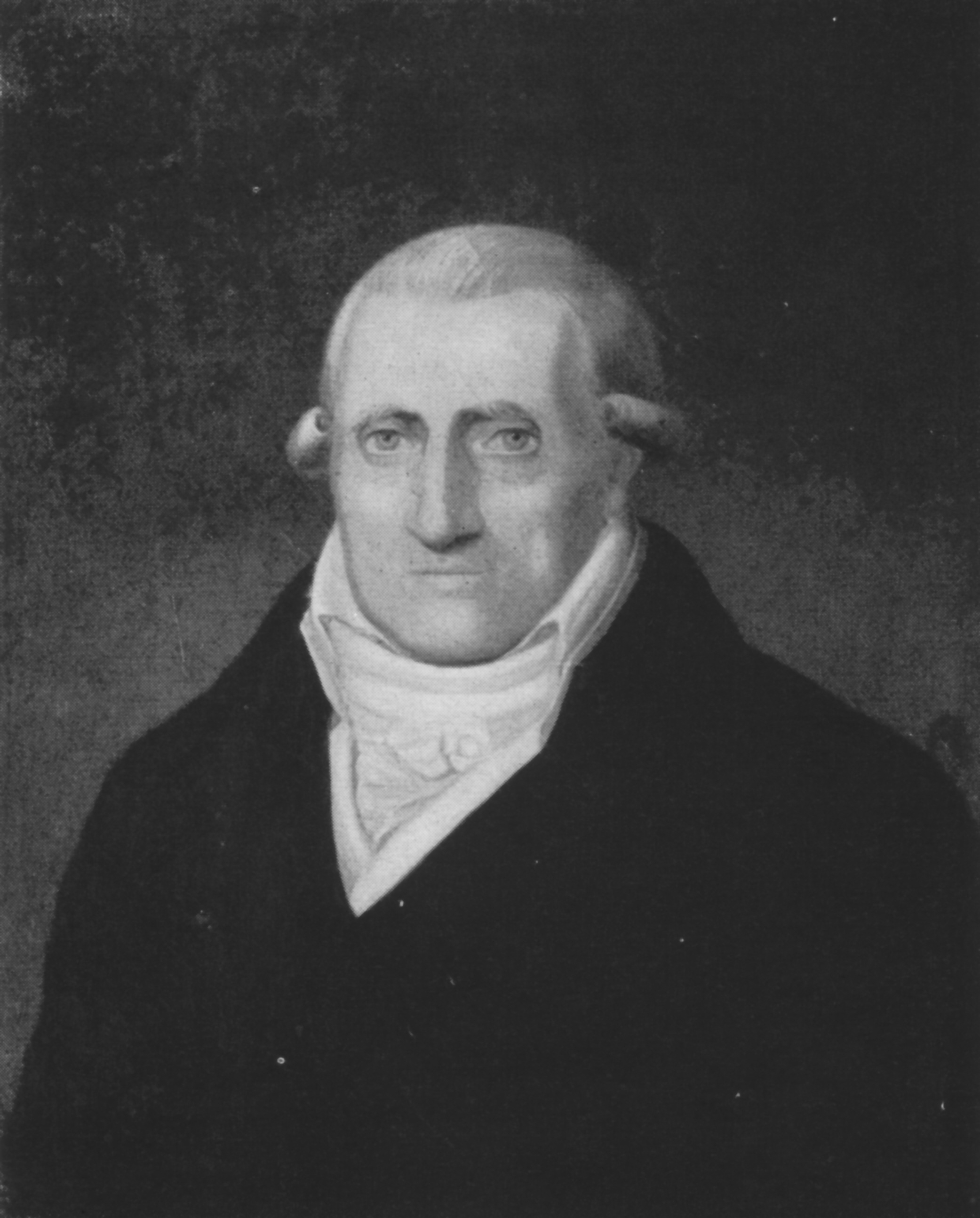
Johann Wilhelm Cornelius von Königslöw, 1826

Königslöw was a leading figure in Lübeck's musical activities. He conducted Good Friday concerts, annual evening concerts, promoted amateur concerts, and founded a choral society. Beginning in the late 1790s, he collaborated with violinist Antoine Lacroix on a series of private concerts. In 1810, he discontinued the evening concerts due to financial problems, and later in 1823 also stopped conducting the amateur concerts. Königslöw continued conducting the Good Friday until 1832. He died in 1833 in Lübeck.

== Music ==
The composer wrote several oratorios for the Abendmusiken (most of which are lost), cantatas, orchestra works, and keyboard music. His music show the influence of Carl Philipp Emanuel Bach, Joseph Haydn and Wolfgang Amadeus Mozart. Most of Königslöw's compositions were composed for the Abendmusiken. They are mostly within the Classical style, except for various stylistic choices. His fugues for organ are examples of the transition towards the Classical style in organ music.

== Works ==
Data from Die Musik in Geschichte und Gegenwart.

=== Oratorios ===
- Des jungen Tobias Verheirathung (1781)
- Die Zuhausekunft des jungen Tobias (1782)
- Saras Ankunft bey Tobias (1783)
- Joseph (1784)
- Davids Thronbesteigung (1785)
- Joajada, der Hohepriester (1786)
- Esther (1787)
- Die Rettung des Kindes Mose (1788), in three parts
- Der geborene Weltheiland (1788), in two parts
- Die eheme Schlange (1789), in two parts
- Petrus (1791), in two parts
- Paulus (1792), in two parts, with part one by M. A. Bauck
- Davids Klage am Hermon nach dem 42sten Psalm (1793), in one part
- Davids Sieg über die Philister (1797)
- Saul und David im Kriege (1800)

=== Cantatas ===
- Musik fürs Gymnasium (1799)
- Michaelismusik (1801)
- Michaelismusik (1802), with parts from Die Zuhausekunft des jungen Tobias
- Kirchenmusik am Neujahrstage
- Johannismusik, with parts from Der geborene Weltheiland
- Lobet den Herrn

=== Orchestral works ===
- Harpsichord Concerto (1781)
- Overtures

=== Organ works ===
- Five volumes of 12 fugues each, 12 Fugen für Freunde und Liebhaber des Orgelspiels (volume 1 not extant), including two fugues for two organs
- Book of Organ chorales for the Lübecker
