= St. Mary's Church, Lübeck =

St Mary's Church
- St Mary's Church of Lübeck
- Marienkirche
- St. Marien zu Lübeck
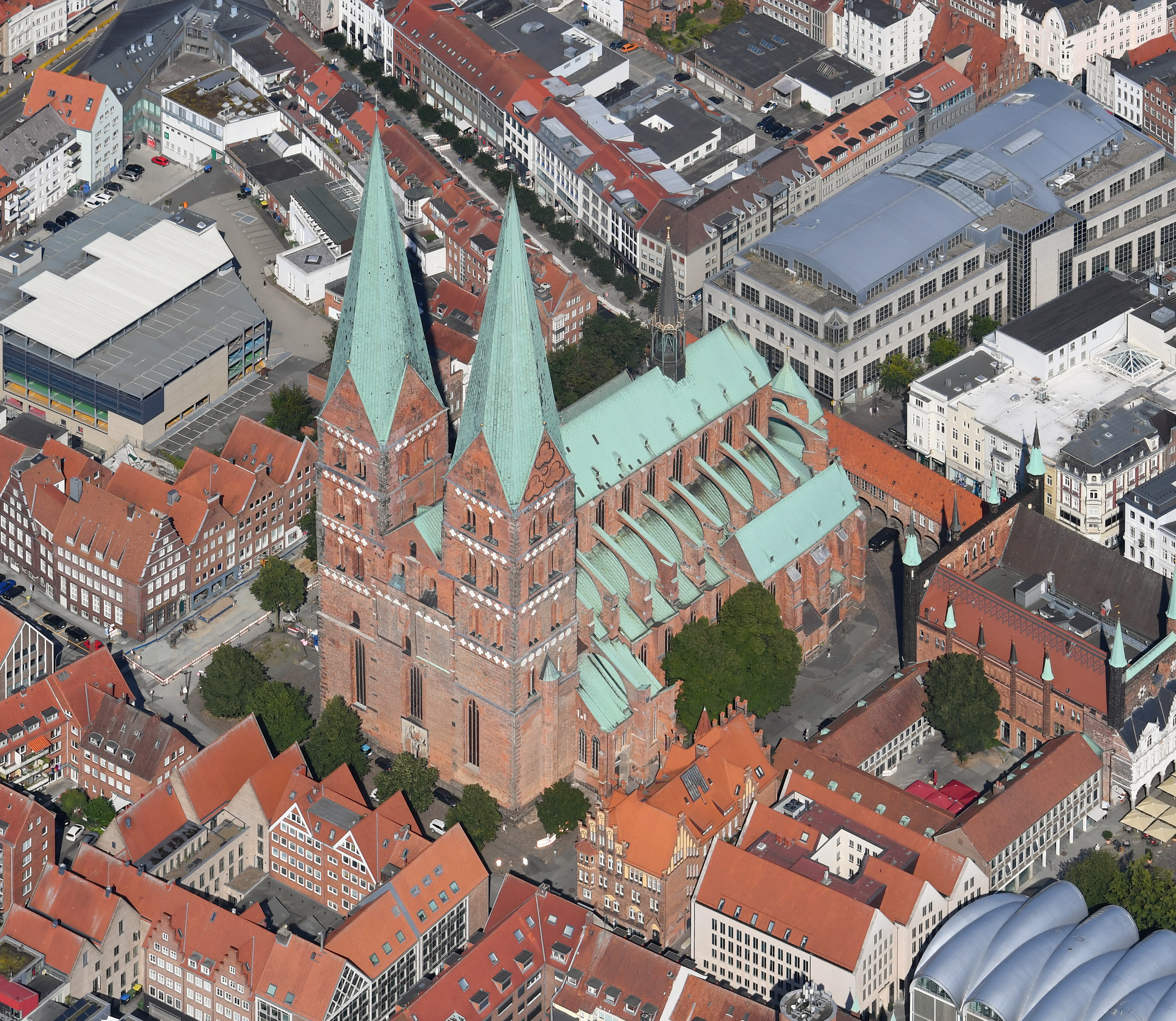
- St Mary's Church, Lübeck, from the south
- St Mary's Church
- 53°52′04″N 10°41′06″E
- Location: Lübeck
- Country: Germany
- Denomination: Lutheran
- Previous denomination: Catholic
- Website: www.st-marien-luebeck.de

History
- Status: Parish church

Architecture
- Functional status: Active
- Heritage designation: Part of UNESCO world heritage site
- Architectural type: Basilica
- Style: Brick Gothic
- Groundbreaking: c. 1250/1265
- Completed: c. 1350

Specifications
- Length: 102 metres (335 ft) (total length) 70 metres (230 ft) (Length of the middle nave)
- Height: 125 metres (410 ft) (tower) 47.5 metres (156 ft) (roof top) 38.5 metres (126 ft) (vault height in the main nave) 20.5 metres (67 ft) (vault height in the side naves)

Clergy
- Pastors: Robert Pfeifer; Annegret Wegner-Braun

The Lübeck Marienkirche (officially St Marien zu Lübeck) is a medieval basilica in the city centre of Lübeck, Germany. Built between 1265 and 1352, the church is located on the highest point of Lübeck's old town island within the Hanseatic merchants' quarter, which extends uphill from the warehouses on the River Trave to the church. As the main parish church of the citizens and the city council of Lübeck, it was built close to the town hall and the market. The church was almost destroyed by Royal Air Force bombs in 1942, and reconstructed between 1947 and 1959.

The church was built as a three-aisled basilica with side chapels, an ambulatory with radiating chapels, and vestibules like the arms of a transept. The westwork has a monumental two-tower façade. The height of the towers, including the weather vanes, is 124.95 metres (409.9 ft) and 124.75 metres (409.3 ft), respectively. It has the tallest brick vault in the world, the height of the central nave being 38.5 metres (126 ft).

St Mary's epitomizes north German Brick Gothic and set the standard for about 70 other churches in the Baltic region, making it a building of enormous architectural significance. It is referred to as the "mother church of brick Gothic" and is considered a major work of church building in the Baltic Sea region. Because of its architectural importance and testimony to the medieval influence of the Hanseatic League (of which Lübeck was the de facto capital), in 1987 St Mary's Church was inscribed on the UNESCO World Heritage List along with the Lübeck City Centre. St Mary's is part of the Evangelical Lutheran Church in Northern Germany.

== History ==
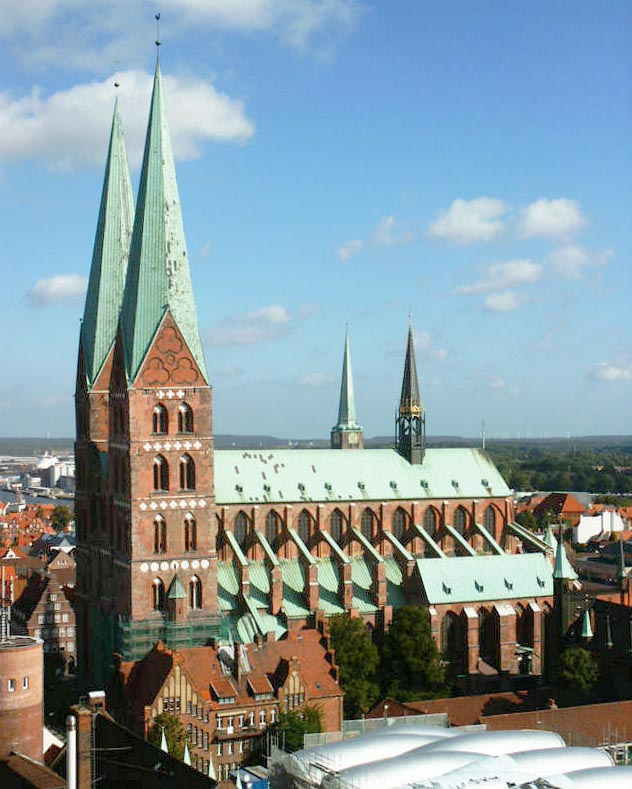
Side view

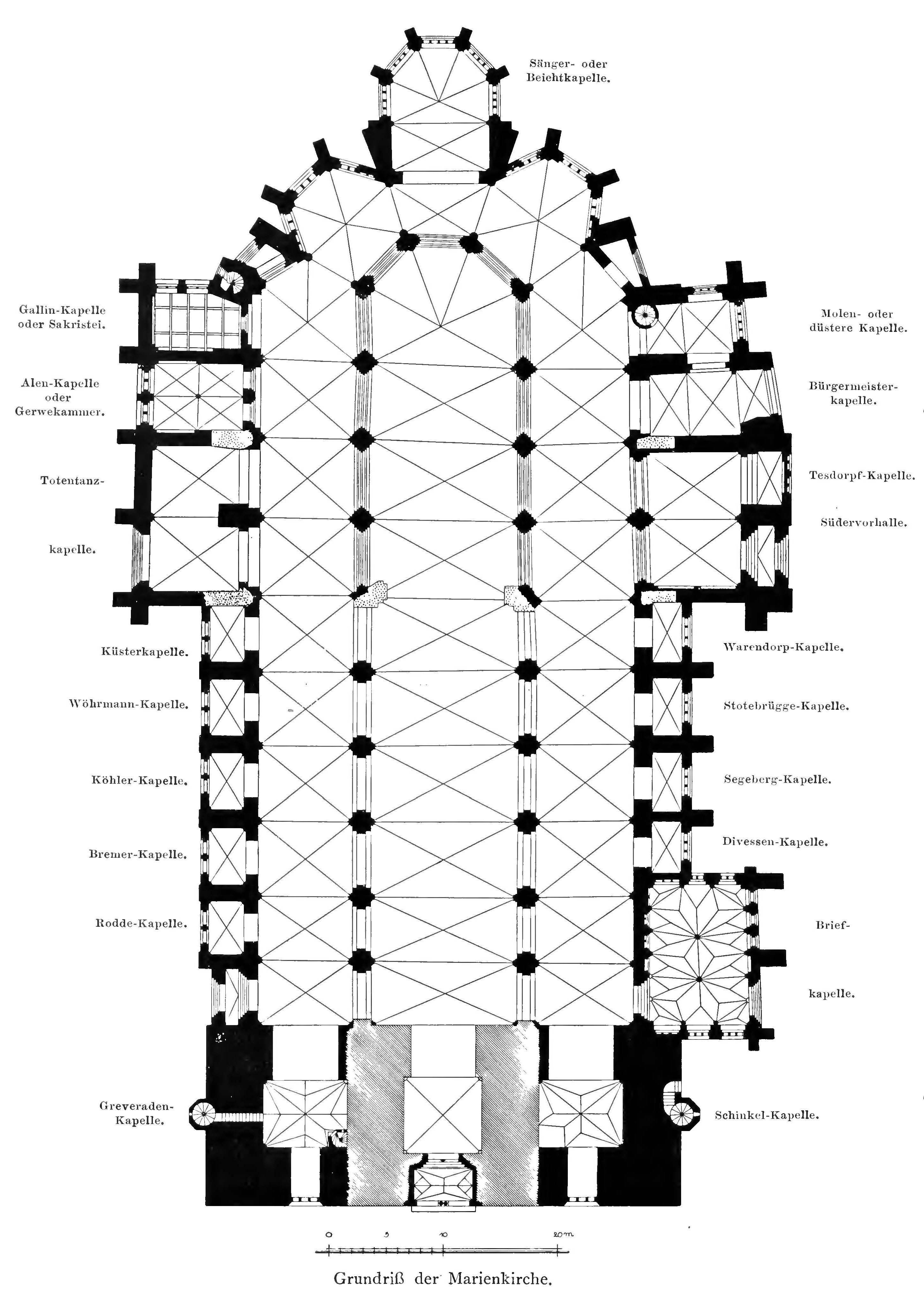
Floor plan (1906)

In 1160, Henry the Lion moved the Bishopric of Oldenburg to Lübeck and established a cathedral chapter in the south of the old city island.

After 1160, a wooden church was built on the site of the Marienkirche in the middle of the town, which was first documented in 1170 together with St. Petri as a market church. Already at the end of the 12th century it was replaced by a Romanesque brick church that existed until the middle of the 13th century. Romanesque sculptures from the furnishings of this second Marienkirche are now on display in the St. Annen Museum. The sixth pair of pillars in the nave (from the west) dating from around 1200 can be seen as a remnant of the Romanesque Marienkirche in today's High Gothic building.

The design of the three-aisled basilica was based on the Gothic cathedrals in France (Reims) and Flanders, which were built of natural stone. St. Mary's is the epitome of ecclesiastical Brick Gothic architecture and set the standard for many churches in the Baltic region, such as the St. Nicholas Church in Stralsund and St. Nicholas in Wismar.

No one had ever before built a brick church this high and with a vaulted ceiling. The lateral thrust exerted by the vault is met by buttresses, making the enormous height possible. The motive for the Lübeck town council to embark on such an ambitious undertaking was the acrimonious relationship with the Bishopric of Lübeck.

The church was built close to the Lübeck Town Hall and the market, and it dwarfed the nearby Romanesque Lübeck Cathedral, the church of the bishop established by Henry the Lion. It was meant as a symbol of the desire for freedom on the part of the Hanseatic traders and the secular authorities of the city, which had been granted the status of a free imperial city (Reichsfreiheit), making the city directly subordinate to the emperor, in 1226. It was also intended to underscore the pre-eminence of the city in relation to the other cities of the Hanseatic League, which was being formed at about the same time (1356).

The Chapel of Indulgences (Briefkapelle) was added to the east of the south tower in 1310. It was both a vestibule and a chapel and, with its portal, was the church's second main entrance from the market. Probably originally dedicated to Saint Anne, the chapel received its current name during the Reformation, when paid scribes moved in. The chapel, which is 12 metres (39 ft) long, 8 metres (26 ft) deep, and 2 metres (7 ft) high, has a stellar vault ceiling and is considered a masterpiece of High Gothic architecture. It has often been compared to English Gothic Cathedral Architecture and the chapter house of Malbork Castle. Today the Chapel of Indulgences serves the community as a church during winter, with services from January to March.

In 1289 the town council built its own chapel, known as the Bürgermeisterkapelle (Burgomasters' Chapel), at the southeast corner of the ambulatory, the join being visible from the outside where there is a change from glazed to unglazed brick. It was in this chapel, from the large pew that still survives, that the newly elected council used to be installed. On the upper floor of the chapel is the treasury, where important documents of the city were kept. This part of the church is still in the possession of the town.

Before 1444, a chapel consisting of a single bay was added to the eastern end of the ambulatory, its five walls forming five-eighths of an octagon. This was the last Gothic extension to the church. It was used for celebrating the so-called Hours of the Virgin, as part of the veneration of the Virgin Mary, reflected in its name Marientidenkapelle (Our Lady's Hours Chapel) or Sängerkapelle (Singers' Chapel).

In total, St Mary's Church has nine larger chapels and ten smaller ones that serve as sepulchral chapels and are named after the families of the Lübeck city council that used them and endowed them.

== Destruction and restoration ==
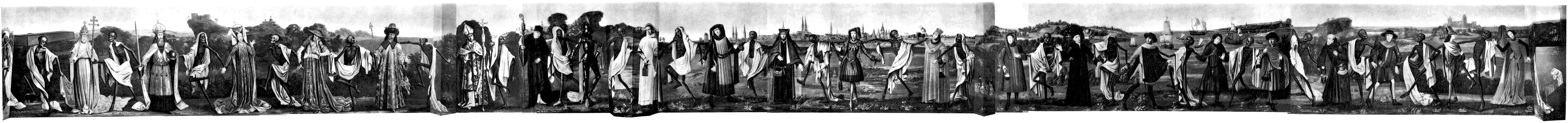
Pre-War photograph of the Danse Macabre

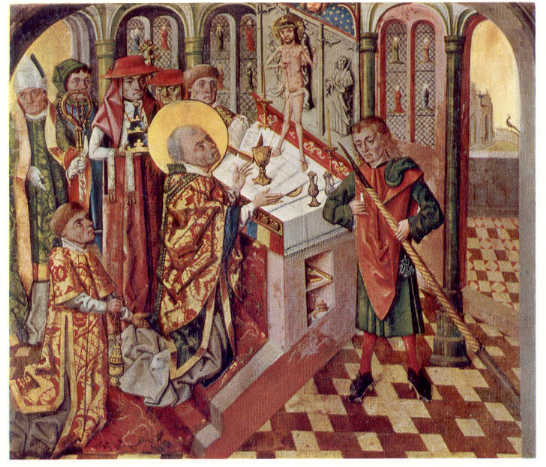
Mass of St Gregory by Bernt Notke

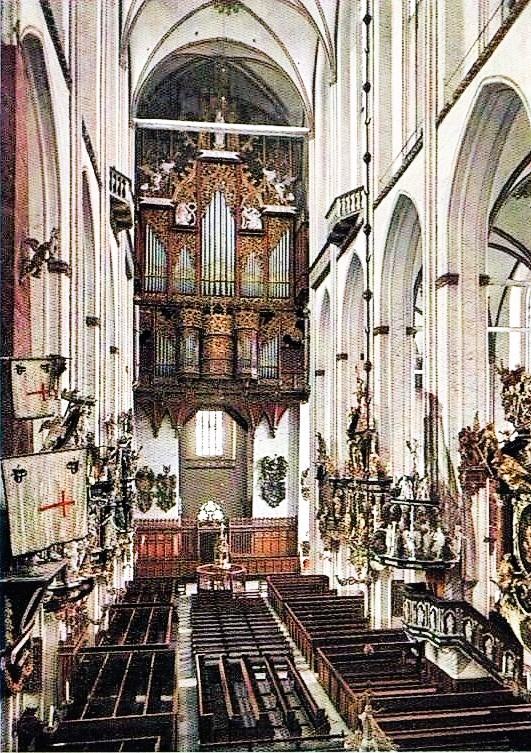
Nave, view to the west, before the destruction

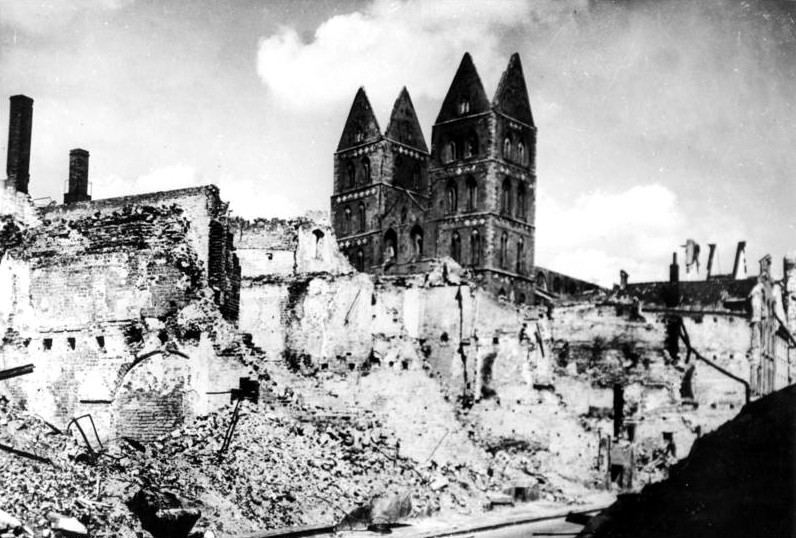
Ruins of the merchants' quarter and St. Mary's church

In an air raid by the RAF on 28–29 March 1942 – the night of Palm Sunday – the church was almost completely destroyed by fire, together with about a fifth of the Lübeck city centre, including Lübeck Cathedral and St. Peter's Church.

Among the artefacts destroyed was the famous Totentanzorgel (Danse Macabre organ), an instrument played by Dieterich Buxtehude and probably Johann Sebastian Bach. Other works of art destroyed in the fire include the Mass of Saint Gregory by Bernt Notke, the monumental Danse Macabre, originally by Bernt Notke but replaced by a copy in 1701, the carved figures of the rood screen, the Trinity altarpiece by Jacob van Utrecht (formerly also attributed to Bernard van Orley) and the Entrance of Christ into Jerusalem by Friedrich Overbeck. Sculptures by the woodcarver Benedikt Dreyer were also lost in the fire: the wooden statues of the saints on the west side of the rood screen and the organ sculpture on the great organ from around 1516–18 and Man with Counting Board.

Also destroyed in the fire were the mediaeval stained glass windows from the St. Mary Magdalene Church, which were installed in St. Mary's Church from 1840 on, after the St. Mary Magdalene Church was demolished because it was in danger of collapse. Photographs by Lübeck photographers like Wilhelm Castelli give an impression of what the interior looked like before the War.

The glass window in one of the chapels has an alphabetic list of major towns in the pre-1945 eastern territory of the German Reich. Because of the destruction it suffered in World War II, St. Mary's Church is one of the Cross of Nails centres. A plaque on the wall warns of the futility of war.

The church was protected by a makeshift roof for the rest of the war, and the vaulted ceiling of the chancel was repaired. The actual reconstruction began in 1947, and was largely complete by 1959. In view of the previous damage by fire, the old wooden construction of the roof and spires was not replaced by a new wooden construction. All church spires in Lübeck were reconstructed using a special system involving lightweight concrete blocks underneath the copper roofing. The copper covering matched the original design and the concrete roof would avoid the possibility of a second fire. A glass window on the north side of the church commemorates the builder, Erich Trautsch, who invented this system.

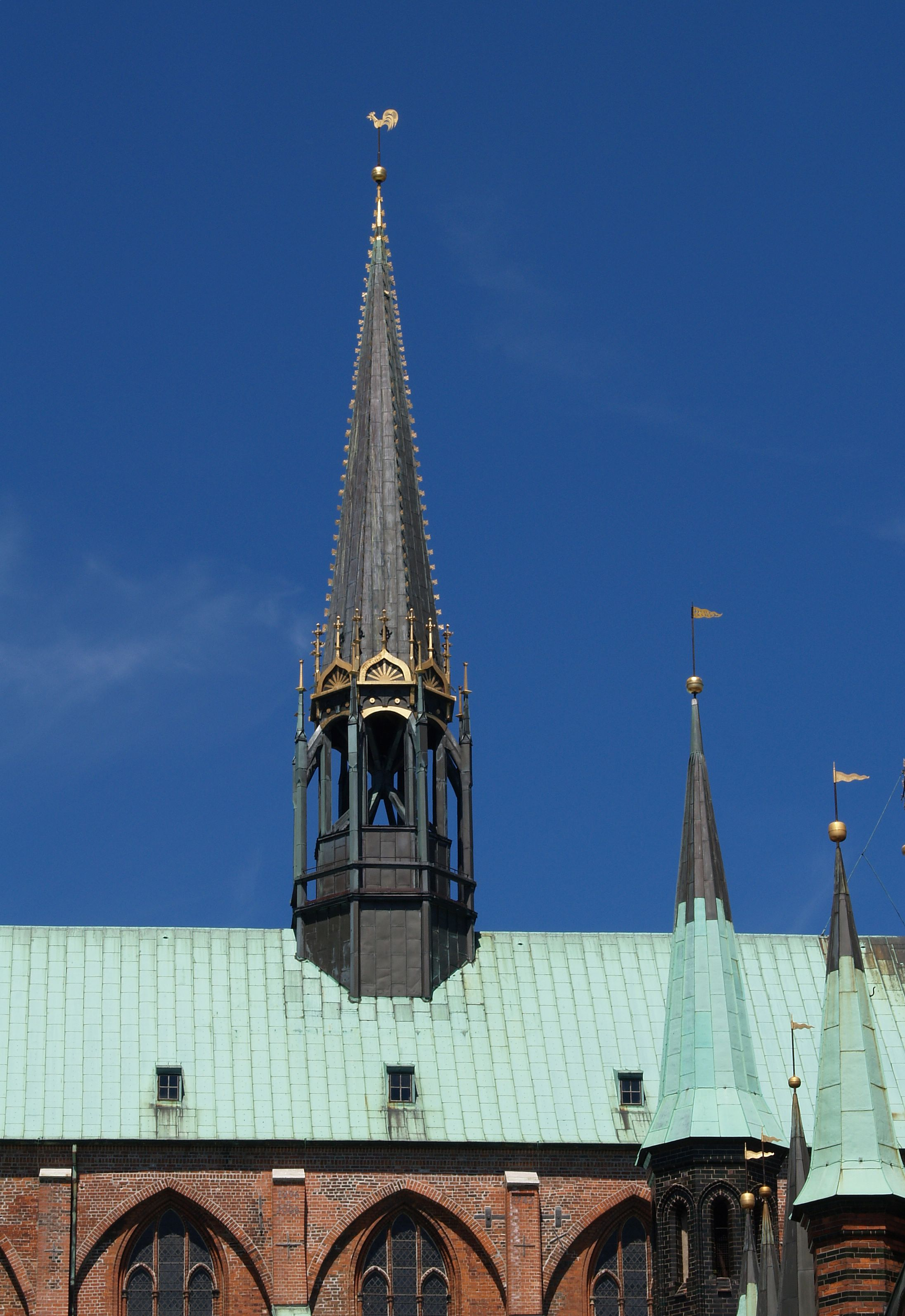
Roof spire

In 1951, the 700th anniversary of the church was celebrated under the reconstructed roof; for the occasion, Chancellor Konrad Adenauer donated the new tenor bell, and the Memorial Chapel Against War, featuring the broken bells in the South Tower, was inaugurated.

In the 1950s, there was a long debate about the design of the interior, not just the paintings (see below). The predominant view was that destruction had restored the essential, pure form. The redesign was intended to facilitate the dual function that St. Mary's had at that time, being both the diocesan church and the parish church. In the end, the church held a limited competition, inviting submissions from six architects, including Gerhard Langmaack and Denis Boniver, the latter's design being largely accepted on 8 February 1958. At the meeting, the bishop, Heinrich Meyer, vehemently – and successfully – demanded the removal of the Fredenhagen altar (see below).

The redesign of the interior according to Boniver's plans was carried out in 1958–59. Since underfloor heating was being installed under a completely new floor, the remaining memorial slabs of Gotland limestone were removed and used to raise the level of the chancel. The chancel was separated from the ambulatory by whitewashed walls 3 metres (9.8 ft) high. The Fredenhagen altar was replaced by a plain altar base of muschelkalk limestone and a crucifix by Gerhard Marcks suspended from the transverse arch of the ceiling. The inauguration of the new chancel was on 20 December 1959.

At the same time, a treasure chamber was made for the Danzig Parament Treasure from St. Mary's Church in Danzig (now Gdańsk), which was transferred to Lübeck after the War. The Parament Treasure is now exhibited at St. Anne's Museum, where a large organ loft had been built. The organ itself was not installed until 1968.

The gilded roof spire, which extends 30 metres (98 ft) higher than the nave roof, was recreated from old designs and photographs in 1980.

== Lothar Malskat and the frescos ==
The heat of the blaze in 1942 dislodged large sections of plaster, revealing the original decorative paintings of the Middle Ages, some of which were documented by photograph during the Second World War. In 1948 the task of restoring these gothic frescos was given to Dietrich Fey. In what became the largest counterfeit art scandal after the Second World War, Fey hired local painter Lothar Malskat to assist with this task, and together they used the photographic documentation to restore and recreate a likeness to the original walls. Since no paintings of the clerestory of the chancel were available, Fey had Malskat invent one. Malskat "supplemented" the restorations with his own work in the style of the 14th century. The forgery was only cleared up after Malskat reported his deeds to the authorities in 1952, and he and Fey received prison sentences in 1954. The major fakes were later removed from the walls, on the instructions of the bishop.

Lothar Malskat played an important part in the novel The Rat by Günter Grass.

== Interior decoration ==
C. 1400 fresco of St. Christopher painted high up on one of the nave pillars in St. Mary's Church (Marienkirche), Lübeck, Germany.

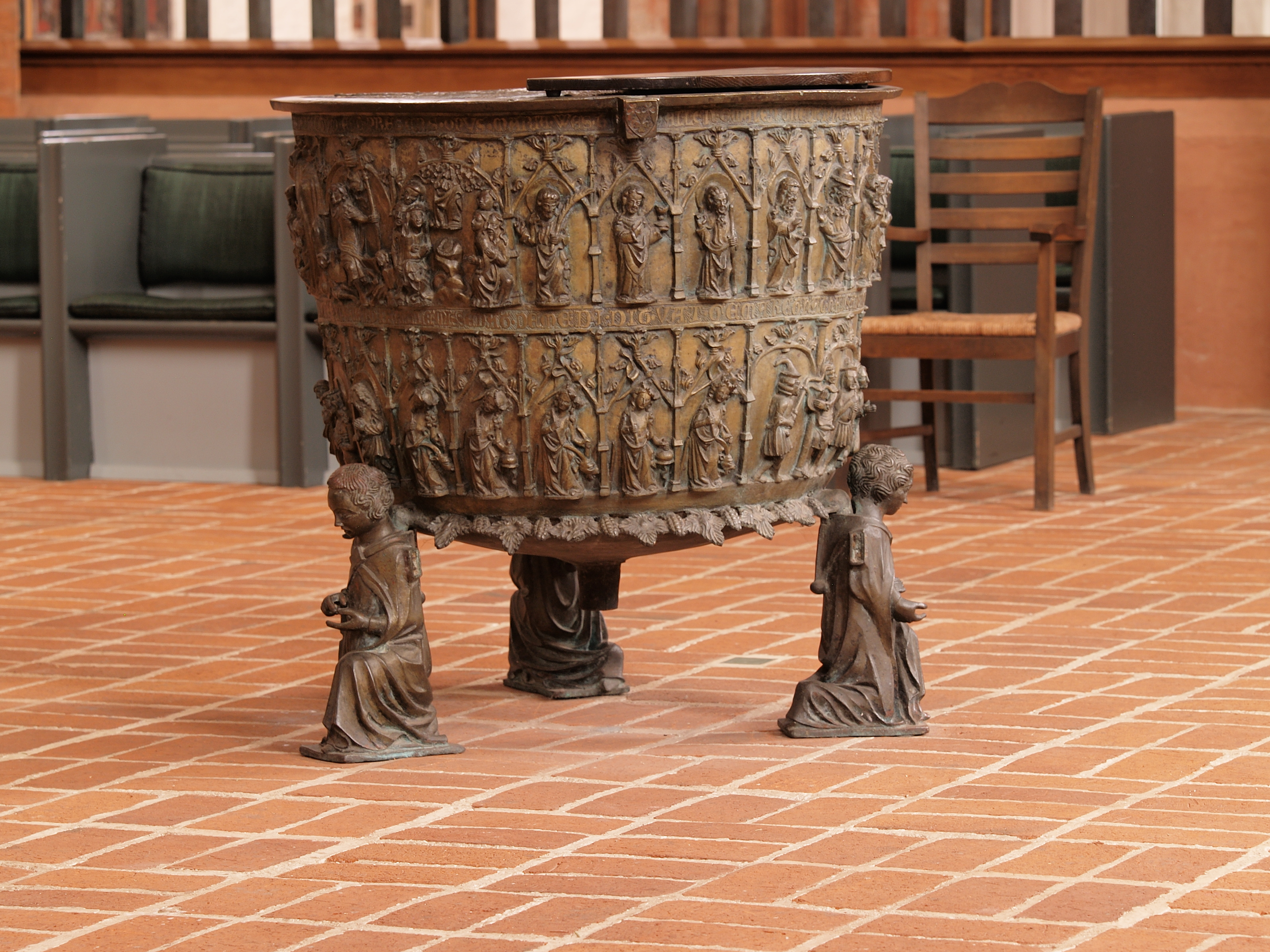
Medieval bronze font

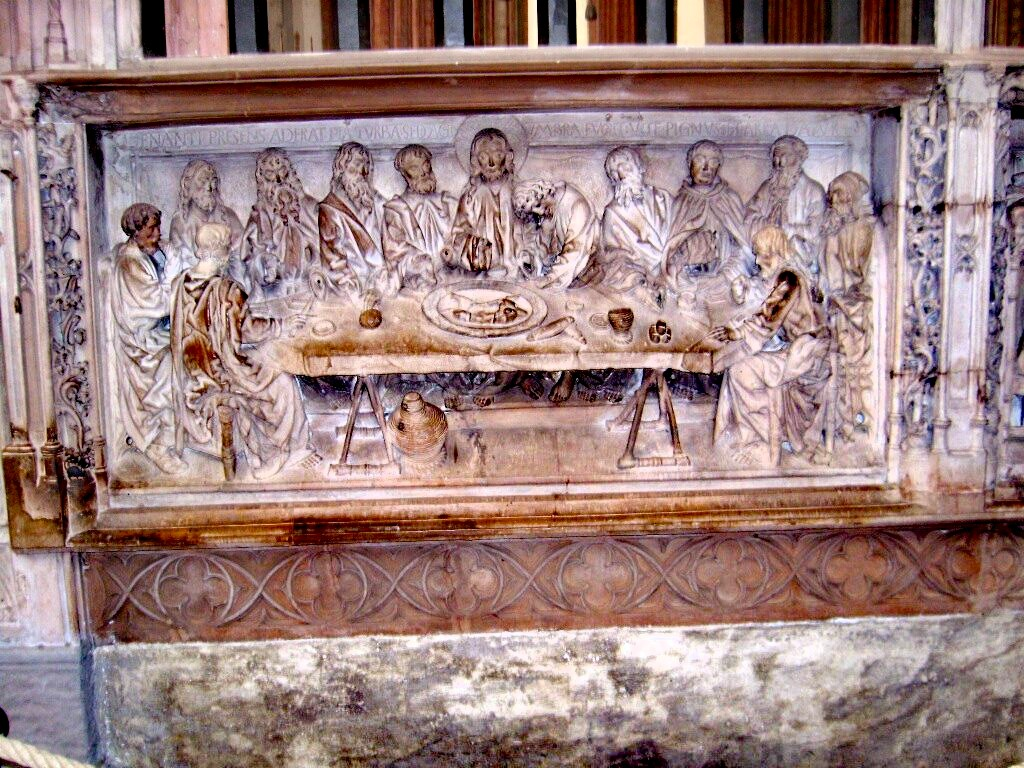
Last Supper relief in the ambulatory

St. Mary's Church was generously endowed with donations from the city council, the guilds, families, and individuals. At the end of the Middle Ages it had 38 altars and 65 benefices. The following mediaeval artefacts remain:

- A bronze baptismal font made by Hans Apengeter (1337). Until 1942 it was at the west end of the church; it is now in the middle of the chancel. It holds 406 litres (89 imperial gallons; 714 imperial pints), almost the same as a Hamburg or Bremen beer barrel, which holds 405 litres (89 imperial gallons; 713 imperial pints).
- Darsow Madonna from 1420, heavily damaged in 1942, restored from hundreds of individual pieces, put back in place again in 1989
- Tabernacle from 1479, 9.5 metres (31 ft) high, made by Klaus Grude using about 1000 individual bronze parts, some gilded, on the north wall of the chancel
- Winged altarpiece by Christian Swarte (c. 1495) with Woman of the Apocalypse, now installed behind the main altar
- Bronze burial slab by Bernt Notke for the Hutterock family (1505), in the Prayer Chapel (Gebetskapelle) in the north ambulatory
- Of the rood screen destroyed in 1942 only an arch and the stone statues remain: Elizabeth with John the Baptist as a child, Virgin and Child with Saint Anne, the Archangel Gabriel and Mary (Annunciation), John the Evangelist and St. Dorothy.
- In the ambulatory, sandstone reliefs (1515) from the atelier of Heinrich Brabender, with scenes from the Passion of Christ: to the north, the Washing of the Feet and the Last Supper; to the south, Christ in the garden of Gethsemane and his capture. The Last Supper relief includes a detail associated with Lübeck: a little mouse gnawing at the base of a rose bush. Touching it is supposed to mean that the person will never again return to Lübeck – or will have good luck, depending on the version of the superstition.
- Remains of the original pews and the Antwerp altarpiece (1518), in the Lady Chapel (Singers' Chapel)
- John the Evangelist, a wooden statue by Henning von der Heide (c. 1505)
- St. Anthony, a stone statue, donated in 1457 by the town councillor Hermann Sundesbeke, a member of the Brotherhood of St. Anthony
- Remains of the original gothic pews in the Burgomasters' Chapel in the southern ambulatory
- The Lamentation of Christ, one of the main works of the Nazarene Friedrich Overbeck, in the Prayer Chapel in the north ambulatory
- The choir screens separating the choir from the ambulatory are recent reconstructions. The walls that had been built for this purpose in 1959 were removed in the 1990s. The brass bars of the choir screens were mostly still intact, but the wooden parts had been almost completely destroyed by fire in 1942. The oak crown and frame were reconstructed on the basis of what remained of the original construction.

=== Antwerp altarpiece ===
Antwerp altarpiece in St. Mary's church, Lübeck

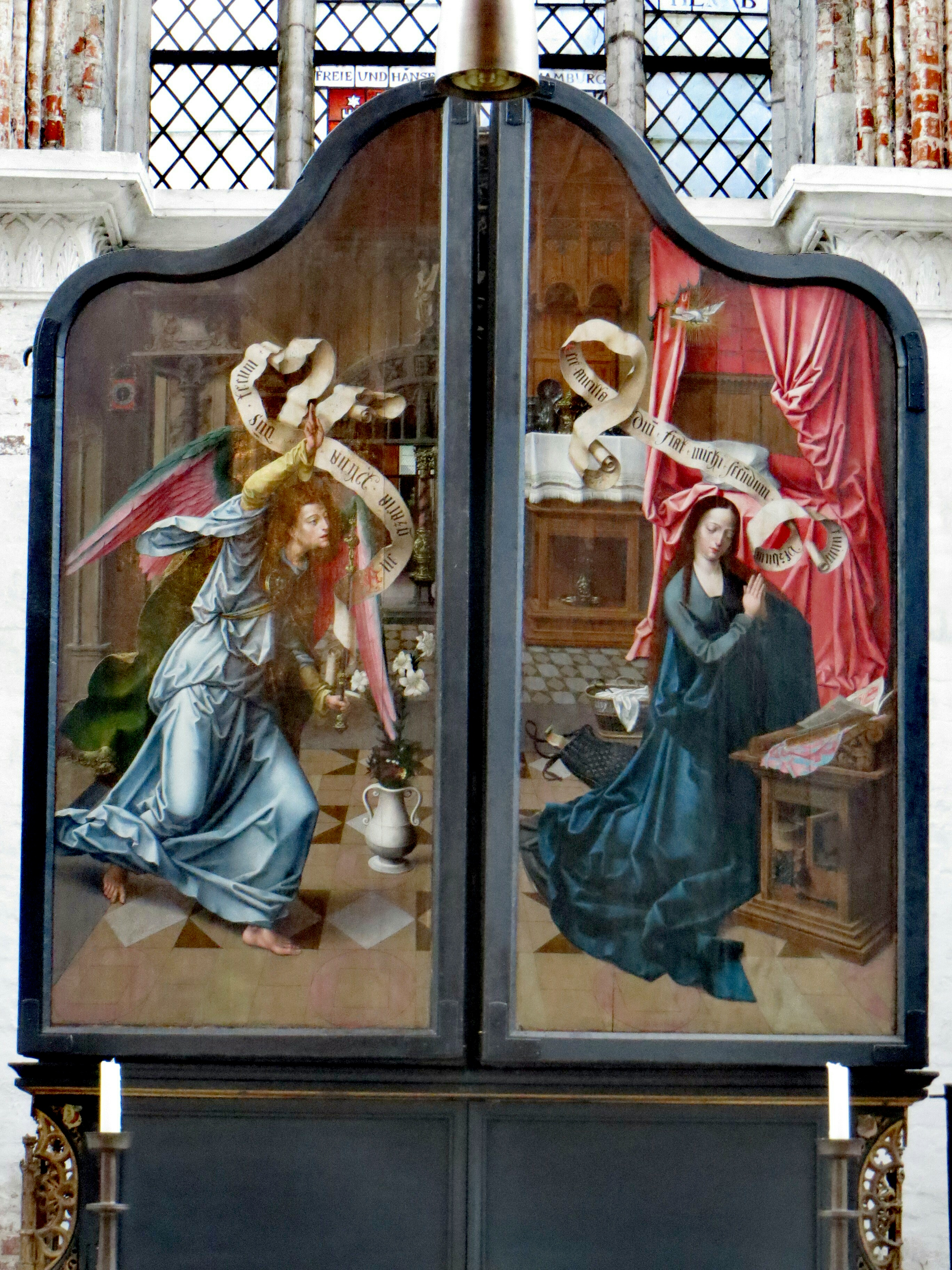
Closed

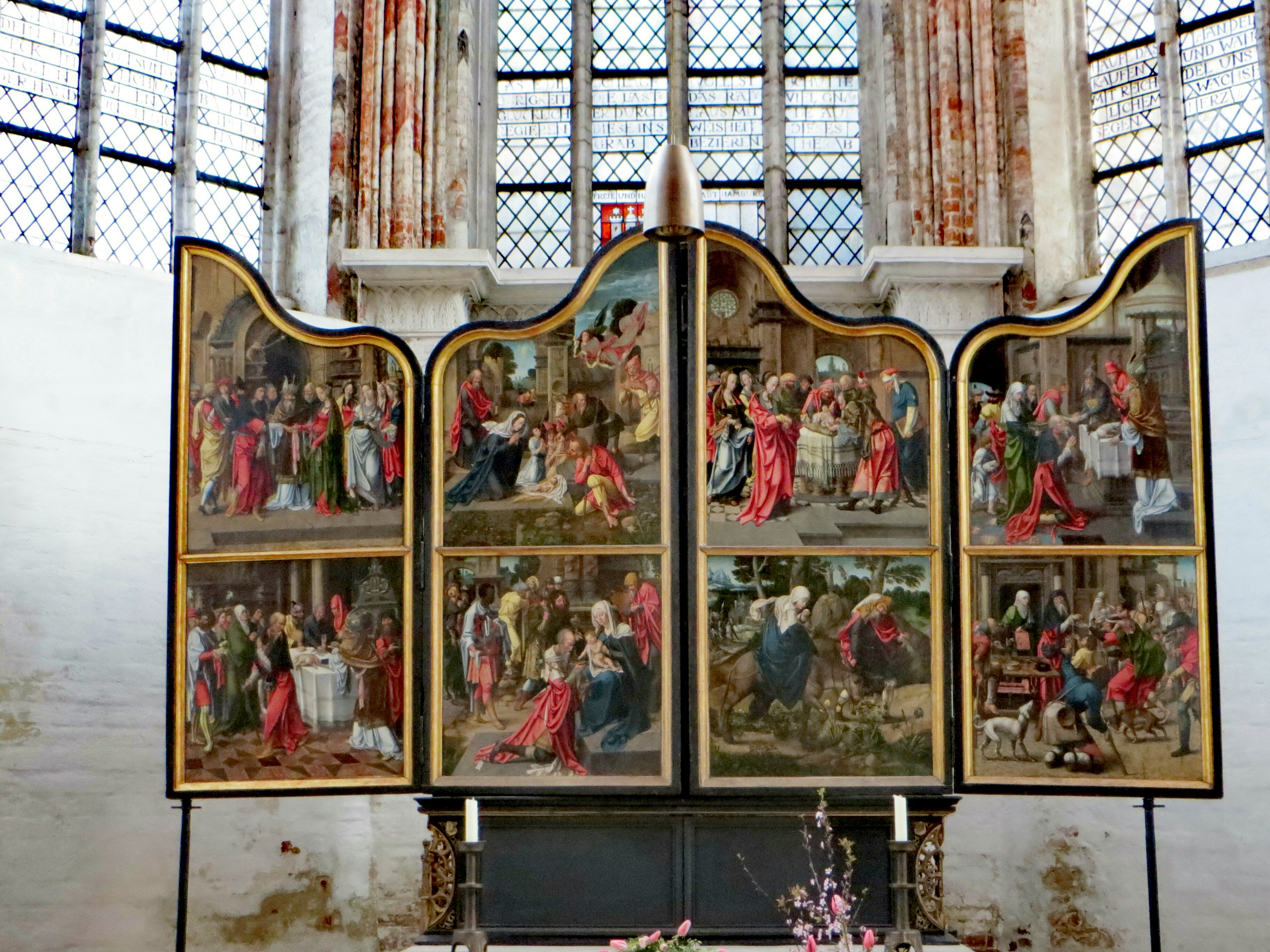
One pair of wings open (fasting days)

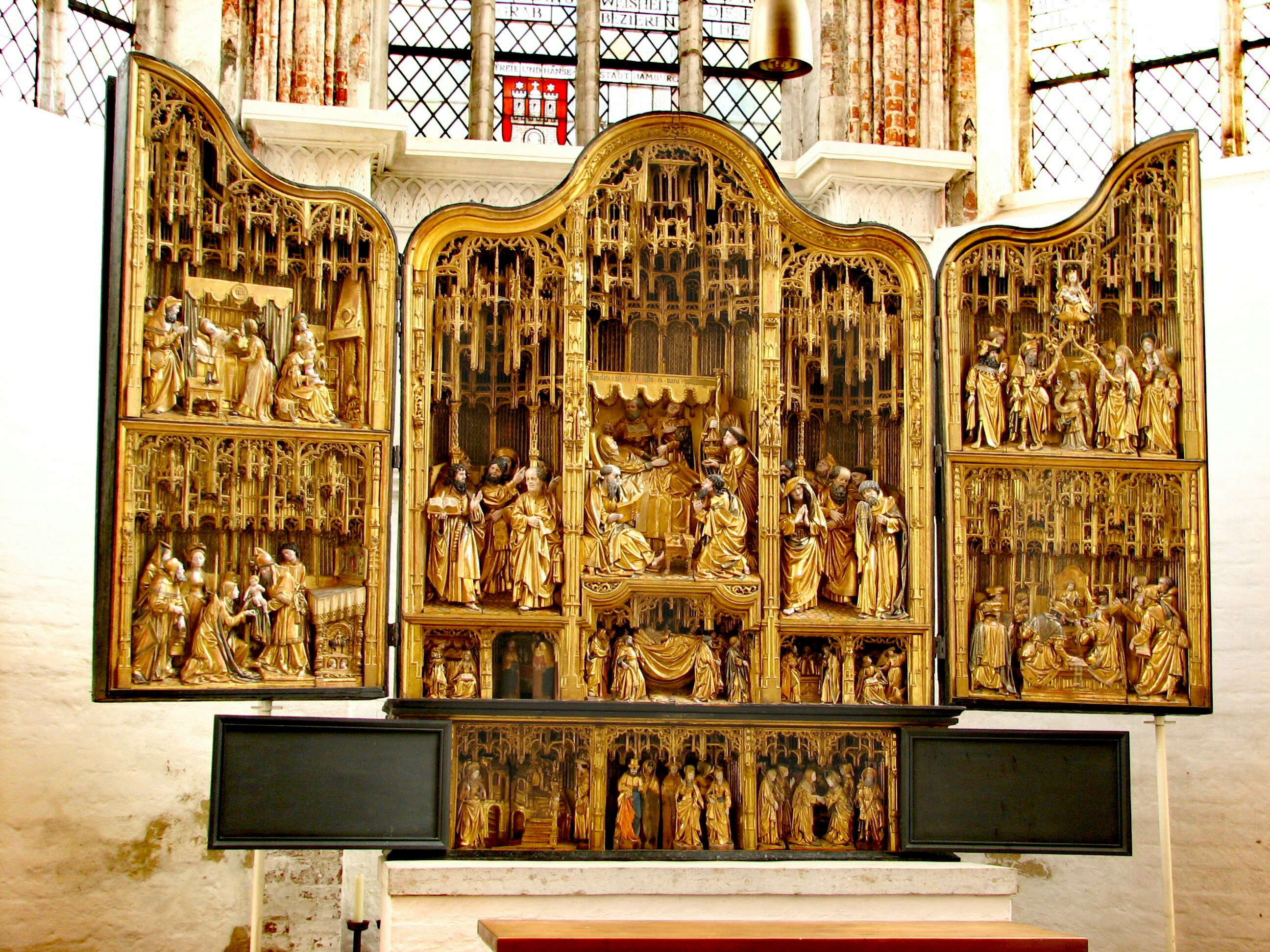
Fully open (feast days)

The Antwerp altarpiece in the Lady Chapel (Singers' Chapel) was created in 1518. It was donated for the chapel in 1522 by Johann Bone, a merchant from Geldern. After the chapel was converted into a confessional chapel in 1790, the altarpiece was moved around the church several times. During the Second World War, it was in the Chapel of Indulgences (Briefkapelle) and thus escaped destruction. The double-winged altarpiece depicts the life of the Virgin Mary in 26 painted and carved scenes.

- The fully closed position (nowadays, this is the position in the Christian Holy Week before Easter Sunday), shows the Annunciation by the Master of 1518.
- With one pair of wings open (as seen on fasting days) the paintings are of scenes from the lives of Jesus and Mary: the Adoration of the Shepherds, the Adoration of the Magi, the Circumcision of Jesus, and the Flight into Egypt; the wings show the marriage of Joachim and Anne, the rejection of Joachim's sacrifice, Joachim's sacrifice of thanksgiving, and Joachim giving alms to the poor on leaving the temple.
- With both pairs of wings open (on feast days), the carved centrepiece depicts the Death of the Virgin Mary; above that was a group depicting the Assumption of Mary but it was stolen in 1945; below it is the funeral procession; on the left is the Annunciation; and on the right is Mary's entombment. The carved left wing depicts the birth of Mary at the top and the Presentation of Jesus at the Temple at the bottom. The carved right wing depicts the Tree of Jesse above, and the twelve-year-old Jesus in the temple below.

Before 1869, the wings of the predella, which depict the legends of the Holy Kinship were removed, sawn to make panel paintings, and sold. In 1869, two such paintings from the private collection of the mayor of Lübeck Karl Ludwig Roeck were acquired for the collection in what is now St. Anne's Museum. Two more paintings from the outsides of the predella wings were acquired by the Kulturstiftung des Landes Schleswig-Holstein (Cultural foundation of Schleswig-Holstein) and have been in St. Anne's Museum since 1988. Of the remaining paintings, two are in the Staatsgalerie Stuttgart and two are in a private collection in Stockholm.

=== Memorials ===
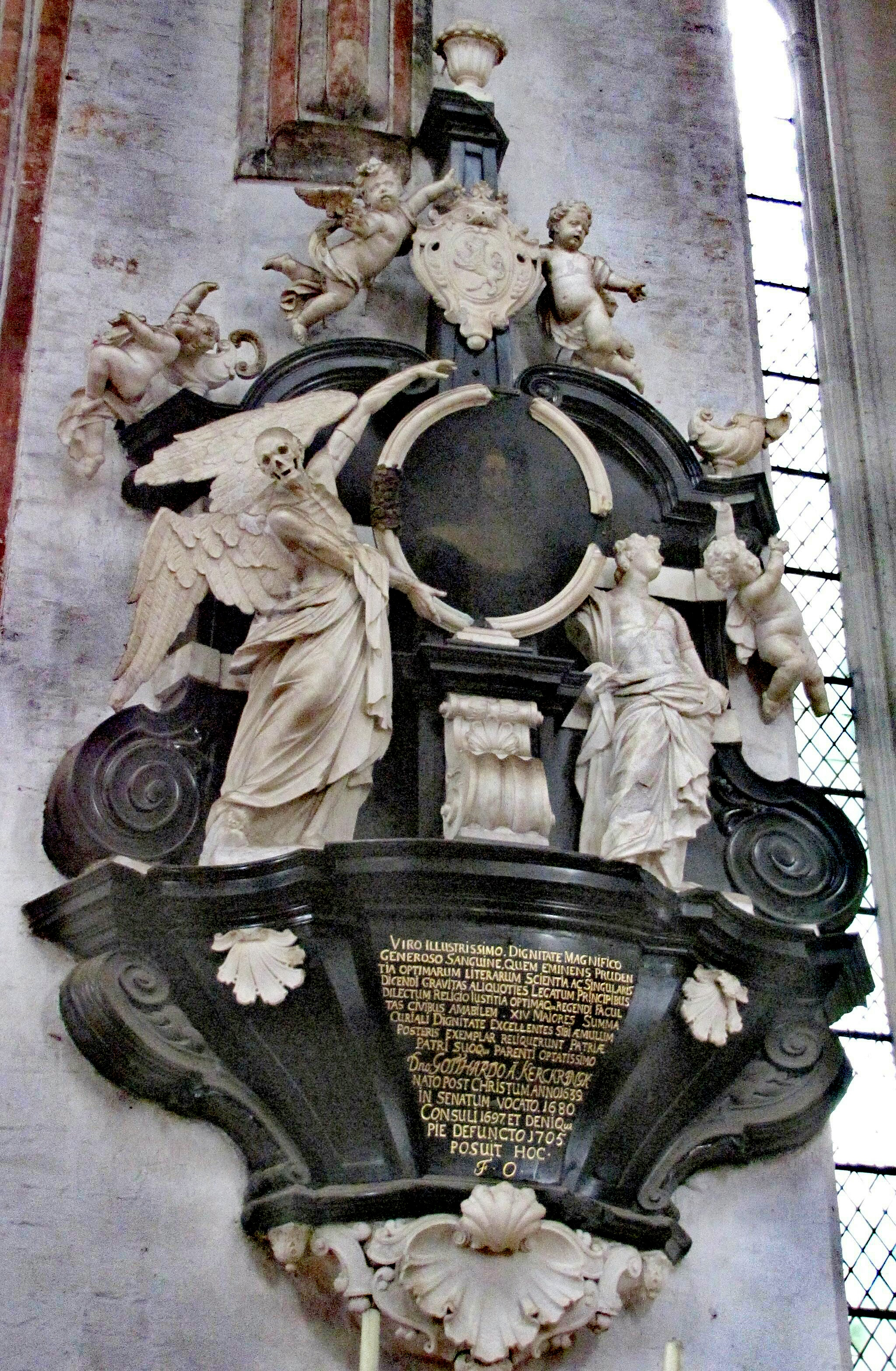
Memorial to Gotthard Kerkring

In the renaissance and baroque periods, the church space contained so many memorials that it became like a hall of fame of the Lübeck gentry. Memorials in the main nave, allowed from 1693, had to be made of wood, for structural reasons, but those in the side naves could also be made of marble. Of the 84 memorials that were still extant in the 20th century, almost all of the wooden ones were destroyed by the air raid of 1942, but 17, mostly stone ones on the walls of the side naves survived, some heavily damaged. Since these were mostly baroque works, they were deliberately ignored in the first phase of reconstruction, restoration beginning in 1973. They give an impression of how richly St. Mary's church was once furnished. The oldest is that of Hermann von Dorne, a mayor who died in 1594, a heraldic design with mediaeval echoes. The memorial to Johann Füchting, a former councillor and Hanseatic merchant who died in 1637, is a Dutch work of the transitional period between the Renaissance and Baroque times by the sculptor Aris Claeszon who worked in Amsterdam. After the phase of exuberant cartilage baroque, the examples of which were all destroyed by fire, Thomas Quellinus introduced a new type of memorial to Lübeck and created memorials in the dramatic style of Flemish High Baroque for

- the councillor Hartwig von Stiten, made in 1699;
- the councillor Adolf Brüning, made in 1706;
- the mayor Hieronymus von Dorne (who died in 1704) and
- the mayor Anton Winckler (1707),

the last one being the only one to remain undamaged. In the same year, the Lübeck sculptor Hans Freese created the memorial for councillor Gotthard Kerkring (who had died in 1705), whose oval portrait is held by a winged figure of death. A well-preserved example of the memorials of the next generation is the one for Peter Hinrich Tesdorpf, a mayor who died in 1723.

The Sepulchral Chapel of the Tesdorpf family contains a bust by Gottfried Schadowof mayor Johann Matthaeus Tesdorpf, which the Council presented to him in 1823 on the occasion of his anniversary as a member of the Council, and which was installed here in 1835. Among the later memorials is also the gravestone of mayor Joachim Peters by Landolin Ohmacht (c. 1795).

=== The Fredenhagen Altarpiece ===
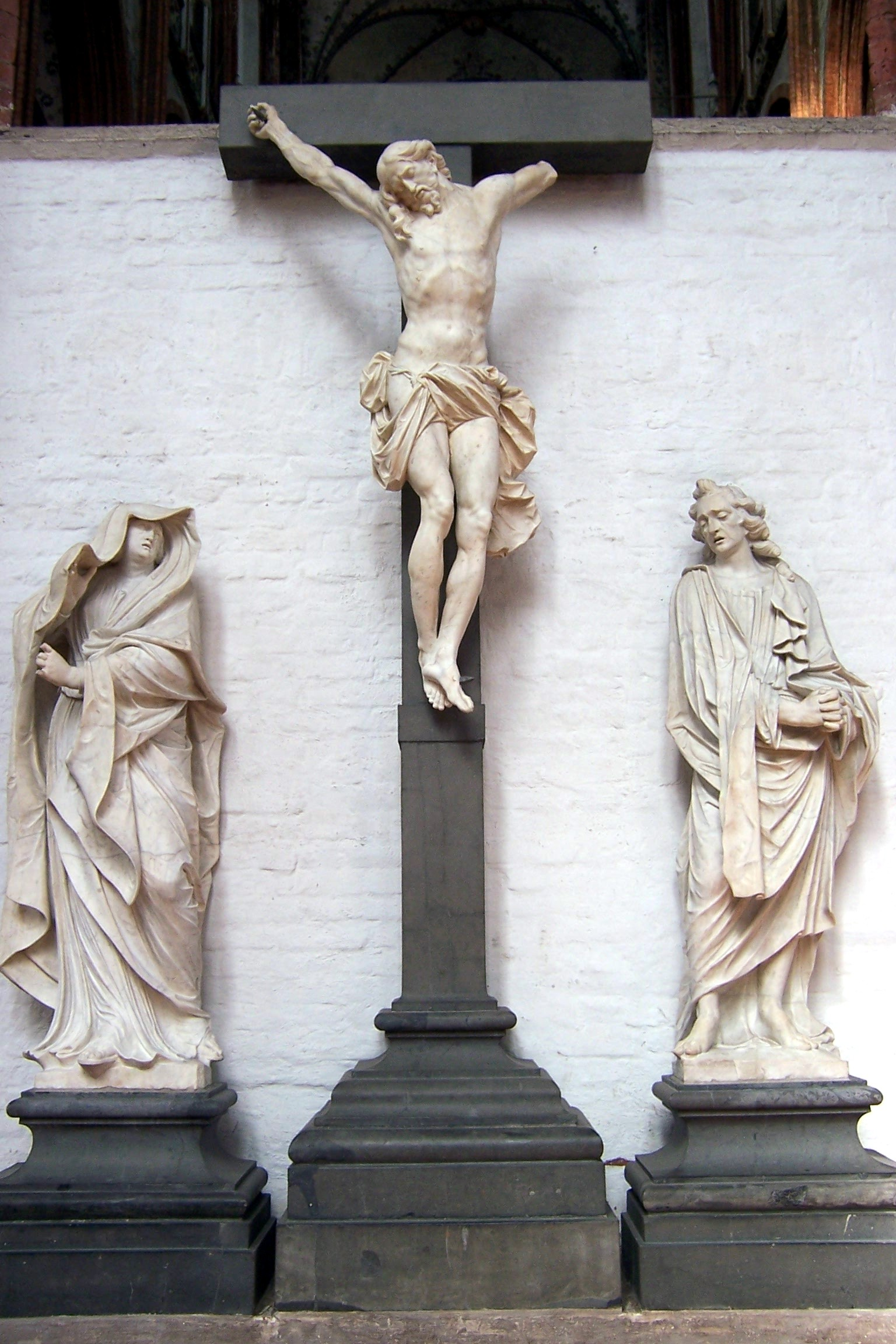
Calvary group from the Fredenhagen altarpiece, now in the ambulatory

The main item from the Baroque period, an altar with an altarpiece 18 metres (59 feet) high, donated by the merchant Thomas Fredenhagen and made by the Antwerp sculptor Thomas Quellinus from marble and porphyry (1697) was seriously damaged in 1942. After a lengthy debate lasting from 1951 to 1959, Heinrich Meyer, the bishop at the time, prevailed, and it was decided not to restore the altar but to replace it with a simple altar of limestone, with a bronze crucifix made by Gerhard Marcks. Speaking of the historical significance of the altar, the director of the Lübeck Museum at the time said that it was the only work of art of European stature that the Protestant Church in Lübeck had produced after the Reformation.

Individual items from the altarpiece are now in the ambulatory: the Calvary group with Mary and John, the marble predella with a relief of the Last Supper and the three crowned figures, the allegorical sculptures of Belief and Hope, and the Resurrected Christ. The other remains of the altar and altarpiece are now stored over the vaulted ceiling between the towers. The debate as to whether it is possible and desirable to restore the altar as a major work of baroque art of European stature is ongoing.

=== Stained glass ===
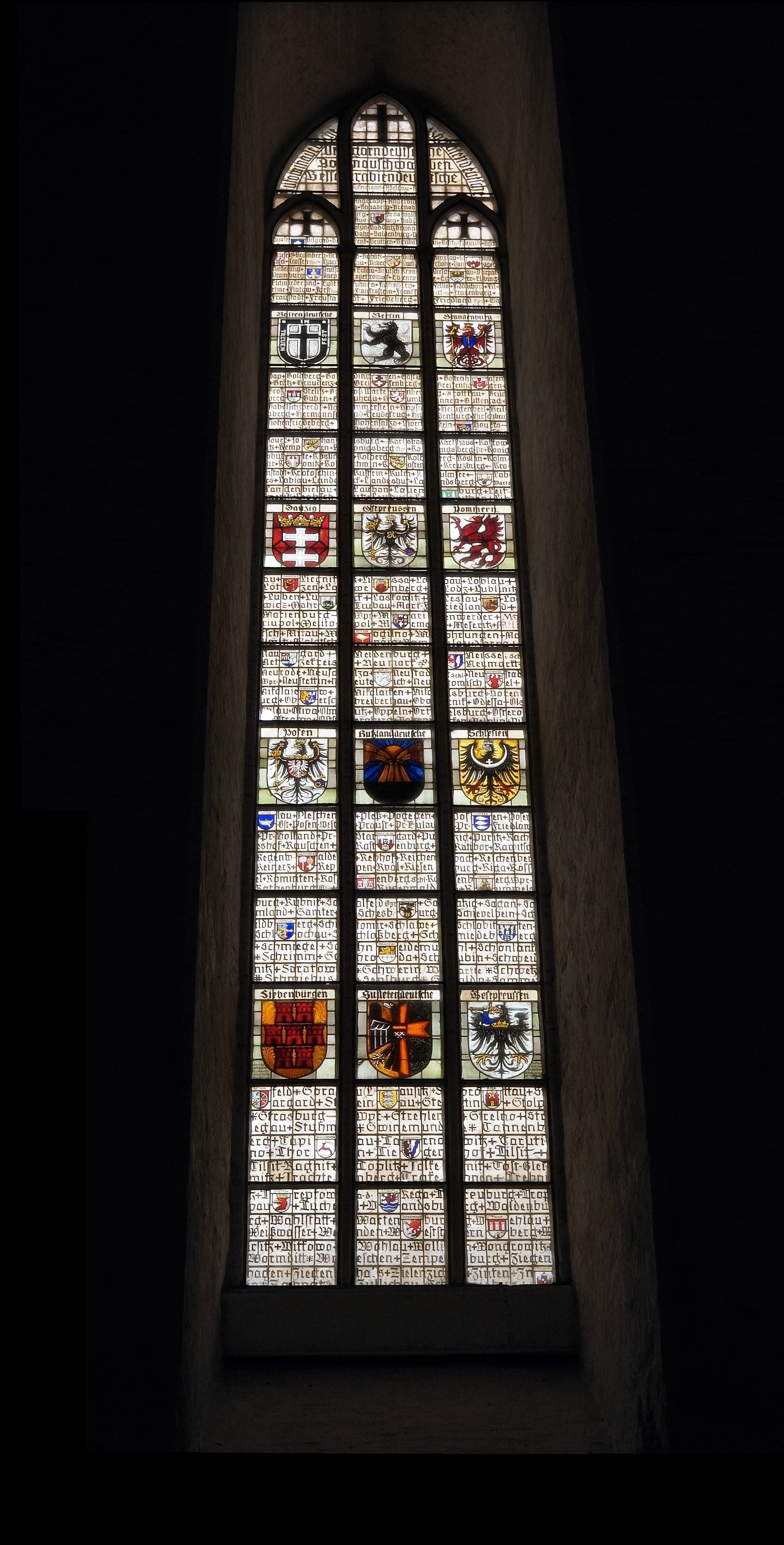
Window in the South Tower

Except for a few remains, the air raid of 1942 destroyed all the windows, including the stained glass windows that Carl Julius Milde had installed at Saint Mary's after they were rescued from the St. Mary Magdalene Church when the St. Mary Magdalene's Priory was demolished in the 19th century, and including the windows made by Professor Alexander Linnemann from Frankfurt in the late 19th century. In the reconstruction, simple diamond-pane leaded windows were used, mostly just decorated with the coat of arms of the donor, though some windows had an artistic design.

- The windows in the Singers' Chapel (Lady Chapel) depict the coat of arms of the Hanseatic towns of Bremen, Hamburg and Lübeck, and the lyrics of Buxtehude's Lübeck cantata, Schwinget euch himmelan (BuxWV 96).
- The monumental west window, designed by Hans Gottfried von Stockhausen, depicts the Day of Judgment.
- The window of the Memorial chapel (Gedenkkapelle) in the South Tower (which holds the destroyed bells), depicts coats of arms of towns, states and provinces of former eastern territories of Germany.
- Both windows in the Danse Macabre Chapel (Totentanzkapelle), which were designed by Alfred Mahlau in 1955/1956 and made in the Berkentien stained glass atelier in Lübeck, adopt motifs from the Danse Macabre painting that was destroyed by fire in 1942. They replace the Kaiserfenster (Emperor's Window), which was donated by Kaiser Wilhelm II on the occasion of his visit to Lübeck in 1913. It was manufactured by the Munich court stained glass artist Karl de Bouché and depicted the confirmation of the town privileges by Emperor Barbarossa.
- In 1981–82, windows by Johannes Schreiter were installed in the Chapel of Indulgences (Briefkapelle). Their ragged diamond pattern evokes not only the destruction of the church but also the torn nets of the Disciples (Luke 6).
- In December 2002, the tympanum window was added above the north portal of the Danse Macabre Chapel after a design by Markus Lüpertz.

This window, like the windows by Johannes Schreiter in the Chapel of Indulgences (Briefkapelle), was manufactured and assembled by Derix Glass Studios in Taunusstein.

== Churchyard ==
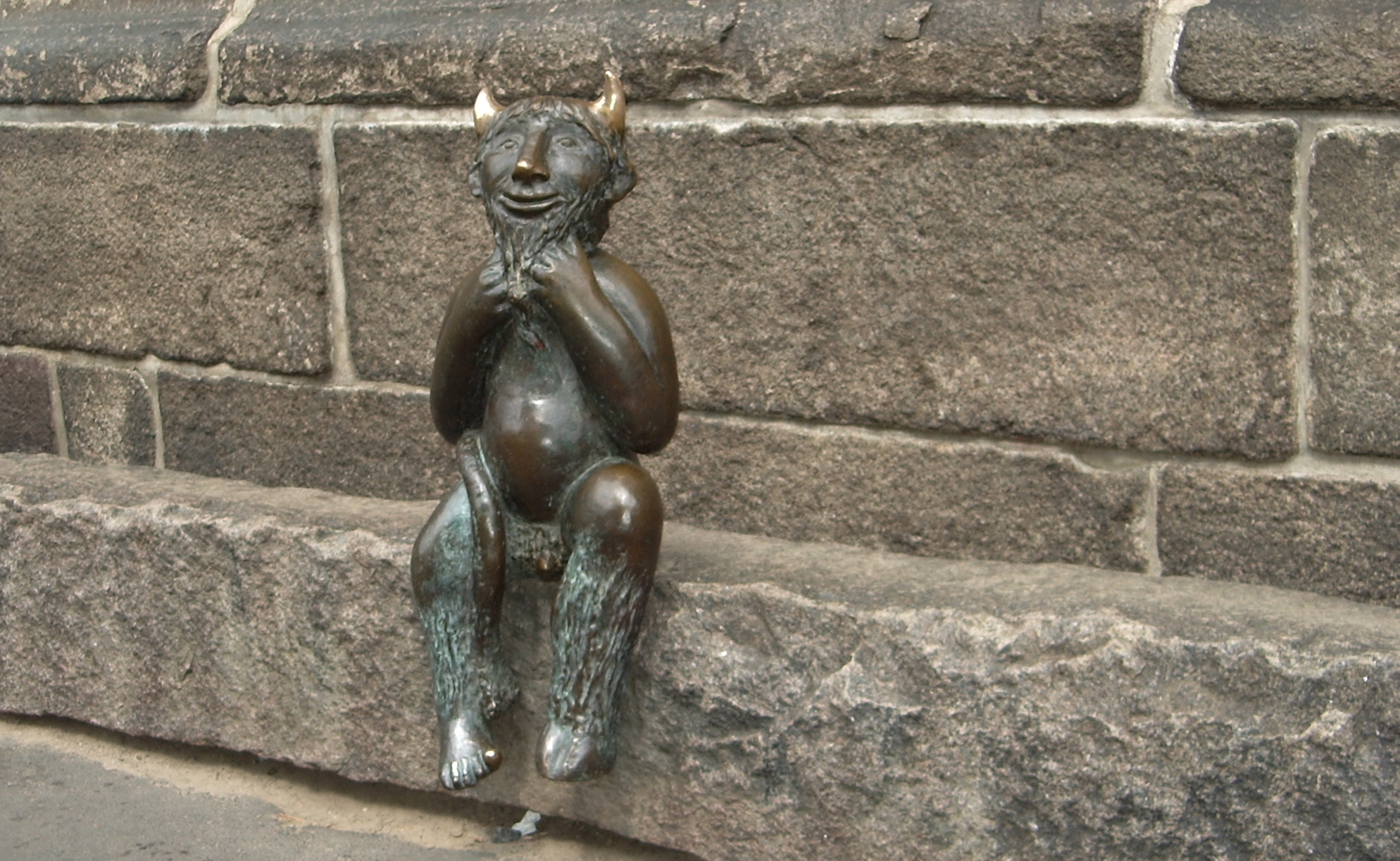
The Devil at St. Mary's Church in Lübeck, sculpture by Rolf Goerler, 1999

Saint Mary's Churchyard, with its views of the north face of the Lübeck Town Hall, the Kanzleigebäude, and the Marienwerkhaus has the ambiance of a mediaeval town.

The architectural features include the subjects of Lübeck legends; a large block of granite to the right of the entrance was supposedly not left there by the builders but put there by the Devil.

To the north and west of the church, the courtyard is now an open space, mediaeval buildings having been removed. At the corner between Schüsselbuden and Mengstraße are the remaining stone foundations of the Maria am Stegel Chapel (1415), which served as a bookshop before the Second World War. In the late 1950s, it was decided not to reconstruct it, and the remaining external walls of the ruins were cleared away. On Mengstraße, opposite the churchyard, is a building with facades from the 18th century: the clergy house known as die Wehde, which also gave its name to the courtyard that lies behind it, the Wehdehof.

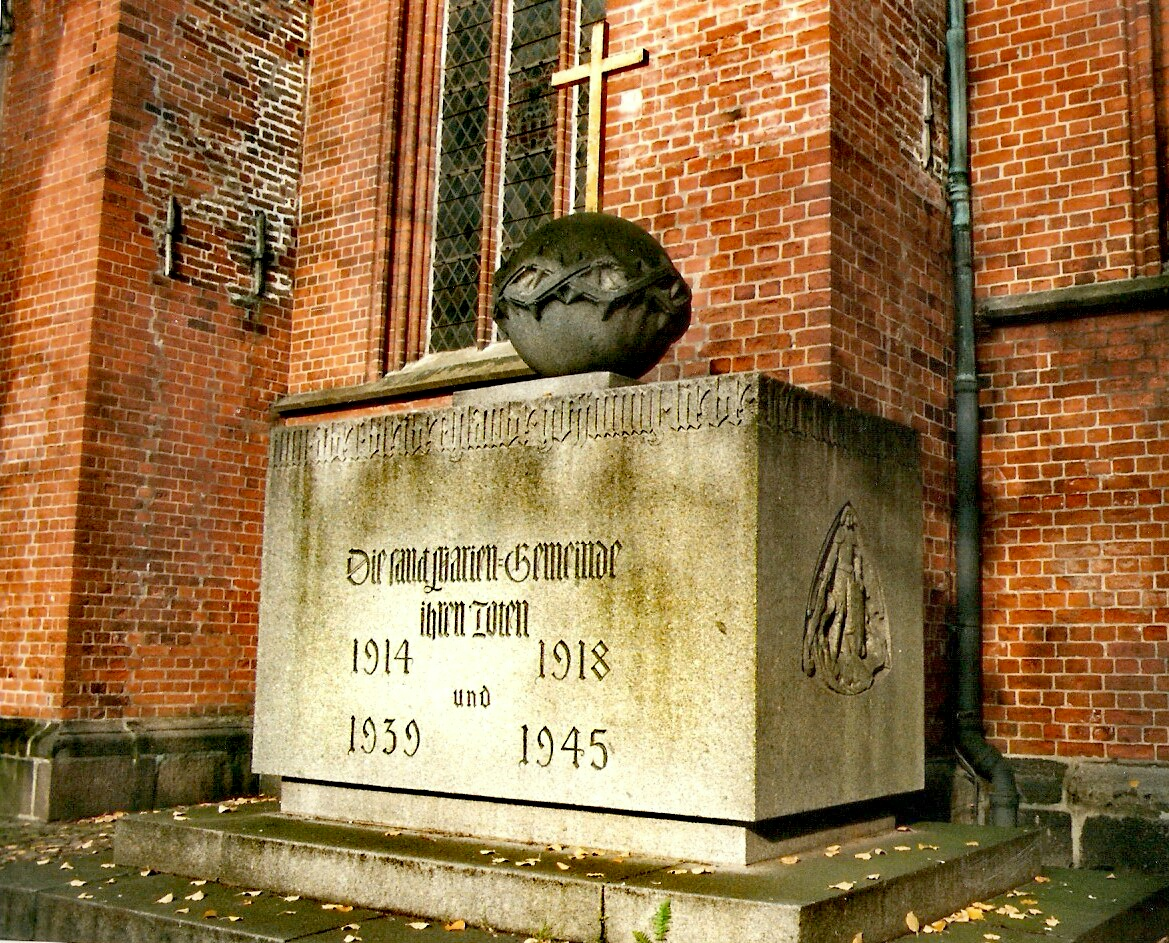
Memorial stone of St. Mary's congregation

The war memorial, created in 1929 by the sculptor Hermann Joachim Pagels 1929 on behalf of the congregation of the church to commemorate their dead, is made of Swedish granite from Karlshamn. The inscription reads (in translation):

The congregation of St. Mary's

in memory of their dead

1914 1918

(to which was added after the Second World War)

and

1939 1945

== Pastors ==
Since the Reformation, St. Mary's Church has been where the top Lutheran clergyman of the city preached. Until 1796 this was the superintendent. After that, Lübeck's senior clergymen varied; three of them were pastors at St. Mary's From 1934 to 1973 St. Mary's was the church of the bishop of the Evangelical Lutheran Church in Lübeck. Since the establishment of the North Elbian Evangelical Lutheran Church, St. Mary has been where the provost responsible for Lübeck has preached. Since the establishment of the Evangelical Lutheran Church in Northern Germany in 2012 St. Mary's has been the church of the provost for the area of Lübeck within the church district of Lübeck–Lauenburg.

- 1532–1548: Hermann Bonnus
- 1553–1567: Valentin Curtius
- 1575–1600: Andreas Pouchenius the Elder
- 1613–1622: Georg Stampelius
- 1624–1643: Nicolaus Hunnius
- 1646–1671: Meno Hanneken
- 1675–1683: Samuel Pomarius
- 1689–1698: August Pfeiffer
- 1702–1728: Georg Heinrich Götze
- 1730–1767: Johann Gottlob Carpzov
- 1771–1774: Johann Andreas Cramer
- 1779–1796: Johann Adolph Schinmeier
- 1892–1909: Leopold Friedrich Ranke
- 1914–1919: Johannes Becker
- 1919–1933: Johannes Evers
- 1934–1945: Erwin Balzer, bishop
- 1948–1955: Johannes Pautke, bishop
- 1956–1972: Heinrich Meyer
- 1972–1977: Karlheinz Stoll, senior clergyman
- 1979–2001: Niels Hasselmann, provost
- 2001–2008: Ralf Meister, provost
- Since 2008: Petra Kallies, provost

Other famous pastors at St. Mary's were:

- 1614–1648: Michael Siricius, priest from 1614, principal pastor from 1625
- 1626–1668: Jacob Stolterfoht, priest from 1626, principal pastor from 1649
- 1706–1743: Jacob von Melle, principal pastor and Polyhistor
- 1743–1750: Christoph Anton Erasmi, priest
- 1751–1759: Johann Hermann Becker, principal pastor
- 1829–1867: Johann Funk, principal pastor
- 1832–1884: Peter Hermann Münzenberger
- 1966–1979: Hans-Joachim Thilo

Once there were three generations in succession:

- 1713–1750: Bernhard Heinrich von der Hude (1681–1750), priest from 1713, principal pastor from 1743
- 1757–1795: Bernhard Heinrich von der Hude (1731–1795), priest from 1757, principal pastor from 1775, senior clergyman from 1788
- 1794–1828: Bernhard Heinrich von der Hude (1768–1828), 1794 priest, from 1800 principal pastor.

== Music ==
=== Main organ ===
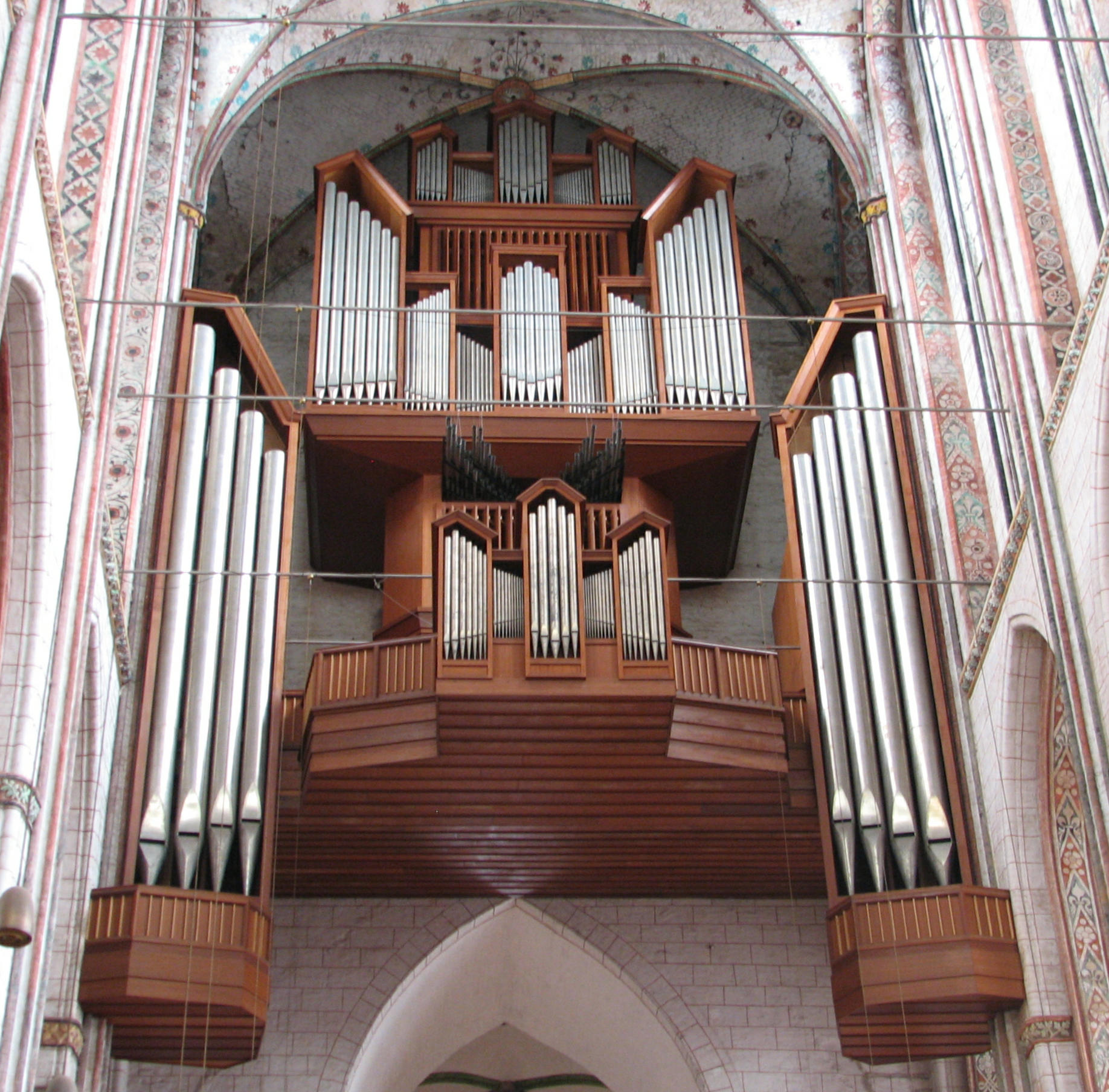
Great Organ

St. Mary's is known to have had an organ in the 14th century, since the occupation "organist" is mentioned in a will from 1377. The old great organ was built in 1516–1518 under the direction of Martin Flor on the west wall as a replacement for the great organ of 1396. It had 32 stops, 2 manuals and a pedalboard. This organ, "in all probability the first and only Gothic organ with a thirty-two-foot principal (deepest pipe, 11 metres long) in the western world of the time", (Note: German: mit größter Wahrscheinlichkeit die erste und einzige gotische Orgelfassade mit einem Zweiunddreißigfuß-Prinzipal (tiefste Pfeife rund 11 Meter lang) in der damaligen abendländischen Welt) was repeatedly expanded and rebuilt over the centuries. For instance, the organist and organ-builder Barthold Hering (who died in 1555) carried out a number of repairs and additions; in 1560/1561 Jacob Scherer added a chest division with a third manual. From 1637 to 1641, Friederich Stellwagen carried out a number of modifications. Otto Diedrich Richborn added three registers in 1704. In 1733, Konrad Büntung exchanged four registers, changed the arrangement of the manuals and added couplers. In 1758, his son, Christoph Julius Bünting added a small swell division with three voices, the action being controllable from the breast division manual. By the beginning of the 19th century the organ had 3 manuals and a pedalboard, 57 registers and 4,684 pipes. In 1851, however, a completely new organ was installed – built by Johann Friedrich Schulze, in the spirit of the time, with four manuals, a pedalboard, and 80 voices, behind the historic organ case by Benedikt Dreyer, which was restored and added to by Carl Julius Milde. This great organ was destroyed in 1942 and was replaced in 1968 by what was then the largest mechanical-action organ in the world. It was built by Kemper & Son. It has 5 manuals and a pedalboard, 100 stops and 8,512 pipes; the longest are 11 metres (36 feet), the smallest is the size of a cigarette. The tracker action operates electrically and has free combinations; the stop tableau is duplicated.

=== Danse macabre organ (choir organ) ===
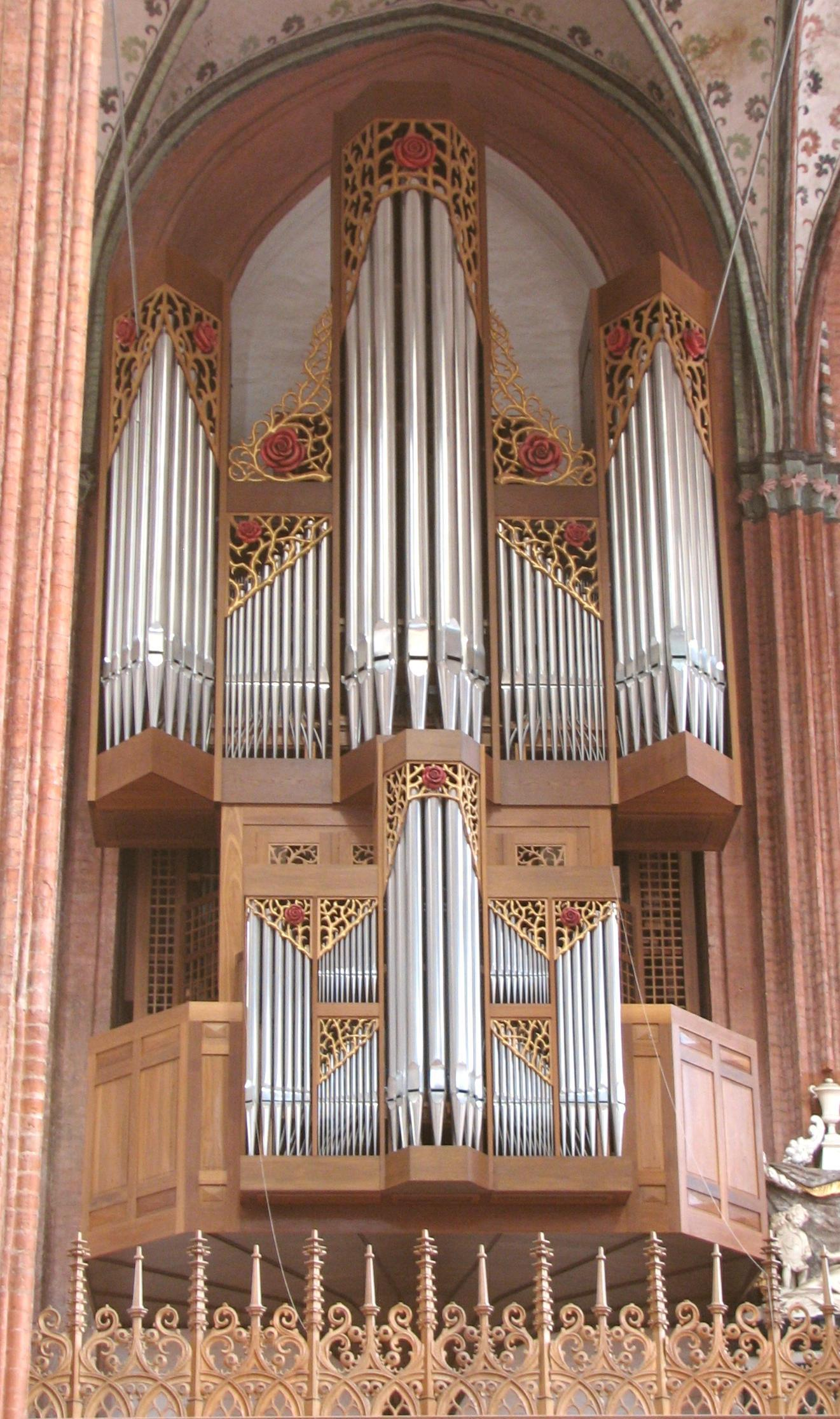
Danse Macabre organ

The Dance macabre organ (Totentanzorgel) was older than the old great organ. It was installed in 1477 on the east side of the north arm of the "transept" in the Danse Macabre Chapel (so named because of the Danse Macabre painting that hung there) and was used for the musical accompaniment of the requiem masses that were celebrated there. After the Church Reformation it was used for prayers and for Holy Communion services. In 1549 and 1558 Jakob Scherer added to the organ among other things, a chair organ (Rückpositiv), and in 1621 a chest division was added. Friedrich Stellwagen also carried out extensive repairs from 1653 to 1655. Thereafter, only minor changes were made. For this reason, this organ, together with the Arp Schnitger organ in St. James' Church in Hamburg and the Stellwagen Organ in St James' Church in Lübeck, attracted the interest of organ experts in connection with the Orgelbewegung. The disposition of the organ was changed back to what it had been in the 17th century. But, like the main organ, this organ was also destroyed in 1942.

In 1955 the organ builders Kemper & Son restored the Danse Macabre organ in accordance with its 1937 dimensions, but now in the northern part of the ambulatory, in the direction of the raised choir. Its original place is now occupied by the astronomical clock. This post-War organ, which was very prone to malfunction, was replaced in 1986 by a new Danse Macabre organ, built by Führer Co. in Wilhelmshaven and positioned in the same place as its predecessor. It has a mechanical tracker action, with four manuals and a pedalboard, 56 stops and approximately 5,000 pipes. This organ is particularly suited for accompanying prayers and services, as well as an instrument for older organ music up to Bach.

As a special tradition at St Mary's, on New Year's Eve the chorale Now Thank We All Our God is accompanied by both organs, kettledrums and a brass band.

=== Other instruments ===
There used to be an organ on the rood screen, as a basso continuo instrument for the choir that was located there – the church's third organ. In 1854 the breast division that was removed from the Great Organ (built in 1560–1561 by Jacob Scherer) when it was converted was installed here. This "rood screen organ" had one manual and seven stops and was replaced in 1900 by a two-manual pneumatic organ made by the organ builder Emanuel Kemper, the old organ box being retained. This organ, too, was destroyed in 1942.

In the Chapel of Indulgences (Briefkapelle) there is a chamber organ originally from East Prussia. It has been in the chapel since 1948. It has a single manual and eight voices, with separate control of bass and descant parts. It was built by Johannes Schwarz in 1723 and from 1724 was the organ of the Schloßkapelle (Castle Chapel) of Dönhofstädt near Rastenburg (now Kętrzyn, Poland). From there it was acquired by Lübeck organ builder Karl Kemper in 1933. For a few years it was in the choir of St. Catherine's Church, Lübeck. Then, Walter Kraft brought it, as a temporary measure, to the Chapel of Indulgences at St. Mary's, this being the first part of the church to be ready for church services after the War. Today this organ provides the accompaniment for prayers as well as the Sunday services that are held in the Chapel of Indulgences from January to March.

=== Organists ===
Two 17th-century organists, especially, shaped the development of the musical tradition of St. Mary's: Franz Tunder from 1642 until his death in 1667, and his successor and son-in-law, Dieterich Buxtehude, from 1668 to 1707. Both were defining representatives of the north German organ school and were prominent both as organists and as composers.A memorial tablet for Dieterich Buxtehude is located inside St. Mary's Church, Lübeck (Marienkirche) to honor the legendary Baroque organist and composer who served at the church from 1668 to 1707. In 1705 Johann Sebastian Bach then a young man of twenty, walked from Arnstadt to Lübeck, a distance of more than 400 kilometres (250 mi), and stayed nearly three months, to meet the pre-eminent Lübeck organist and to hear him play, as well as to observe and learn from Buxtehude. A 1920s stone relief in the church shows Bach and Buxtehude together at an organ console. (Note: It is rumoured that he was offered the post of organist as Buxtehude's successor but refused. Lübeck travel guides ascribe this refusal to a condition that he would have had to marry Buxtehude's daughter.) Georg Friedrich Händel and Johann Mattheson had already been guests of Buxtehude in 1703. Since then, the position of organist at St. Mary's Church has been one of the most prestigious in Germany.

With their evening concerts, Tunder and Buxtehude were the first to introduce church concerts independent of religious services. Buxtehude developed a fixed format, with a series of five concerts on the two last Sundays of the Trinity period (i.e. the last two Sundays before Advent) and the second, third, and fourth Sunday in Advent. This very successful series of concerts was continued by Buxtehude's successors, Johann Christian Schieferdecker (1679–1732), Johann Paul Kunzen (1696–1757), his son Adolf Karl Kunzen (1720–1781) and Johann Wilhelm Cornelius von Königslöw.

For the evening concerts they each composed a series of Biblical oratorios, including Israels Abgötterey in der Wüsten [Israel's Idol Worship in the Desert] (1758), Absalon (1761) and Goliath (1762) by Adolf Kunzen and ''Die Rettung des Kindes Mose [The Finding of Baby Moses] and Der geborne Weltheiland [The Saviour of the World is born] (1788), Tod, Auferstehung and Gericht [Death, Resurrection and Judgment] (1790), and Davids Klage am Hermon nach dem 42ten Psalm [David's Lament on Mount Hermon (Psalm 42)] (1793) by Königslöw.

Around 1810 this tradition ended for a time. Attitudes towards music and the Church had changed, and external circumstances (the occupation by Napoleon's troops and the resulting financial straits) made such expensive concerts impossible.

In the early 20th century it was the organist Walter Kraft (1905–1977) who tried to revive the tradition of the evening concerts, starting with an evening of Bach's organ music, followed by an annual programme of combined choral and organ works. In 1954 Kraft created the Lübecker Totentanz (Lübeck Danse Macabre) as a new type of evening concert.

The tradition of evening concerts continues today under the current organist (since 2009), Johannes Unger.

=== List of organists ===
- c. 1516–1518 (?) Barthold Hering
- –1572: David Ebel
- 1597–1611: Heinrich Marcus
- 1612–1616: Hermann Ebel
- 1616–1640: Peter Hasse
- 1642–1667: Franz Tunder
- 1668–1707: Dietrich Buxtehude
- 1707–1732: Johann Christian Schieferdecker
- 1733–1757: Johann Paul Kunzen
- 1757–1781: Adolf Karl Kunzen
- 1781–1833: Johann Wilhelm Cornelius von Königslöw
- 1834–1844: Gottfried Herrmann
- 1845–1886: Hermann Jimmerthal
- 1887–1929: Karl Lichtwark
- 1929–1973: Walter Kraft
- 1973–2009: Ernst-Erich Stender
- since 2009: Johannes Unger

== Today ==
=== Congregation ===
Since the establishment of Johannes Bugenhagen's Lutheran Church Order by the town council in 1531 St. Mary has been Protestant. Today it is the main church of the Lübeck district of the Evangelical Lutheran Church of Northern Germany. Services are held on Sundays and Church festivals from 10 o'clock. From Mondays to Saturdays in the summer season and in Advent there is a short prayer service with organ music at noon (after the parade of the figures of the Astronomical Clock), which tourists and locals are invited to attend. Since 15 March 2010 there has been an admission charge of two euros for visitors.

== Astronomical clock ==
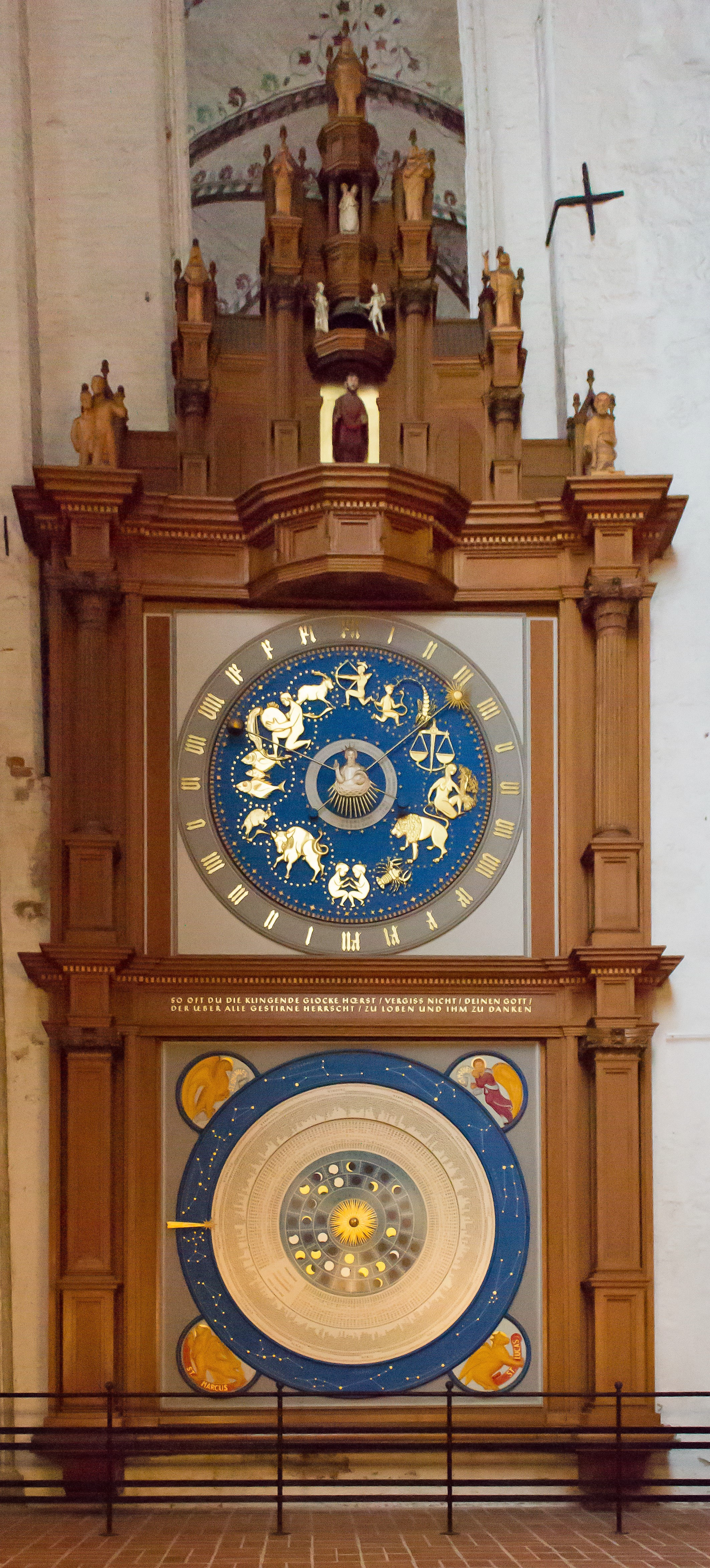
The new Astronomical Clock

The astronomical clock was built in 1561–1566. It used to stand in the ambulatory behind the high altar, but was completely destroyed in 1942. Only a clock dial that was replaced during a previous restoration remains, in St. Anne's Museum. The new Astronomical Clock was installed on the East side of the Northern transept, in the Danse Macabre Chapel. It is the work of Paul Behrens, a Lübeck clockmaker, who planned it as his lifetime achievement from 1960 to 1967. He collected donations for it, made the clock, including all its parts, and maintained the clock until his death. The clock front is a simplified copy of the original. Calendar and planetary discs controlled by a complicated mechanical movement show the day and the month, the position of the sun and the moon, the signs of the zodiac (the thirteen astronomical signs, not the twelve astrological signs), the date of Easter, and the golden number.

At noon, the clock chimes and a procession of figures passes in front of the figure of Christ, who blesses each of them. The figures originally represented the prince-electors of the Holy Roman Empire; since the post-War reconstruction, they represent eight representatives of the peoples of the world.

=== Carillon ===
After the War, a carillon with 36 bells was installed in the South Tower. Some of the bells came from St Catherine's Church in Danzig (now Gdańsk, Poland). On the hour and half-hour, choral melodies are played, alternating according to the season. Formerly the carillon was operated by a complicated electromechanical system of cylinders; the mechanism is now computer-controlled. At Christmas and Easter, the organist plays the clock chimes manually.

=== Bells ===
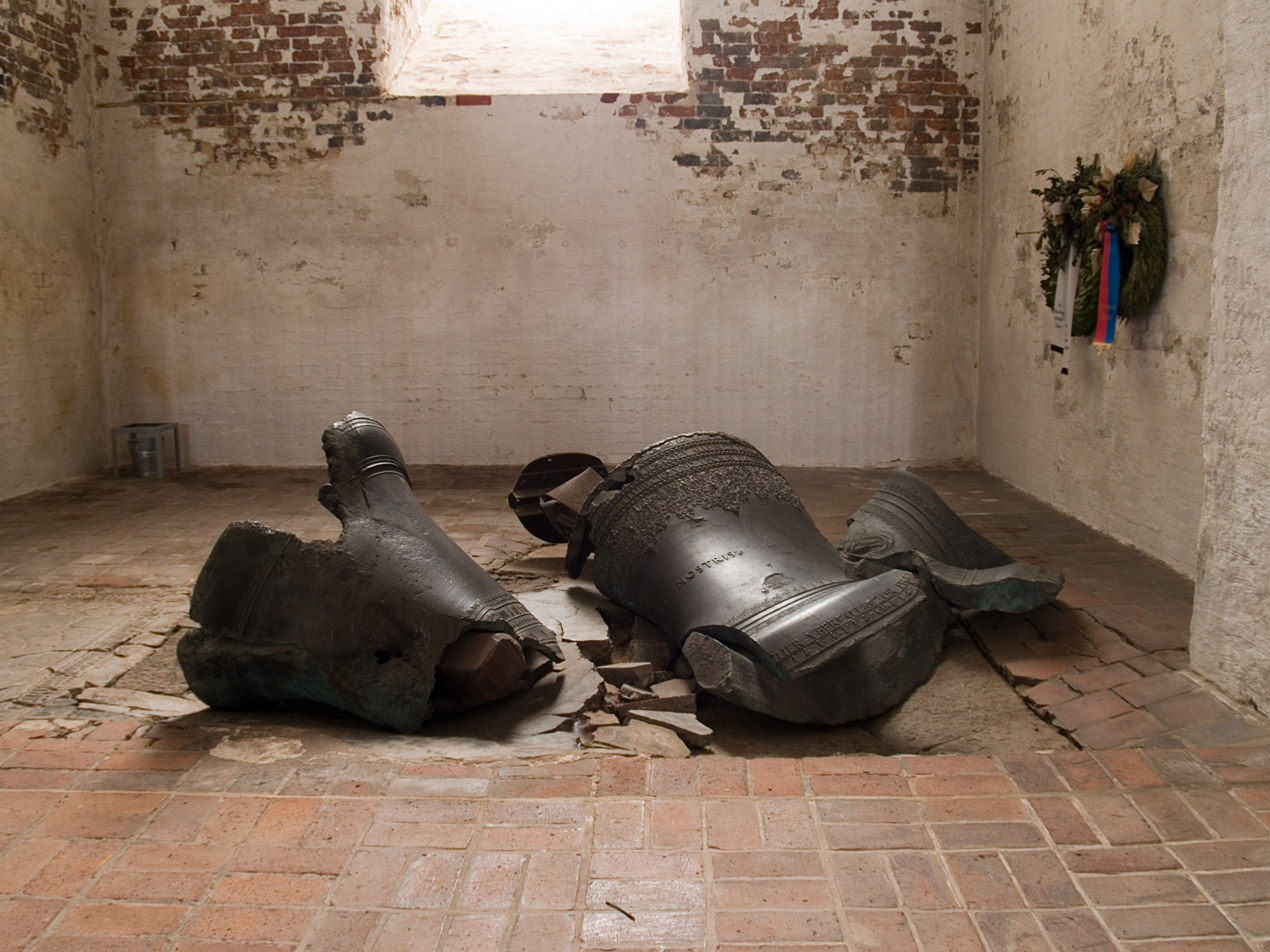
The broken bells which fell to the ground in the fire of 1942 remain on the ground in the South Tower.

The 11 historic bells of the church originally hung in the South Tower in a bell loft 60 metres (200 ft) high. An additional seven bells for sounding the time were made by Heinrich von Kampen in 1508–1510 and installed in the roof spire. During the fire in the air raid of 1942, the bells are reported to have rung again in the upwind before crashing to the ground. The remains of two bells, the oldest bell, the "Sunday bell" by Heinrich von Kampen (2,000 kg (2.0 long tons), diameter 1,710 mm (67 inches), strike tone a^{0}) and the tenor bell by Albert Benningk from 1668 (7,134 kg (7.021 long tons), diameter 2,170 mm (85 inches), strike tone a^{0}F#^{0}), were preserved as a memorial in the former Schinkel Chapel, at the base of the South Tower The "Council and Children's Bell" made in 1650 by Anton Wiese, which used to be rung for the short prayer services before council meetings and for christenings, was given to Strecknitz Mental Home in 1906 and was thus the only one of the historic bells to survive World War II. Today it hangs in the tower of what is now the University of Lübeck hospital.

The set of bells in the North Tower now consists of seven bells. It ranks among the largest and deepest-pitched of its kind in northern Germany. The three baroque bells originate from Danzig churches, (Gratia Dei and Dominicalis from St. John's and Osanna from St. Mary's). After the Second World War, these bells from the "Hamburger bell cemetery" were hung in the tower as temporary replacement bells.

In 1951 the German Chancellor, Konrad Adenauer donated a new bell. In 1985 three additional bells were made, completing the set. They have inscriptions referring to peace and reconciliation.

In 2005, the belfry was renovated. The steel bell frame from the reconstruction was replaced with a wooden one and the bells were hung directly on wooden yokes, so that the bells ring out with more brilliance.

This great peal is easily recognised because of the unusual disposition (intervals between the individual bells); the series of whole tone steps between bells 1–5 results in a distinctive sound with added vibrancy due to the tone of the historic bells.

Number.	Name / Function	Made by	Year made	Weight	Diameter	Nominal	Place of origin
1	Bourdon bell (Pulsglocke)	Friedrich Wilhelm Schilling, Heidelberg	1951	5,817 kilograms (5.725 long tons)	2.10 metres (6.9 ft)	G-flat° +8	–
2	Prayer and Sunday Bell (Bet- und Sonntagsglocke)	Gebr. Bachert, Bad Friedrichshall-Kochendorf	1985	4,668 kilograms (4.594 long tons)	1.93 metres (6.3 ft)	A-flat° +10	–
3	Evening Bell (Abendglocke) or Peace Bell (Friedensglocke)	Bachert Bros., Bad Friedrichshall-Kochendorf	1985	2,994 kilograms (2.947 long tons)	1.71 metres (5.6 ft)	b° +9	–
4	Gratia Dei	Johann Gottfried Anthonÿ, Danzig	1740	2,400 kilograms (2.362 long tons)	1.65 metres (5.4 ft)	c' +5	Danzig, St. Johann
5	Osanna	Benjamin Wittwerck, Danzig	1719	1,740 kilograms (1.713 long tons)	1.44 metres (4.7 ft)	d' +6	St. Mary's Church, Gdańsk
6	Conciliation Bell (Versöhnungsglocke)	Bachert Bros., Bad Friedrichshall-Kochendorf	1985	1,516 kilograms (1.492 long tons)	1.32 metres (4.3 ft)	E-flat' +10	–
7	Dominicalis	Johann Gottfried Anthonÿ, Danzig	1735	850 kilograms (0.837 long tons)	1.11 metres (3.6 ft)	f' +11	Danzig, St. Johann

== See also ==
- List of tallest structures built before the 20th century

== Bibliography ==
=== English sources ===
- Gorra, Michael (2004). The Bells in Their Silence: Travels Through Germany. Princeton University Press. ISBN 0691117659.
- Keats, Jonathan (2013). Forged: Why Fakes are the Great Art of Our Age. OUP USA. ISBN 9780199928354.
- Snyder, Kerala J. (1987). Dieterich Buxtehude: Organist in Lübeck. University of Rochester Press. ISBN 9781580462532.

=== German sources ===
- Grewolls, Antje (1999). Die Kapellen der norddeutschen Kirchen im Mittelalter: Architektur und Funktion [The Chapels of the North German Churches in the Middle Ages: Architecture and Function] (in German). Ludwig. ISBN 9783980548038.
- "Zwei Euro: Die Marienkirche verlangt jetzt Eintritt" [Two Euros: St. Mary's now charges admission]. Hamburger Abendblatt (in German).
- Isenmann, Eberhard (2014). Die deutsche Stadt im Mittelalter 1150–1550: Stadtgestalt, Recht, Verfassung, Stadtregiment, Kirche, Gesellschaft, Wirtschaft [The German Town in the Middle Ages 1150–1550] (in German). Böhlau-Verlag. ISBN 9783412223588.
- Körs, Anna (2012). Gesellschaftliche Bedeutung Von Kirchenräumen: Eine Raumsoziologische Studie zur Besucherperspektive [Social Significance of Church Spaces: A Spatial-Sociological Study on the Visitor's Perspective] (in German). Verlag für Sozialwissenschaften. ISBN 9783531931692.
- Söring, Helmut (13 May 2002). "Der Meister-Fälscher von Lübeck" [The master forger of Lübeck]. Hamburger Abendblatt (in German).
- Spicha, Reinhold (9 March 2000). "Waren mittelalterliche Bronzetaufbecken auch verkörperte Raummasse?" [Were mediaeval bronze baptismal fonts also physical standards for volume?] (in German).

=== Indirect German sources ===
Citations referring to the following are indirect citations via the German Wikipedia article. The German article cites the following references:

- Bauverein der Marienkirche (1958). "Die Gestaltung des Innenraums der Marienkirche in Lübeck. Anlage zur Wettbewerbsausschreibung" [The interior design of St. Mary's Church, Lübeck. Appenidix on invitation to tender]. In Weimann, Horst (ed.). Jahrbuch des Bauvereins (in German).
- "Notice". Die Christliche Kunst (in German). 1914.
- Corino, Karl, ed. (1996). Universalgeschichte des Fälschens. 33 Fälle, die die Welt bewegten. Von der Antike bis zur Gegenwart (in German). Eichborn. ISBN 9783821813844.
- Gebrannte Grösse: Die Hanse. Macht des Handels (in German). Monumente Publikationen der Deutsche Stiftung Denkmalschutz. 2002. ISBN 3935208138.
- Dittrich, Konrad (1998). 50 Jahre Lübecker Knaben Kantorei an St. Marien [50 years of the Lübeck Boys Choir at St. Mary's] (in German). Lübeck.
- Goll, Klaus Rainer (1993). "Die Glocken von St. Marien: Ein Briefwechsel zwischen Peter Guttkuhn und Günter Grass" [The bells of St. Mary's. An exchange of letters between Peter Guttkuhn and Günter Grass]. Lübecker Autoren und ihre Stadt: zur 850-Jahr-Feier Lübecks (in German). Monumente Schmidt-Römhild. ISBN 9783795032098.
- Goll, Joachim (1962). "Kunstfälscher" [Art forgers]. Deutsche Kunst und Denkmalpflege (in German) (1 ed.). Berlin: E.A.Seemann Verlag Leipzig.
- Grass, Günter (1997). Die Rättin [The Rat] (in German). Göttingen: Steidl. ISBN 3882434929.
- Grundmann, Günther (1955). "Lübeck". Deutsche Kunst und Denkmalpflege (in German). Berlin: Deutscher Kunstverlag München: 81ff.
- Hasse, Max (1983). Die Marienkirche zu Lübeck [Die Marienkirche zu Lübeck] (in German). Deutscher Kunstverlag. ISBN 3422007474.
- Hirschmann, Peter (1955). "'Was soll aus den gefälschten Wandbildern in St. Marien zu Lübeck werden?" [What should be done with the fake murals in St. Mary's Church, Lübeck?]. Deutsche Kunst und Denkmalpflege (in German). Berlin: Deutscher Kunstverlag München: 106ff.
- Jöns, Heike (1996). "Die Lübecker Marienkirche als Hauptbau der kathedralgotischen Backsteinarchitektur im Ostseeraum". Zeitschrift des Vereins für Lübeckische Geschichte und Altertumskunde (in German) (76): 223–254.
- Kraft, Walter (1968). Drei Orgeln in St. Marien zu Lübeck [Three Organs in St. Mary's Church, Lübeck] (in German).
- "Die Orgel in St. Marien zu Lübeck" [The organs at St. Mary' in Lübeck] (in German).
- "Lothar Malskat gestorben" [Lothar Malskat dead]. Michel Rundschau (in German) (7): 538. 1988.
- Museum Folkwang. Exhibitions catalogue of Essen and Berlin: Fälschung und Forschung [Exhibitions catalogue of Essen and Berlin: Forgery and Research] (in German).
- "Lübeck, Deutschland (Schleswig-Holstein) – Sankt Marienkirche, Totentanzorgel" [Lübeck, Germany (Schleswig-Holstein) – St. Mary's Church, Danse Macabre Organ] (in German).
- Roßmann, Ernst (1955). "Naturwissenschaftliche Untersuchung der Wandmalereien im Chorobergaden der Marienkirche zu Lübeck, anlässlich des Lübecker Bilderfälscherprozesses" [Scientific study of the murals in the clerestory of the choir of St. Mary's Church, Lübeck, on the occasion of the Lübeck picture forgery trial]. Deutsche Kunst und Denkmalpflege (in German). Berlin: Deutscher Kunstverlag München: 99ff.
- Scheper, Hinnerk (1955). "Restaurieren und Berufsethos" [Restoration and Professional Ethics]. Deutsche Kunst und Denkmalpflege (in German). Berlin: Deutscher Kunstverlag München: 109ff.
- Thiesen, Tamara (2007). 'Benedikt Dreyer (in German). Kiel. ISBN 9783937719573.
- Wehlte, K. (1955). "Was ging in Lübeck vor?" [What happened in Lübeck?]. Maltechnik (in German) (61) (1 ed.). Berlin: E.A.Seemann Verlag Leipzig: 11ff.
- Wölfel, Dietrich (2004). Die wunderbare Welt der Orgel. Lübeck als Orgelstadt [The Wonderful World of the Organ: Lübeck as an organ town] (in German) (2 ed.). Lübeck: Schmidt-Römhild. ISBN 3795012619.
- Zimmermann, Friedrich (1988). "Der Wiederaufbau der Lübecker Grosskirchen" [The Restoration of the major Lübeck Churches]. Der Wagen (in German): 18–38 (p. 26 f.). ISSN 0933-484X. OCLC 643861057.
