= Antoine Lacroix =

Antoine Lacroix, sometimes given as Antoine Croix, (1756 – June 18, 1806) was a French composer and violinist. According to musicologist Georg Karstädt, "his works were praised by his contemporaries for their brilliant and effective passages for the [violin], their pleasing melodies and their straightforward structures."

== Biography ==
Antoine Lacroix was born in Rambouillers near Nancy, France in 1756. He studied violin and music composition with the maître de chapelle of the Nancy Cathedral, Joseph-Antoine Lorenziti. From 1780 to 1792 he was active as both a composer and violinist in Paris. He achieve a reputation as a violin virtuoso in that city, and his Six Sonates pour piano et violon, op.1 was published in Paris in 1784.

Lacroix left Paris due to the French Revolution in 1792, and made his way to the city of Bremen where he remained through 1794. After this he gave concert tours of Denmark and Germany prior to settling in Lübeck in 1796 where he was employed as a town musician. He also worked briefly as a chamber musician for Frederick William II of Prussia in Berlin before coming to Lübeck. In Lübeck he collaborated with organist Johann Wilhelm Cornelius von Königslöw on a series of private concerts.

In 1799 Lacroix established himself as a vendor of sheet music; selling both his own compositions as well as music composed by others like Joseph Haydn, Ignaz Pleyel, and Johann Rudolf Zumsteeg. Principally a composer for the violin, his compositional output included duos, sonatas, and variations. He also penned some orchestral music, three string quartets, and several waltzes among other dance music. While praised by his contemporaries and by 21st-century music scholars, his works have largely remained un-explored by contemporary performers. However, the violinist Plamena Nikitassova has recorded Lacroix's theme and variation Airs variés pour un violon on her chamber music album Mozart und seine Zeitgenossen (2018, Claves Records).

Antoine Lacroix died on June 18, 1806 in Lübeck.
