= Abendmusik =

Series of music concerts at St. Mary's Church, Lübeck

Abendmusik (German for "evening music", plural Abendmusiken) usually refers to a series of musical concert held in the St. Mary's Church, Lübeck (Marienkirche), Germany, begun in the 17th century and lasting until the early 19th century. Most of the music for these occasions, composed by Franz Tunder, Dieterich Buxtehude, and their successors, has been lost. Modern usage of term may also refer to any concerts in a church.

== History ==
The exact origins are uncertain. C. Ruetz, then cantor and the Marienkirche, wrote a first detailed study in 1752, where he could, based on his own memories, only trace back the practice to that of the organist entertaining business people on Thursdays, before the opening of the stock exchange, a practice which was also present in other trading cities such as Amsterdam or Copenhagen. It is most likely that this began during the tenure of Franz Tunder, who was organist at the Marienkirche from 1641 to 1667: Tunder referred to revenue received from an "Abendspiel" in a letter dated January 11, 1646. Encouraged by these fees, he later came to add further instrumental and vocal soloists, but it is under his successor Dieterich Buxtehude (organist at Lübeck from 1668 until 1707), that these concerts came to prominence.

Already in 1669, Buxtehude had significantly expanded the required forces to include orchestra and chorus, necessitating the construction of additional galleries to have enough space for the about 40 performers. The first occurrence of the term dates from 1673, when Buxtehude (in his dual function as administrator of the church and organist) noted the purchase of trumpets "zur Zier der Abendt Music" ("for the ornamentation of the Abendt Music"). Begun as programmes of assorted choral works, the Abendmusiken first included a dramatic oratorio in 1678, when Buxtehude programmed Die Hochzeit des Lamms, a two-part work combining biblical text with chorales and assorted poetry, likely performed on two successive Sundays. At the latest by 1684, Buxtehude had also moved the performances to the evenings of the two final Sundays of Trinity and the second, third and fourth Sundays of Advent. Two oratorios, Himmlische Seelenlust auf Erden and Das Allerschröcklichste und Allererfreulichste, both in five parts, with the first one described as being in the opera style, with arias and ritornellos, were advertised for publication that year. The division in five parts would remain standard practice for the remainder of the Abendmusiken.

Financed by the local business community, the performances offered free admission, although donors were rewarded with better seating and printed librettos. Disorderly conduct was a frequent problem, requiring the intervention of municipal guards to maintain order. Starting in 1752, Johann Kunzen began charging admission to dress-rehearsals on Fridays, held in the hall of the stock exchange. With time, these became the more prestigious ones. Sunday performances were abolished in 1800, and the series was finally halted in 1810 as a result of the Napoleonic Wars.

In modern times, the term has been used as a generic term to refer to concerts in a church.

== Extant compositions ==
Much of the Abendmusiken have not survived to the 21st century. The only two examples remaining which were performed for these occasions with certitude are Adolf Kunzen's Moses in seinem Eifer gegen die Abgötterey in den Wüsten and Absalon. Wacht! Euch zum Streit, published in 1939 as a work by Buxtehude, is of dubious authenticity and is of anonymous origin in manuscripts. Further works by Kunzen and von Königslöw were lost during World War II.

== Sources ==
- Apel, Willi, ed. The Harvard Dictionary of Music, 2nd ed. Cambridge, Massachusetts: Harvard UP, 1972.
- Snyder, Kerala J., "Abendmusik", Grove Music Online, 2001.
- Snyder, Kerala J., "Abendmusik", in Lütteken, Laurenz (ed.), Die Musik in Geschichte und Gegenwart, Kassel/Stuttgart/New York, 1994 [online ed. 2016]. (in German)
