= Johann Christian Schieferdecker =

Johann Christian Schieferdecker (or Schiefferdecker; 10 November 1679 – 3 April 1732) was a German Baroque composer.

Schieferdecker was born in Teuchern. He became harpsichord player at the Hamburg Opera, then succeeded Dieterich Buxtehude as organist of the Marienkirche in Lübeck. He died in Lübeck.

== Works, editions and recordings ==
- XII musicalische Concerte, Hamburg 1713

Recordings

- Geistliche Konzerte: Triumph, Triumph, Belial ist nun erleget; Auf, auf, mein Herz, Sinn und Gemüte; In te Domine speravi; Weicht, ihr schwarzen Trauerwolken. Klaus Mertens, Hamburger Ratsmusik, Simone Eckert. Carus-Verlag, 2012, ASIN B007WA0VTQ
- Musicalische Concerte (Hamburg 1713). Elbipolis Barockorchester Hamburg, Challenge Records CC72531, 2011, UPC/EAN 608917253122, ASIN B0062EOZ3Q
