= Paul Behrens (clockmaker) =

German clockmaker

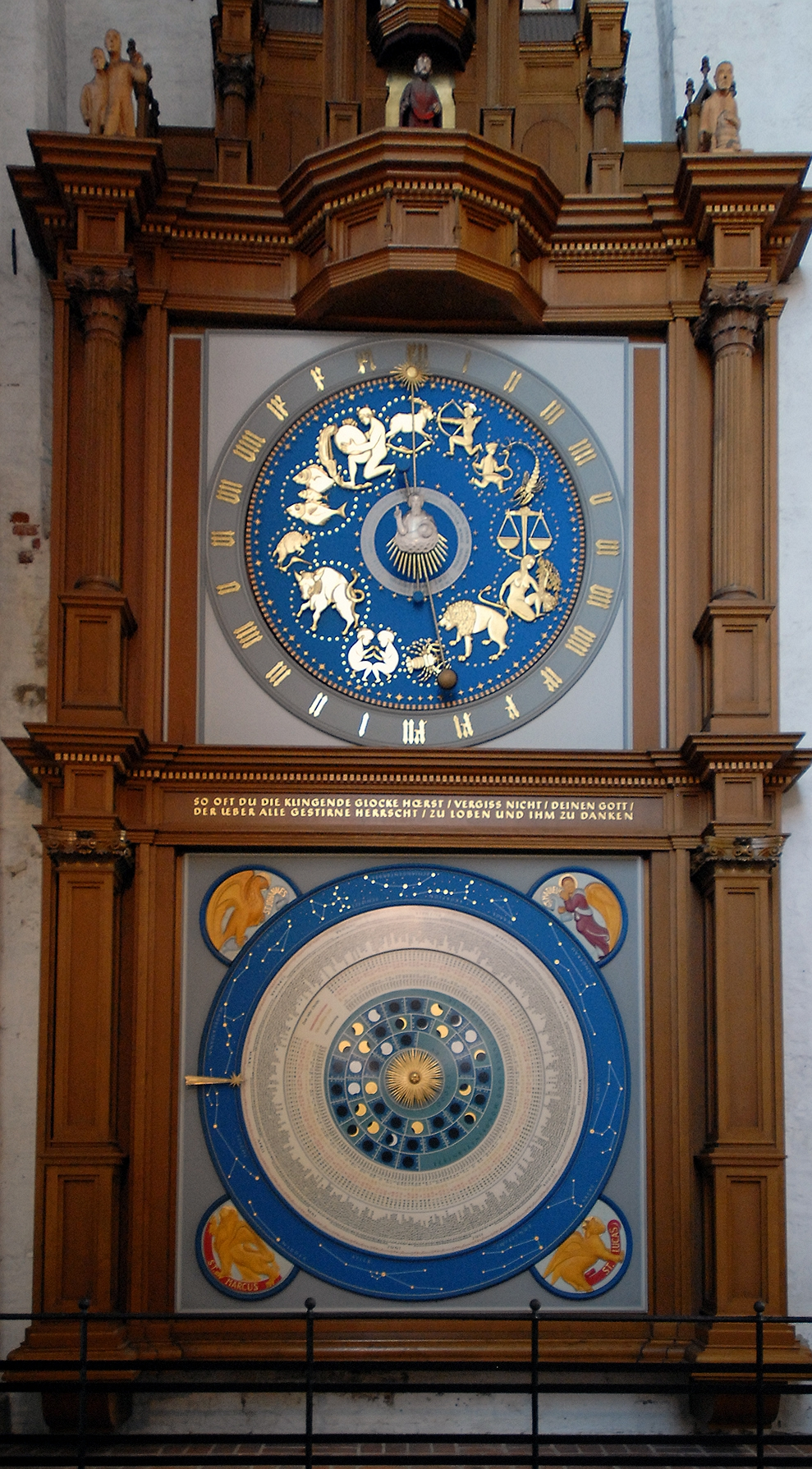
Behrens' astronomical clock at St Mary's Church in Lübeck

Paul Behrens (1893–1984) was a clockmaker in Lübeck in northern Germany.

== Life ==
Behrens was the son of Paul Behrens sr, who himself had been a clockmaker in Lübeck. Paul Behrens jr took over the management of the family company ("Uhrenhaus Behrens") in 1936 and remained at its helm until 1975.

Behrens is best known for his reconstruction of the peal of bells of St. Mary's Church in Lübeck and his creation of the new Astronomical Clock in the same church (the original peal of bells and Astronomical Clock had been destroyed in the Bombing of Lübeck in World War II). He also ensured the financing of these initiatives and was able to give the completed clock to the church in 1967.

In the same year, the city of Lübeck awarded Paul Behrens the Ehrenplakette of the Senate, one of the honours in the gift of the Senate of Lübeck.
