= Franz Tunder =

German composer and organist

Franz Tunder (1614 – November 5, 1667) was a German composer and organist of the early to middle Baroque era. He was an important link between the early German Baroque style which was based on Venetian models, and the later Baroque style which culminated in the music of J.S. Bach; in addition he was formative in the development of the chorale cantata.

== Life ==
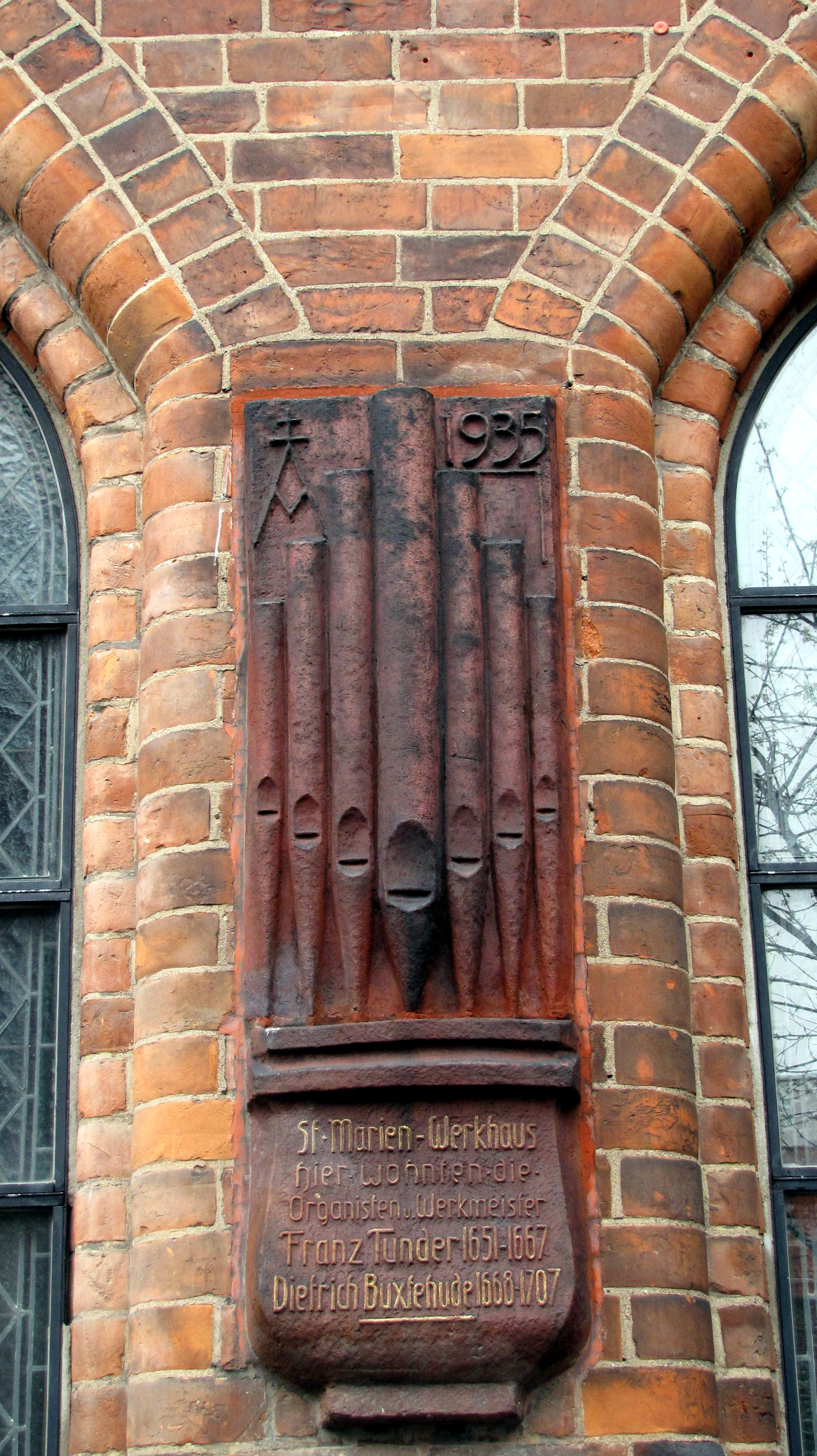
Terracotta plaque at the Marienwerkhaus for organists Franz Tunder and Dietrich Buxtehude, 1935

According to recent research, Tunder was born in Lübeck, not in Bannesdorf or Burg on the island of Fehmarn as was believed by earlier scholars. Little is known about his early life other than that his talent was sufficient to allow him to be appointed as court organist to Frederick III, Duke of Holstein-Gottorp in Gottorf at the age of 18. A few years earlier, he had gone to Italy in the company of Johann Heckelauer, and it is likely that he studied with Girolamo Frescobaldi while he was in Florence. (Johann Mattheson asserted that he did, but this has been disputed by later scholars).

Between 1632 and 1641, Tunder worked in Gottorf as "Hoforganist". In 1641 he was appointed as the main organist at Lübeck's main church, the Marienkirche, succeeding Peter Hasse. In 1647 he became administrator and treasurer there also. He held that post for the rest of his life. His successor was Dieterich Buxtehude. Buxtehude married Tunder's daughter, Anna Margarethe, in 1668.

He began the tradition of "Abendmusiken", a long series of free concerts in the Marienkirche, the most elaborate of which were before Christmas time. The earliest of these concerts occurred in 1646. The concerts seem to have originated as organ performances specifically for the businessmen who congregated at the weekly opening of the town's stock exchange. These concerts were to continue through the 17th and 18th centuries; they were distinguished from other concerts by having free admission (for they took place in a church), and by being financed by the business community.

== Music ==
Along with Heinrich Scheidemann and Matthias Weckmann, Tunder was one of the most important members of the North German organ school; however, few of his works are preserved.

His surviving output suggests a marked preference for the chorale fantasia style, though he is also known for chorale versets, such as his setting of Jesus Christus unser Heiland, notable in particular for the opening pedal flourish (probably the earliest surviving example of an opening pedal solo in an organ work), a technique that was to be more fully exploited by Dietrich Buxtehude.
