= Siegfried Pank =

German cellist and viol player

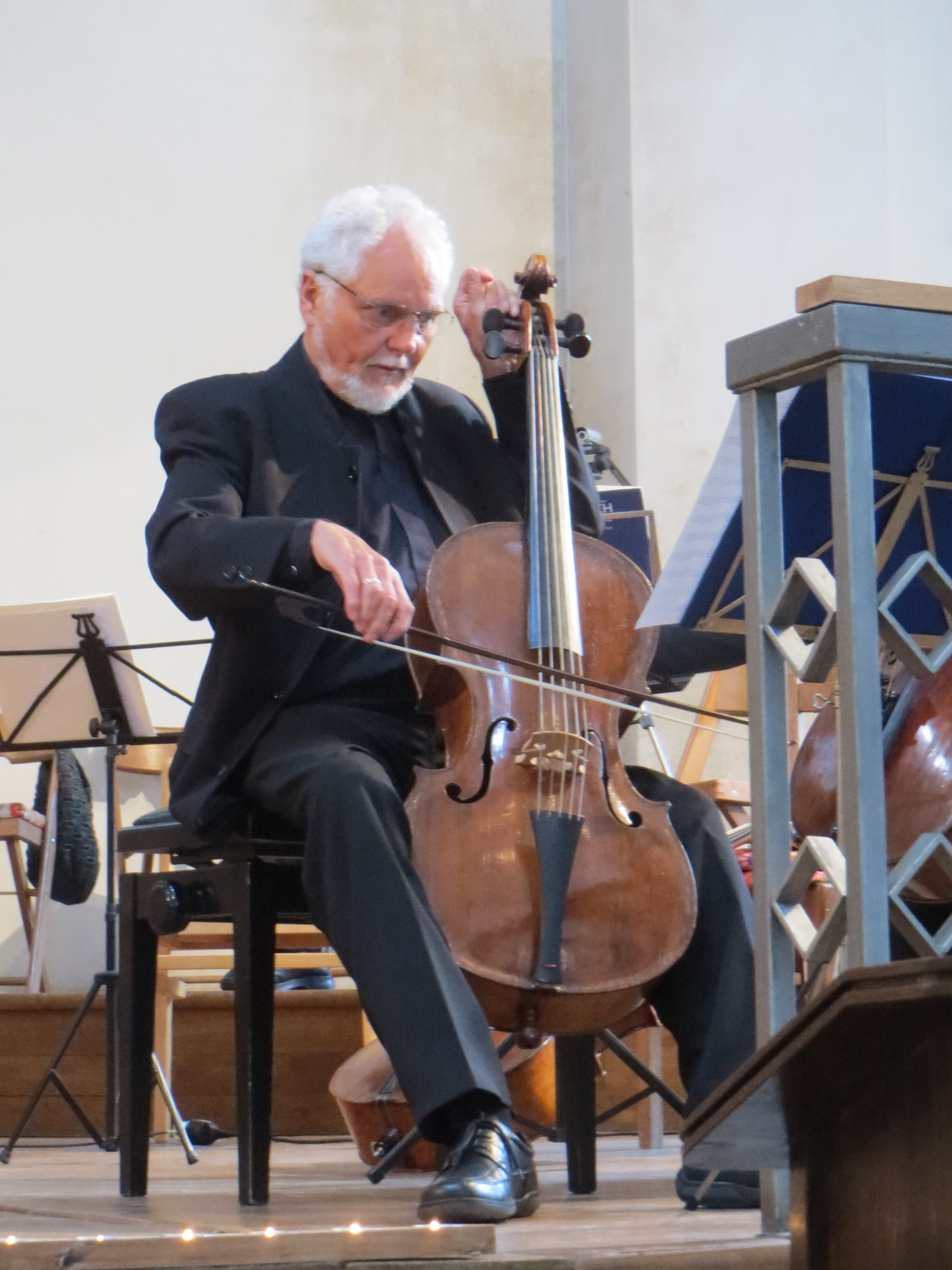
- Siegfried Pank in 2014, playing a violoncello piccolo
- Born: 24 March 1936 (age 89); Salzwedel, Province of Saxony, Prussia, Germany
- Education: Landesschule Pforta; Thomanerchor; Musikhochschule Leipzig
- Occupations: Cellist; Viol player; Academic teacher; Music association director
- Organizations: Gewandhausorchester; Neues Bachisches Collegium Musicum; Musikhochschule Leipzig; International Telemann Association
- Awards: Magdeburg Telemann Prize
- Website: www.siegfriedpank.de

Siegfried Pank (born 24 March 1936) is a German cellist and viol player. He was a member of the Gewandhausorchester in Leipzig from 1962 to 1980, and toured with the Neues Bachisches Collegium Musicum. He turned to playing the viol in historically informed performance, and lectured cello and viol at the Musikhochschule Leipzig from 1984, as professor from 1988 to 2001. He was a co-founder of the International Telemann Association in 1991, serving as its president from 2012.

== Life ==
Plank was born in Salzwedel, Saxony-Anhalt. His father was a bridge-building engineer and amateur musician, and his great-grandfather was the Leipzig superintendent Oskar Pank. He grew up in Danzig, Pomerania. In 1944, he was brought to Borna, where he received piano and cello lessons. From 1948 to 1952, he attended the Landesschule Pforta, and afterwards until 1954 at the Thomasschule zu Leipzig where he was a member of the Thomanerchor conducted by Günther Ramin.

Pank studied cello at the Musikhochschule Leipzig with August Eichhorn until 1959. He received his first employment as solo cellist at the Carl-Maria-von-Weber-Theater in Bernburg. From 1960, he was first solo cellist in the new orchestra of the Musikalische Komödie in Leipzig. He became a member of the Gewandhausorchester in 1962, serving as deputy solo cellist from 1973. He remained active as a soloist and chamber musician. He toured with the Neues Bachisches Collegium Musicum. Wieland Kuijken and Jordi Savall pointed him at playing the viol in historically informed performance.

In 1980, Pank left the orchestra and took up a teaching position at the Musikhochschule, as a lecturer from 1984, and as professor of cello and viol from 1988. In 1991, he founded an Early music (Alte Musik) department there. He became emeritus in 2001, but still lectured until 2006. He has held seminars and master classes. He has published about performance practice and interpretation of music of the 17th and 18th centuries. He is also a member of the jury at the Deutscher Musikrat as well as at several international competitions, such as the International Johann Sebastian Bach Competition in Leipzig, the Bach-Abel Competition in Köthen and the Magdeburger Telemann-Festtage. He was a co-founder of the International Telemann Association in 1991, and became its president in 2012.

Pank has performed in chamber music, such as in the Baroque Trio Schwarz/Pank/Becker-Foss (with singer Gotthold Schwarz and continuo player Hans Christoph Becker-Foss), with the Leipziger Concert and with the Sächsisches Vocalensemble.

Pank lives in Markkleeberg near Leipzig. His son Sebastian Pank is also a musician and the founder and owner of the record label Raumklang at Schloss Goseck, which specialises in Early music.

== Awards ==
On 10 September 2008, Pank received the Brandenburg Bach Society's Honorary Prize during a concert at the Bachtage Potsdam, in honour of his artistic, musicological and pedagogical services to Bach and for his commitment to the festival.

In recognition of the distribution of Telemann's works, Pank received the Magdeburg Telemann Prize in 2012.

On 7 October 2018, Pank was awarded the Order of Merit of Saxony-Anhalt by the minister-president, Reiner Haseloff, at the opening of the 7th Bach-Abel Competition in the Bachsaal of Schloss Köthen.
