= Telemann Prize =

German music prize

The Telemann Prize is an annual classical music award for special achievements in interpretation, research and cultivation of the life and work of Georg Philipp Telemann.

Since 1987, the city of Magdeburg has awarded the prize every year in March at the time of Telemann's birthday (14 March). Prize winners can be artists, scientists, music teachers, ensembles, institutions or laymen.

The prize consists of a bronze plaque designed by the Berlin sculptor Wilfried Fitzenreiter and is endowed with 2,500 euros.

== Recipients ==
- 1987: Walther Siegmund-Schultze – musicologist
- 1988: Ludwig Güttler – trumpeter
- 1989: Willi Maertens – musicologist and music educator
- 1990: Burkhard Glaetzner – oboist
- 1991: Günter Fleischhauer – musicologist
- 1992: Erich Valentin – musicologist
- 1993: Werner Menke – musicologist
- 1994: Peter Schreier – singer and conductor
- 1995: Martin Ruhnke – musicologist
- 1996: Cappella Coloniensis – orchestra
- 1997: Vladimir Ossipowitsch Rabey – musicologist and music educator
- 1998: Hermann Max – church musician
- 1999: Claus Oefner – musicologist
- 2000: Michael Schneider – conductor and flutist
- 2001: Muzeum Zamkowe w Pszczynie (State Castle Museum in Pszczyna)
- 2002: Reinhard Goebel – violinist and conductor
- 2003: Wolf Hobohm – musicologist
- 2004: Nikolaus Harnoncourt – conductor, cellist and music writer
- 2005: András Székely – musicologist
- 2006: Akademie für Alte Musik Berlin – orchestra
- 2007: Bärenreiter-Verlag – music publisher
- 2008: René Jacobs – conductor and countertenor
- 2009: Carus-Verlag – music publisher
- 2010: Simon Standage – violinist and conductor
- 2011: Working group "Georg Philipp Telemann" Magdeburg – organiser of the Magdeburger Telemann-Festtage
- 2012: Siegfried Pank – cellist, viol player and musicologist
- 2013: Helmut Winschermann – oboist and conductor
- 2014: Paul Dombrecht – oboist and conductor
- 2015: Stiftung Amadeus – music publisher
- 2016: Klaus Mertens – bass-baritone
- 2017: Burkhard Schmilgun – producer and director of the Classic Produktion Osnabrück – music label
- 2018: Gotthold Schwarz – Thomaskantor and bass-baritone
- 2019: Klaus Hofmann – musicologist
- 2020: Dorothee Oberlinger – recorder player and conductor
- 2021: Elizabeth Wallfisch – violinist
- 2022: Steven D. Zohn – musicologist and performer
- 2023: Ian Payne – musicologist
- 2024: Barthold Kuijken – flutist
- 2025: Wolfgang Hirschmann – musicologist
- 2026: Michael Alexander Willens – conductor
