= Alectorius =

Alectorius can refer to:

- Johannes Galliculus, a medieval German music theorist and composer
- Lapis alectorius, an occult stone
