= Alectoria =

Alectoria may refer to:

- Alectoria (fungus), a genus of lichenized fungi
- Alectoria (insect), a monotypic genus of bush crickets or katydids in the subfamily Phaneropterinae
- Alectoria, a genus of birds in the family Phasianidae; synonym of Alectoris
- Alectoria (stone), a purportedly magic crystal, found in the gizzards of roosters
