= Johannes Gallicus =

Johannes Gallicus can refer to:

- Johannes de Garlandia (music theorist) (fl. c.1270–1320), French music theorist
- Johannes Gallicus (humanist) (c.1415-1473), French humanist

== See also ==
- Johannes Galliculus (c. 1490–c. 1550), French composer
