= Forum Thomanum =

German music educational campus

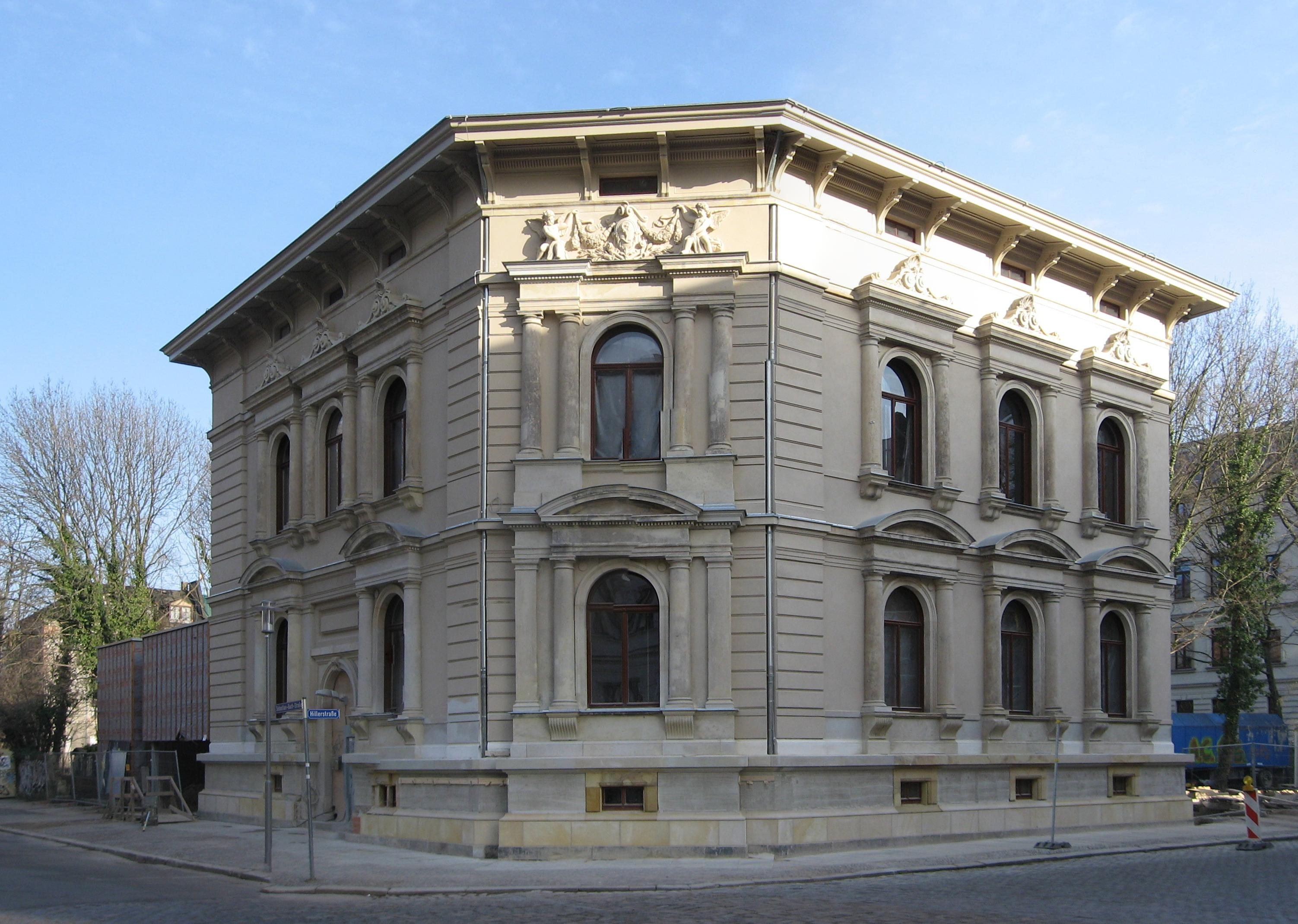
- Villa Thomana, part of the campus
- Motto: glauben singen lernen
- Motto in English: believing singing learning
- Type: Municipal music educational campus around; Thomaskirche; Thomanerchor; Thomasschule
- Established: 2002; 24 years ago
- Founders: Georg Christoph Biller a.o.
- Students: 1,200
- Location: Leipzig, Saxony, Germany; 51°20′13″N 12°21′41″E
- Website: www.forum-thomanum.de

The Forum Thomanum (styled forum thomanum) is a music educational campus developed from 2002 in Leipzig, Saxony, Germany, as the new home of the Thomanerchor which was founded in 1212. It was conceived in 2002 by Georg Christoph Biller, then Thomaskantor, and others, to provide an internationally oriented innovative campus for a future of the traditional choir which was defined until then by Thomaskirche and Thomasschule.

The campus was inaugurated in 2012, where up to 1,200 boys and young men are given cultural education based on a religious foundation, social competence and democratic standing.

== History ==
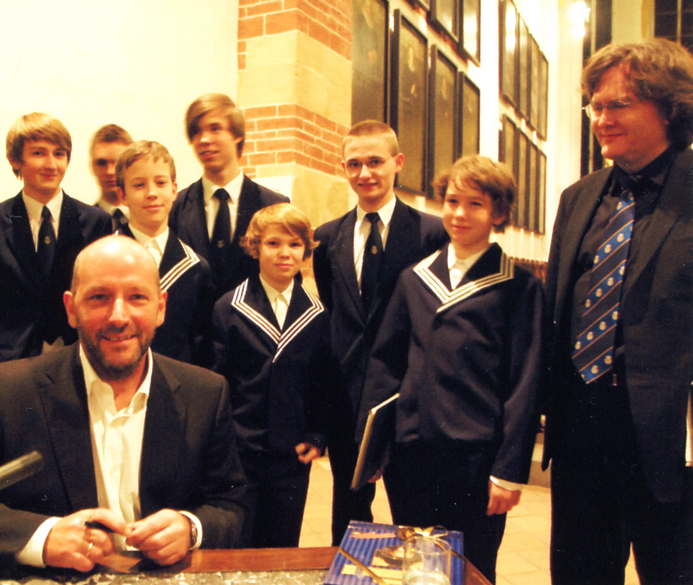
Biller (right) as conductor of the Thomanerchor with Robert Schneider at a reading at the Thomaskirche in 2008

In 2002, Georg Christoph Biller, then Thomaskantor, and others conceived the plan to broaden the education of the Thomanerchor which was founded in 1212 and conducted by Johann Sebastian Bach from 1723. The boys were until then educated at the Thomasschule with boarding facility, to perform mainly in the Thomaskirche. Besides Biller, Stefan Altner, Roland Weise and Christian Wolff were instrumental in planning Forum Thomanum as a campus for music education (musischer Bildungscampus), an internationally oriented institution to care for the future of the traditional choir investing in education. Historic buildings were to be modernised and expanded, and new buildings added. An association to promote the project was founded in 2002. Members included Biller, Klaus Lindner, Burkhard Jung (then mayor of Leipzig) and Christoph Michael Haufe.

From the 2000s, the project was realised in steps. In 2003, the Leipzig architectural firm Weis & Volkmann was included in the planning. The first by-law was drawn by the jurist Frieder Schäuble, and a concept for new institutions was presented, for a bilingual day care centre, a primary school and a middle school, a music academy, and the Lutherkirche as a building with several functions. They were to be connected to the existing Thomasalumnat and sports facilities. A project of the city of Leipzig, it has been recognised as innovative and unique in Germany. The city estimated the total investment as Euro 30 million.

The campus was inaugurated in 2012, for the 800th anniversary of the Thomanerchor. Its motto is "glauben singen lernen" (believing singing learning). Up to 1,200 boys and young men are taught with the goal to raise culturally educated young people with a religious foundation, social competence and democratic standing ("mehr kulturell gebildete, religiös gebundene, sozial kompetente, demokratisch gesinnte Menschen") for a better society.

The idea of a campus became a model for similar projects of city development (Stadtentwicklung) in Bremen and Nürnberg which were supported by the Bundesministerium für Verkehr, Bau und Stadtentwicklung from 2007 to 2015.

In 2012, the Thomanerchor was awarded a special prize of the Echo Klassik for its international education campus.

== Campus ==
- Day care center
- Elementary school and after-school care
- Middle school
- St. Thomas School
- Thomasalumnat, boarding school
- Villa thomana
- Academia
- Lutherkirche, Leipzig at the edge of Johannapark

The former church grounds of the Anglican All Saints' Church destroyed in World War II are integrated into the educational campus.
