= Lars Woldt =

German operatic bass

Lars Woldt (born 15 December 1972) is a German operatic bass and voice teacher.

== Life ==
Born in Herford, Woldt studied composition with Giselher Klebe as well as singing with Martin Christian Vogel and Thomas Quasthoff at the Hochschule für Musik Detmold. Further studies led him to Kammersänger Walter Berry, Franz Crass and to Edith Lienbacher.

After a first engagement at the Landestheater Detmold, artistic director Brigitte Fassbaender engaged him in 2000 at the Tyrolean State Theatre, where he was a member of the ensemble until 2003. Since the 2004/2005 season, he has been a member of the ensemble at the Volksoper Wien. His interpretation of Kaspar in Der Freischütz impressed audiences and critics alike. Guest appearances have taken him among others to the Hamburg State Opera, the opera houses of Copenhagen, Graz and Gothenburg, the Staatstheater Braunschweig and the Linz State Theatre.

His repertoire includes parts of the feature bass like Figaro, Baron Ochs, van Bett, Kezal, Falstaff, Plumkett, Don Magnifico and Zsupán - but also serious bass parts by Mozart, Beethoven and Richard Wagner, Tchaikovsky and Puccini (such as Sarastro, Rocco, Fasolt, King Marke, Gremin, Timur) and also the part of Salieri in Rimsky-Korsakov's Mozart and Salieri.

A main focus of his activity is 20th century music with roles such as Bottom in A Midsummer Night's Dream (Benjamin Britten), Director Hummel in Die Gespenstersonate (Aribert Reiman) and Ratefreund in Die Vögel (Walter Braunfels). Several composers have dedicated works to him, including Giselher Klebe, whose Michelangelo Songs world premiered in 2001.

His concert repertoire includes Monteverdi's Vespro della Beata Vergine, J. S. Bach's St. Matthew Passion as well as the St. John Passion, the Christmas Oratorio and the B Minor Mass, Handel's Messiah, Haydn's The Creation and The Seasons, Mozart's Requiem, Beethoven's Symphony No. 9 and his Missa solemnis, Mendelssohn's Paulus and Elijah, Verdi's Messa da Requiem, Brahm's Ein deutsches Requiem, Dvořák's Stabat Mater, Puccini's Messa di gloria and Shostakovich's Michelangelo Suite.

Among others, he has performed with the WDR Symphony Orchestra Cologne, the NDR Radiophilharmonie, the Stuttgart Radio Symphony Orchestra, the Bamberg Symphony Orchestra, the Stuttgarter Philharmoniker, the Gürzenich Orchestra Cologne, the Munich Radio Orchestra, the Deutsche Kammerphilharmonie Bremen, the Schleswig-Holstein Musik Festival, the Berliner Philharmonie, the Kölner Philharmonie, the Wiener Musikverein, the Wiener Konzerthaus, the Leipzig Gewandhaus and the Auditorio Nacional de Música in Madrid.

Woldt has participated in several radio and CD recordings, including the recording of Richard Strauss' Elektra conducted by Semyon Bychkov) and Mendelssohn's Die erste Walpurgisnacht conducted by Helmuth Rilling.

In November 2007, he made his debut as Mesner in Tosca at the Vienna State Opera. Since the 2010/2011 season, he has been a member of the ensemble of the State Opera, where he has successfully appeared among others as Baron Ochs in Der Rosenkavalier, Waldner in Arabella, Rocco in Fidelio and Biterolf in Tannhäuser.

In 2014, he sang, to high acclaim, Baron Ochs in der Rosenkavalier at the Glyndebourne Festival. In 2014 and 2015, engagements took him to the Opera de Paris, the Vienna State Opera, the Zurich Opera House, the Musikverein Graz, the Düsseldorf Opera and the Theater an der Wien.

Since October 2011, Woldt has been professor of singing at the Hochschule für Musik Detmold, and since winter semester 2016/17, he has been teaching at the Hochschule für Musik und Theater München.

== Awards ==
In 1997, he received a scholarship from the International Association of Wagner Societies, and in 2004 he was awarded the Eberhard Waechter Medal as a sponsorship prize from the Vienna State Opera. For the best male lead role in Der Wildschütz at the Volksoper Wien as Baculus he received the Austrian Music Theatre Award 2014.
