= Andreas Reize =

Swiss organist and conductor, born 1975

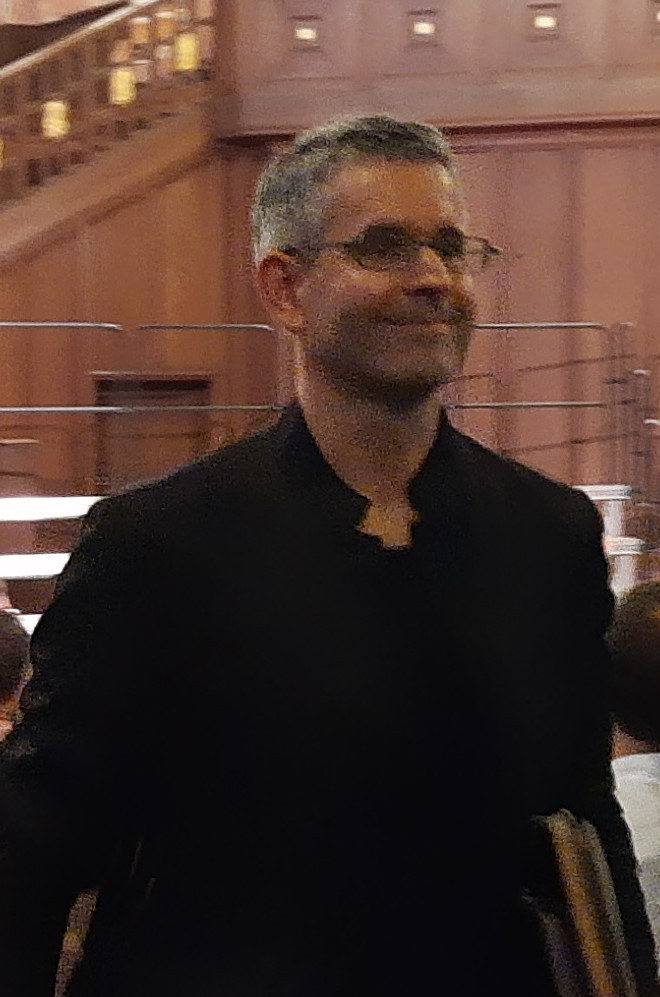
- Reize leaving after a concert of the Thomanerchor at Lutherkirche, Wiesbaden
- Born: 19 May 1975 (age 50); Solothurn, Switzerland
- Occupations: Organist; Conductor; Thomaskantor
- Organizations: Cantus Firmus; Singknaben der St. Ursenkathedrale Solothurn; Zürcher Bach Chor; Thomanerchor
- Website: andreasreize.com

Andreas Reize (born 19 May 1975) is a Swiss organist and conductor, with a focus on opera and choral conducting. He was appointed Thomaskantor on 11 September 2021, becoming the 18th director of music to take charge of the world famous Thomanerchor at Leipzig in succession to Johann Sebastian Bach.

== Career ==
Reize was born and grew up in Solothurn, where he passed the Matura in 1996. He was a long-term member of the Singknaben der St. Ursenkathedrale Solothurn. He studied church music at the Hochschule der Künste Bern and the Musikhochschule Zürich, achieving also master's degrees in piano pedagogy and concert organ playing. He studied organ and harpsichord at the Schola Cantorum Basiliensis from 1999 to 2002, followed by studies of orchestral conducting at the Musikhochschule Luzern. He took post-graduate studies in conducting at Universität für Musik und darstellende Kunst Graz and with Johannes Prinz in Vienna, completed in 2006 with distinction. Reize attended master classes with Anders Eby, Colin Davis, Bernard Haitink and Ralf Weikert, among others, and was especially influenced in meetings with Nikolaus Harnoncourt at the Opernhaus Zürich and the Styriarte festival.

Reize founded the group Cantus Firmus Vokalensemble und Consort in 2001, and the chamber choir Cantus Firmus Kammerchor in 2006. He became musical director of the Oper Schloss Waldegg in 2006, where his ensembles performed and recorded Rousseau's Le Devin du Village and Handel's Apollo e Dafne. They performed a series of Monteverdi's operas, L'Orfeo in 2017, Il ritorno d'Ulisse in Patria in 2019, and L'incoronazione di Poppea in 2021. He conducted at Theater Biel-Solothurn Rameau's Zaïs and Purcells's Dido and Aeneas.

Reize conducted as a guest at the Nationaltheater Mannheim, the Tonhalle-Orchester Zürich and the Schweizer Kammerchor. In 2007, he was a lecturer at the Swiss Opernstudio. With cantus firmus, he appeared at the Internationale Sommerfestspiele für Alte Musik in Innsbruck, the Bachwochen in Amsoldingen, and in concerts of the Bieler Sinfonieorchester.

Reize was artistic director of the Singknaben der St. Ursenkathedrale Solothurn from 2007 to 2021. He expanded their repertoire by contemporary music, such as choreographed pop songs for SKJF, a festival of Swiss children's choirs and youth choirs. The choir performed in services and concerts including an annual performance of Bach's Christmas Oratorio, which was also performed at the Kulturfabrik Kofmehl in 2014 and 2015. The choir participated at the Europäisches Jugendchor Festival Basel in 2016. They recorded two CDs, Now sleeps the crimson petal in 2016, and Sing a cappella! in 2018.

From 2011 to 2021, Reize also conducted the Gabrielichor in Bern, an ensemble specialised in music for several choirs, including the Marienvesper settings by Rovetta and Rosenmüller, and Monteverdi's Vespers. He was director of the Zürcher Bach Chor from 2011 to 2021, conducting a repertoire from Renaissance to contemporary, in both orchestral concerts as especially a cappella. The produced a partly staged performance of Purcell's King Arthur, the Swiss first performance of Bach's St John Passion in the instrumentation by Robert Schumann and Der Messias, Mozart's arrangement of Handel's Messiah, among others. They performed at the Augustinerkirche in Erfurt, the Meißen Cathedral and the Dresden Frauenkirche.

=== Thomaskantor ===
On 18 December 2020, Reize was designated by the Leipzig city council as Thomaskantor, the 18th in the position after Johann Sebastian Bach, as the first Swiss and the first Catholic since the Reformation. His predecessor Gotthold Schwarz retired end of June 2021. Reize took office on 11 September 2021, performing in the afternoon Bach's cantata Was Gott tut, das ist wohlgetan, BWV 99, with the Thomanerchor and the Gewandhausorchester in the Motette series. Due to the COVID-19 pandemic, the traditional performance of Bach's Christmas Oratorio was cancelled in 2021, and most boys lived at home instead of the campus. Weekly cantata services were held with groups of 8 or 9 boys. A tendency to smaller groups, also preferred by considerations of historically informed performance, was already supported by Reize's predecessors Biller and Schwarz.

Reize converted to the Lutheran Church, to be a member of the congregation. After a break of two years due to the COVID-19 pandemic, he resumed the traditional summer tour in 2022 with a program titled Salmo!, after the opening with Aguiar's Salmo 150. The tour took the boys to places in Thuringia and to the Lutherkirche in Wiesbaden in a concert of the Rheingau Musik Festival.

== Awards ==
- 1996: Förderpreis of Regiobank Solothurn
- 2004 and 2005: Study prize in orchestral conducting of the Sonart and the Kiefer Hablitzel foundation
- 2009: Music prize of Canton of Solothurn
- 2009: Preis pro Wartenfels for cultural merits in the Olten region as conductor of the Buchsgau chamber choir
- 2011: Anerkennungspreis of the culture foundation Kurt und Barbara Alten
- 2017: Music prize of Canton of Solothurn, with the Singknaben of the Solothurn Cathedral

== Recordings ==
- Rousseau: Le Devin du Village, Cantus Firmus, cpo 2007/DRS 2 OCLC 1183772811
- Handel: Apollo e Dafne and orchestral works, Cantus Firmus, cpo 2011/Radio DRS 2 OCLC 937026982
- Now Sleeps the Crimson Petal, songs and motets for Advent and Christmas, Singknaben der St. Ursenkathedrale Solothurn, Rondeau Production, Leipzig 2016 OCLC 1104802517
- Sing a cappella, Singknaben der St. Ursenkathedrale Solothurn, Rondeau Production, Leipzig 2018 OCLC 1089290362
