= Günter Fleischhauer =

German musicologist (1928–2002)

Günter Fleischhauer (8 July 1928 – 12 February 2002) was a German musicologist.

== Life ==
Born in Magdeburg, Fleischhauer attended the Integrierte Gesamtschule Willy Brandt Magdeburg. From 1947 to 1952, he studied classical philology with Erich Reitzenstein, music education with Fritz Reuter and musicology with Max Schneider at the Martin-Luther-Universität Halle-Wittenberg. In 1952, he became a research assistant at the Institute for Music Education there. From 1955 to 1958, he held a lectureship in continuo and score playing. In 1960, he was awarded a doctorate with the dissertation Die Musikergenossenschaften im hellenistischrömischen Altertum. Contributions to the Musical Life of the Romans. In 1962, he became a lecturer in historical musicology at the Institute of Musicology. After the University reform, he was demoted to Lector in 1969. In 1979 he submitted the B Dissertation Methodologische Probleme der Musikhistoriographie, dargestellt an zwei ausgewählten Beispielen, die Musikkulturen der Etrusker und der Römer und die Telemann-Forschung. In 1980, he received a lectureship. After his rehabilitation in 1990, he became associate professor and in 1992 full professor of musicology. In 1994/94, he headed the Institute for Musicology. He conducted research on ancient music and baroque music, in particular on Georg Philipp Telemann and Georg Friedrich Handel.

In 1961 he co-initiated the Telemann-Sonntagsmusiken, in 1962, the Magdeburger Telemann-Festtage and in 1974 the scientific workshops on performance practice and interpretation of 17th/18th century music in the Michaelstein Abbey in Blankenburg (Harz Mountains). In 1962, he became a member of the Magdeburg working group "Georg Philipp Telemann" in the Cultural Association of the GDR and section head of musicology in the Halle-Magdeburg district association in the Verband der Komponisten und Musikwissenschaftler der DDR. Fleischauer was a member of the editorial board of the Magdeburger Telemann-Studien, the Telemann-Konferenzberichte, the Michaelsteiner Konferenzberichte and the Michaelsteiner Forschungsbeiträge. From 1972 to 1998, he was a member of the scientific advisory board of the Institute of Performance Practice Michaelstein. From 1991, he was a board member of the international Georg-Friedrich-Händel-Gesellschaft.

Fleischhauer's books and music are kept in the Centre for Telemann-Pflege und -Forschung Magdeburg.

== Awards ==
- 1991: Georg-Philipp-Telemann-Preis der Landeshauptstadt Magdeburg
- 1998: Telemann-Pokal des Telemann-Arbeitskreises

== Publications ==
- Etrurien und Rom (Musikgeschichte in Bildern, volume 2). VEB Deutscher Verlag für Musik, Leipzig 1964, 1978 (2nd edition).
- Annotationen zu Georg Philipp Telemann. Ausgewählte Schriften (Magdeburger Telemann-Studien. 19). Published by Carsten Lange. Olms, Hildesheim among others 2007, ISBN 978-3-487-13399-7.
