= Le devin du village =

Work of Rousseau

- Opera by Jean-Jacques Rousseau
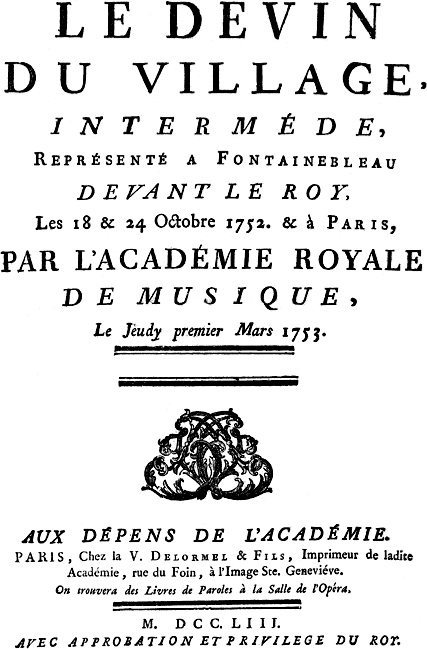
- Librettist: Jean-Jacques Rousseau
- Language: French
- Premiere: 18 October 1752; Château de Fontainebleau

Le devin du village ("The Village Soothsayer") is a one-act French opera (intermède) by Jean-Jacques Rousseau, who also wrote the libretto. It was the first work in the repertory of the Académie Royale de Musique for which the text and music were by the same author.

It was first performed on 18 October 1752 before the royal court at Fontainebleau, and for the public, on 1 March 1753 at the Théâtre du Palais-Royal in Paris. King Louis XV loved the piece so much that he offered Rousseau the great honor of a life pension. Rousseau refused the honor. However, the opera became one of the most popular of its day and brought him both wealth and fame. The opera was also performed at the wedding of the future Louis XVI and Marie Antoinette.

An English translation by Charles Burney, The Cunning Man, was performed in London in 1762. Rousseau's work was the object of a parody in the Singspiel Bastien und Bastienne by the twelve-year-old Mozart.

== Roles ==
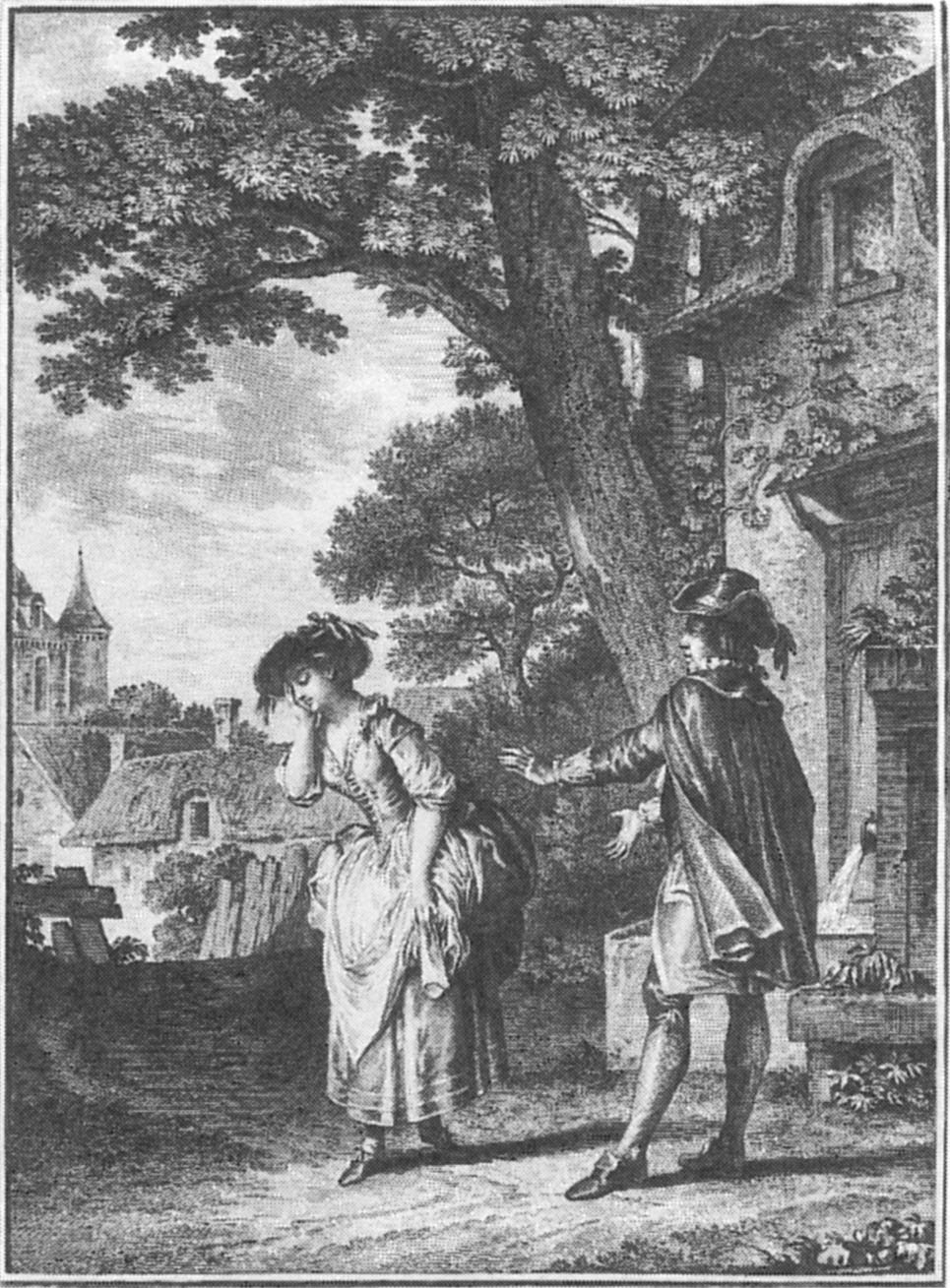
Scene from Le devin du village (Moreau, 1753)

Role	Voice type	Premiere Cast, 18 October 1752 (Conductor:)
Colin	haute-contre	Pierre Jélyotte
Colette	soprano	Marie Fel
The Soothsayer	basse-taille (bass-baritone)	Cuvillier fils

== Synopsis ==
Colin and Colette love one another, yet they suspect each other of being unfaithful — in Colin's case, with the lady of the manor, and in Colette's with a courtier. They each seek the advice and support of the village soothsayer in order to reinforce their love. After a series of deceptions, Colin and Colette reconcile and are happily married.

== Recordings ==
- Janine Micheau as Colette, Nicolai Gedda as Colin, Michel Roux as the soothsayer, Louis de Froment conductor. Recorded April 1956. cpo 999 559-2
- Gabriela Bürgler as Colette, Michael Feyfar as Colin, Dominik Wörner as the soothsayer, Andreas Reize conducting the Cantus Firmus Consort, on period instruments. Recorded live August 2006. cpo 777 260-2
