= Cappella Coloniensis =

German orchestra

Cappella Coloniensis is a German orchestra founded by the West German Radio in Cologne in 1954 for the purpose of introducing historically informed performance of Baroque music to the listening public.

In 1998 the orchestra received the Georg Philipp Telemann Prize from the City of Magdeburg.
