= Steffen Lieberwirth =

German musicologist (born 1952)

Steffen Lieberwirth (born 10 March 1952) is a German musicologist, dramaturge and journalist.

== Life ==
Born in Leipzig, Lieberwirth studied musicology and German literature at the Karl-Marx-University Leipzig and the Martin Luther University of Halle-Wittenberg. Afterwards, he worked for the Konzert- und Gastspieldirektion entertainment agency in Leipzig. In 1979, he became a freelancer in the field of reportage and music history at Radio DDR, Leipzig station. From 1981 he worked as dramaturg, from 1982 to 1989 he was head of the dramaturgy at the Gewandhaus under Kappel Meister. Kurt Masur. During this period (1987), Lieberwirth was awarded a dissertation, supervised by Reinhard Szeskus, submitted to the Scientific Council of the University of Leipzig, Faculty of Cultural, Linguistic and Educational Sciences and prepared by the Art and Cultural Sciences Section of the Faculty of Musicology-Music Education dissertation A "Der Sozialstatus der Musiker in städtischen Diensten vom Beginn ihrer Sesshaftwerdung bis zum 19. Jahrhundert im sächsisch-thüringischen Raum" (The Social Status of Musicians in Municipal Services from the Beginning of their Settlement to the 19th Century in the Saxon-Thuringian Region) earned him a Dr. phil. doctorate. Among the reviewers of the thesis were Bernd Baselt and Siegfried Hoyer. As a consultant, he participated in international symposia in Amsterdam, Bratislava, Leipzig, Linz, Prague and other cities.

After the fall of the Berlin Wall in 1990, Lieberwirth became editor at the Neue Musikzeitung, responsible for the states of Brandenburg, Mecklenburg-Western Pomerania, Saxony, Saxony-Anhalt and Thuringia. In 1990/91 he was head of the department of culture at the Sachsen Radio and built up the programme "Sachsen 3 - Kultur". From 1992, he was music director of MDR Kultur and MDR Figaro. In 2010, he became chief producer of the radio programmes of the MDR.

From 1996 to 2008, Lieberwirth was a member of the advisory board of the Goethe-Institut. In 1996, he founded the radio programme guide Triangel. Das Radio zum Lesen, whose editor-in-chief he was until 2006. He then became project manager of the CD/DVD documentation series "Edition Staatskapelle Dresden" (2005), "Semperoper Edition" (2009) and "Edition Gewandhausorchester" (2011). Since 2005, he has also been responsible for the Mitteldeutscher Rundfunk CD label "MDR Klassik".

== Publications ==
- Die Gewandhaus-Orgeln. Edition Peters, Leipzig among others 1986. (2nd edition 1988: ISBN 3-369-00220-5)
- Gerhard Bosse. Ein Leben am ersten Pult. Ed. Peters, Leipzig among others 1987, ISBN 3-369-00037-7.
- Anton Bruckner und Leipzig. Die Jahre 1884–1902. Akademische Druck- und Verlagsanstalt, Graz 1988, ISBN 3-201-01440-0.
- (ed.): Anton Bruckner. Leben, Werk, Interpretation, Rezeption. Anlässlich der Gewandhaus-Festtage 1987, Leipzig, 9. – 11. Oktober 1987 (Dokumente zur Gewandhausgeschichte. Vol. 7). Ed. Peters, Leipzig 1988, ISBN 3-369-00219-1.
- Bruckner und Leipzig. Vom Werden und Wachsen einer Tradition. Edition Peters, Leipzig 1990, ISBN 3-369-00059-8.
- "Wer eynen Spielmann zu Tode schlaegt…". Ein mittelalterliches Zeitdokument anno 1989. Ed. Peters, Leipzig 1990, ISBN 3-369-00272-8.
- (ed.): Gustav Mahler. Leben, Werk, Interpretation, Rezeption. Anlässlich der Gewandhaus-Festtage 1985, Leipzig, 11. – 13. Oktober 1985 (Dokumente zur Gewandhausgeschichte. Vol. 5). Ed. Peters, Leipzig 1990, ISBN 3-369-00038-5.
- (ed.): Mitteldeutscher Rundfunk – die Geschichte des Sinfonieorchesters. Kamprad, Altenburg 1999, ISBN 3-930550-09-1.
- (ed.): Mitteldeutscher Rundfunk – Radio-Geschichte(n). Kamprad, Altenburg 2000, ISBN 3-930550-10-5.
- (ed.): Vom Kofferstudio zum Mediencenter. Die Geschichte des Rundfunks in Thüringen 1925–2000. Kamprad, Altenburg 2002, ISBN 3-930550-22-9.
- with Eszter Fontana and Veit Heller (ed.): Wenn Engel musizieren. Musikinstrumente von 1594 im Freiberger Dom. Stekovics, Dößel 2004, ISBN 3-89923-067-1. (2nd edition 2008: ISBN 978-3-89923-183-0)
- with Hagen Kunze (ed.): Der Thomanerchor Leipzig zwischen 1928 und 1950. Umbrüche: Erinnerungen und Dokumente. CD-Beilage mit frühesten Schallaufnahmen des Thomanerchores seit 1928 (Edition Thomanerchor. Vol. 1). Querstand, Altenburg 2013, ISBN 978-3-930550-96-8.
