= Erich Valentin =

German musicologist

Erich Valentin (27 November 1906 – 16 March 1993) was a German musicologist.

== Life ==
Born in Strasbourg, Valentin, the son of a postal clerk, studied musicology at the Ludwig-Maximilians-Universität München from 1925 and was awarded a doctorate in 1928 with his dissertation Die Entwicklung der Tokkata im 17. und 18. Jahrhunder. In 1931, he published the first independent Telemann biography on the occasion of the 250th birthday of Georg Philipp Telemann. From 1928 to 1935, he was a teacher at the seminar for music education in Magdeburg and music correspondent for various magazines, then he worked as a critic and music writer in Munich until 1939. In 1935, he proved to be a loyal partisan of the NS-regime, when he wrote in Musikgeschichte als Bildungsfaktor an article titled "Das Bildungsideal des neuen Staates ist wie sein politisches Ziel die Totalität".

According to the Reichsmusikkammer and his name file, Valentin was a member of the National Socialist German Workers' Party, but his name is missing from the central file of the NSDAP. During the period of National Socialism, Valentin published various music-historical works, such as Richard Wagner in 1937. Sinndeutung von Zeit und Werk and 1939 Hans Pfitzner, a German and in 1940, Ewig klingende Weise – Ein Lesebuch vom Wesen und Werden deutscher Musik.

After the Anschluss, he was appointed teacher at the Mozarteum in Salzburg in 1939, where he became lecturer for musicology and director of the Central Institute for Mozart Research. In addition, he was Secretary General of the International Mozarteum Foundation. In 1944, he was drafted into the Wehrmacht.

After the end of the Second World War, Valentin first lived in Mammendorf near Fürstenfeldbruck. From 1946 to 1947, he was a teacher at the home school Burg Sternberg/Lippe, and from 1949 to 1953 a lecturer at the Hochschule für Musik Detmold. In addition, he was editor-in-chief of the Neue Zeitschrift für Musik since 1949. In 1953, he was appointed as an extraordinary professor for musicology at the Hochschule für Musik und Theater München and in 1955, he was made an extraordinary professor.

In the German Democratic Republic, Valentin's book Ewig klingende Weise. Ein Lesebuch vom Wesen und Werden deutscher Musi (Bosse, Regensburg 1940) was placed on the List of literature to be discarded. Valentin was a founding member of the Gesellschaft für Bayerische Musikgeschichte.

From 1963 until his retirement in 1972, Valentin was director of the Munich Academy of Music. In 1965, he became chairman of the "Musikausschusses des Bayerischen Sängerbundes". Since May 1978, he had been retired and lived in Bad Aibling, where he died in 1993 at the age of 86.

== Awards ==
- 1971: Bavarian Order of Merit
- 1971: Mozart Medal of the Mozart Society of Vienna
- 1987: Bundesverdienstkreuz I. Klasse
- 1992: Georg-Philipp-Telemann-Preis der Landeshauptstadt Magdeburg

== Publications ==
- Handbuch der Musikinstrumentenkunde. Gustav Bosse, Regensburg 1954.
