= Thomaskantor =

Musical director of the Thomanerchor in Leipzig

Thomaskantor of Thomanerchor
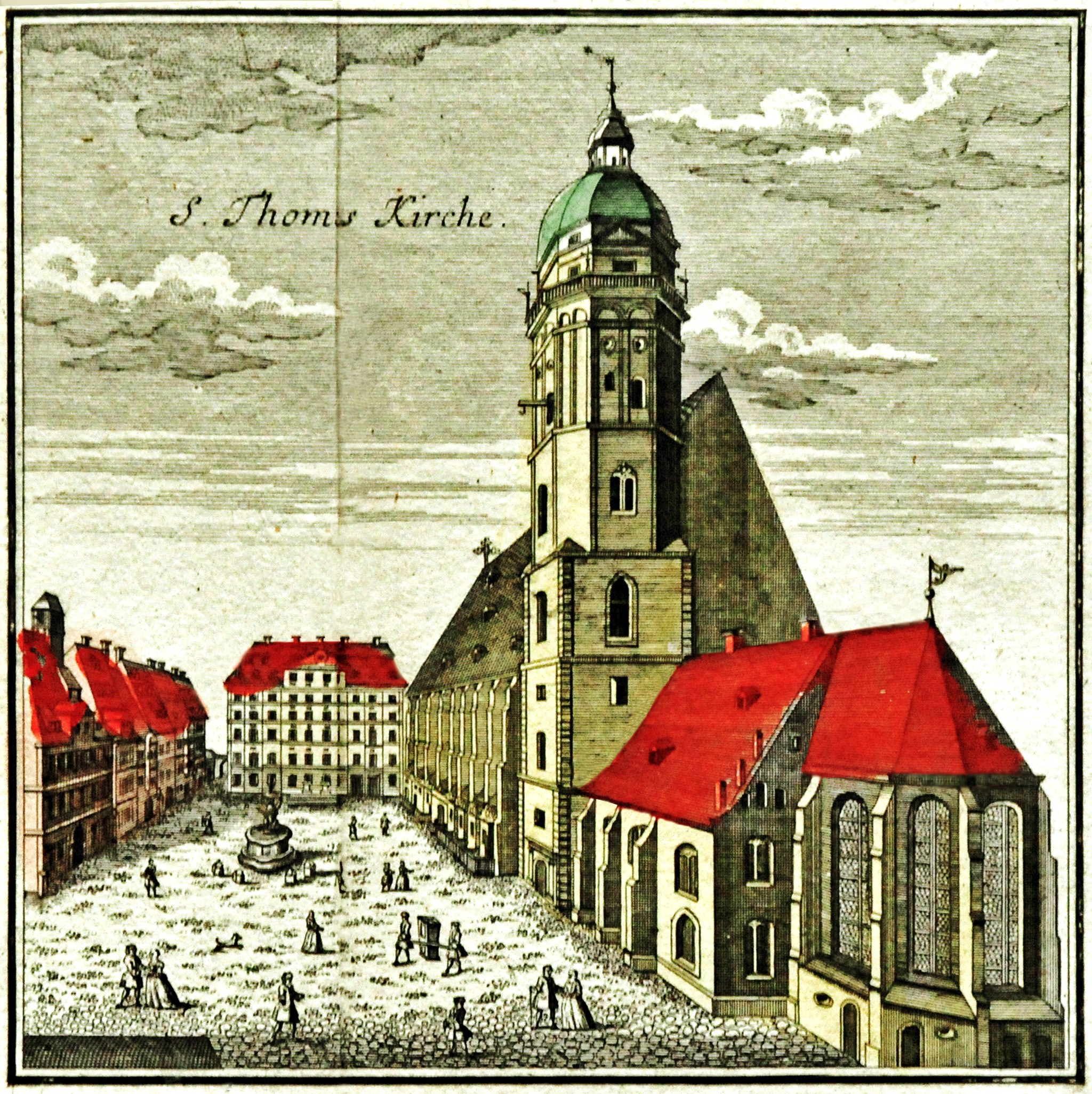
- Incumbent; Andreas Reize since 2021
- Type: Director of music
- Reports to: Leipzig
- Formation: 1518
- First holder: Georg Rhau

Thomaskantor (Cantor at St. Thomas) is the common name for the musical director of the Thomanerchor, an internationally known boys' choir founded in Leipzig in 1212. The official historic title of the Thomaskantor in Latin, Cantor et Director Musices, describes the two functions of cantor and director. As the cantor, he prepared the choir for service in four Lutheran churches, Thomaskirche (St. Thomas), Nikolaikirche (St. Nicholas), Neue Kirche (New Church) and Peterskirche (St. Peter). As director, he organized music for city functions such as town council elections and homages. Functions related to the university took place at the Paulinerkirche. Johann Sebastian Bach was the most famous Thomaskantor, from 1723 to 1750.

== Position ==
Leipzig is a commercial center, hosting a trade fair first mentioned in 1165. It has a university dating back to 1409. The city became Lutheran in the Reformation. The position of Thomaskantor at Bach's time has been described as "one of the most respected and influential musical offices of Protestant Germany.

The readings and required music of the Lutheran services in Leipzig were regulated in detail. The Church Book (Complete Church / Book / Containing / The Gospels and Epistles / For Every Feast-, Sun-, and Apostle Day Of the Entire Year ...) lists the prescribed readings, repeated every year. The church year began with the First Sunday in Advent and was divided in feast days, fasting periods and the feast-less time after Trinity Sunday. For music, there was mainly no concert music such as a cantata during the fasting times of Advent and Lent. Modest music was performed during the second half of the church year, and rich music with more complex instrumentation and more services per day on feast days. Christmas, Easter and Pentecost were celebrated for three days each, and many other feast days were observed. The library of St. Thomas contained works in vocal polyphony from the fifteenth century onward.

The Thomaskantor reported to the city council, the rector of the Thomasschule and the church superintendent. He had the duty to prepare the choir for service in the city's four Lutheran churches: the main churches Thomaskirche (St. Thomas) and the Nikolaikirche (St. Nicholas), and also the Neue Kirche (New Church) and the Peterskirche (St. Peter).

As cantor, the Thomaskantor had to compose and take care of copying, rehearsals and performances. He also had to teach music and general subjects. He took part in the admission process for new students to the school. The choir was divided in groups: the most advanced singers performed a cantata every Sunday, alternating between St. Thomas and St. Nicholas, a second group sang at the other church, beginners on feast days at the smaller churches. On high holidays, the cantata was performed in both churches, a morning service in one and a vespers service in the other. To earn additional funding, the choir performed also for weddings and funerals.

As director of music, the Thomaskantor was Leipzig's "senior musician", responsible for the music on official occasions such as town council elections and homages. Functions related to the university took place at the Paulinerkirche.

Today, the Thomaskantor leads the music in services at the Thomaskirche, including weekly afternoon services called Motette which often contain a Bach cantata. He also conducts the choir in recordings and on tours.

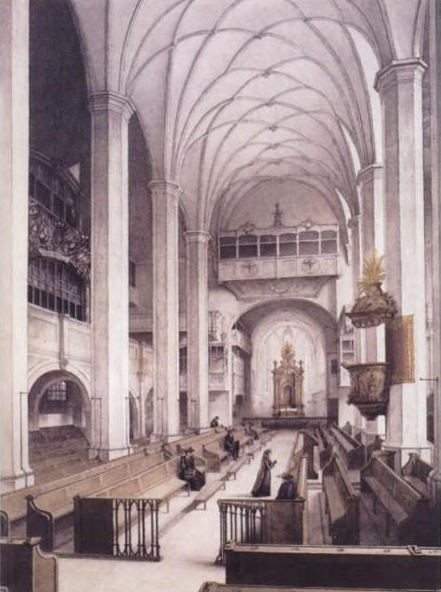
Thomaskirche,
1885

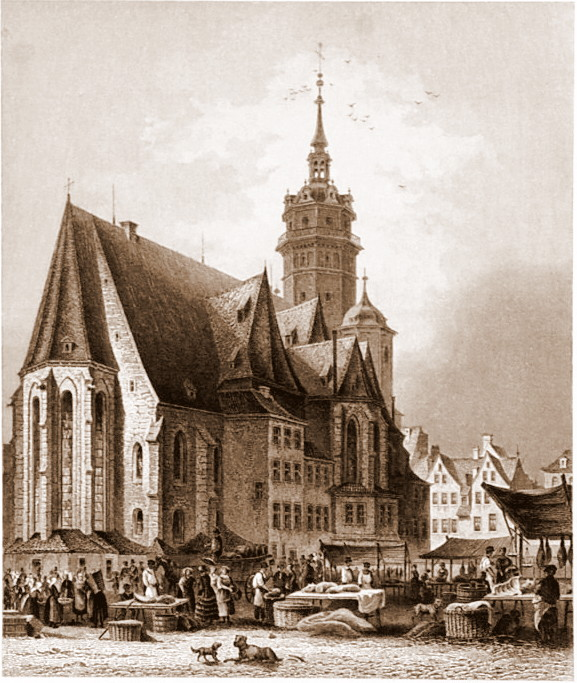
Nikolaikirche, ca. 1850

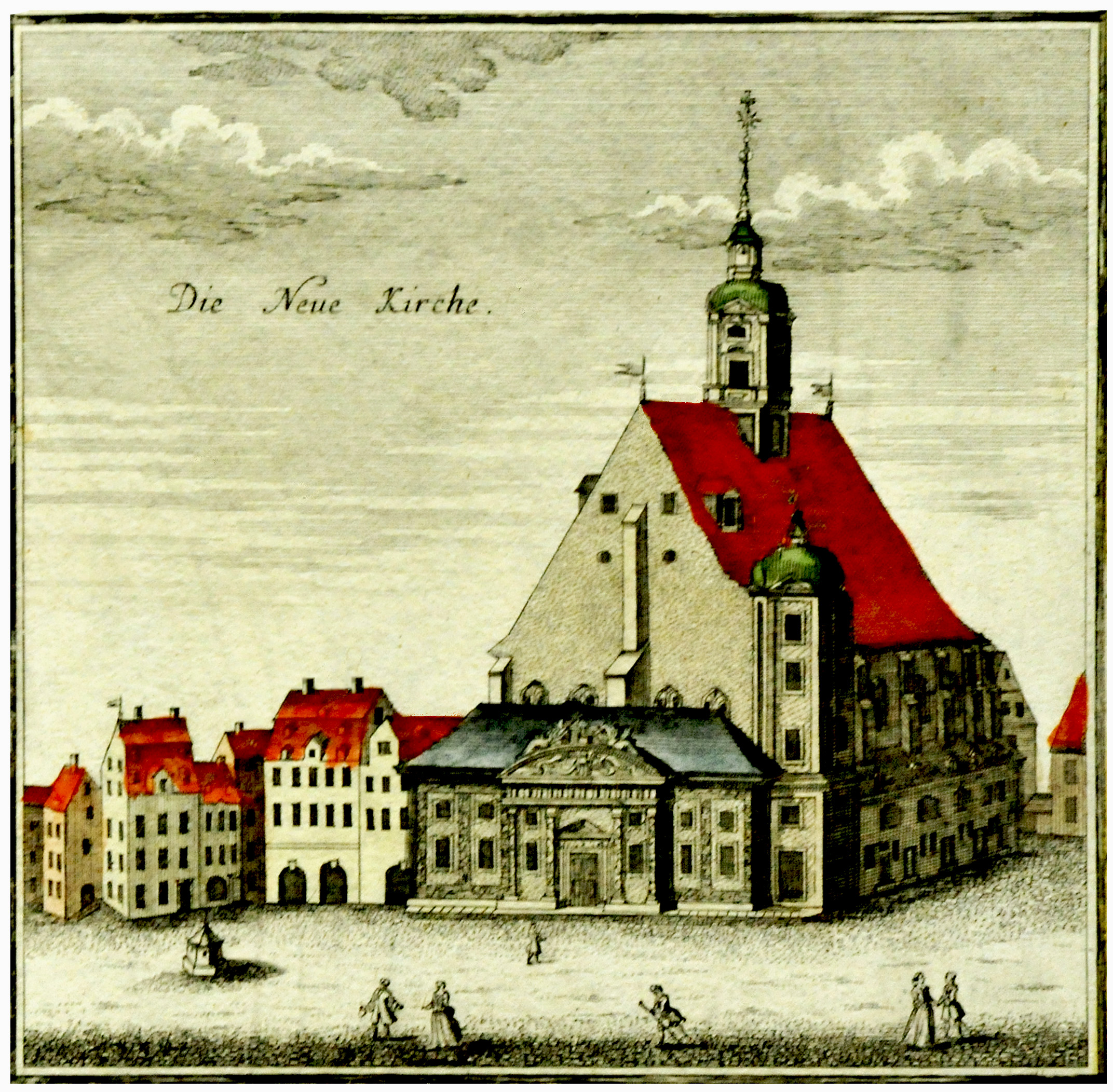
Neue Kirche,
1749

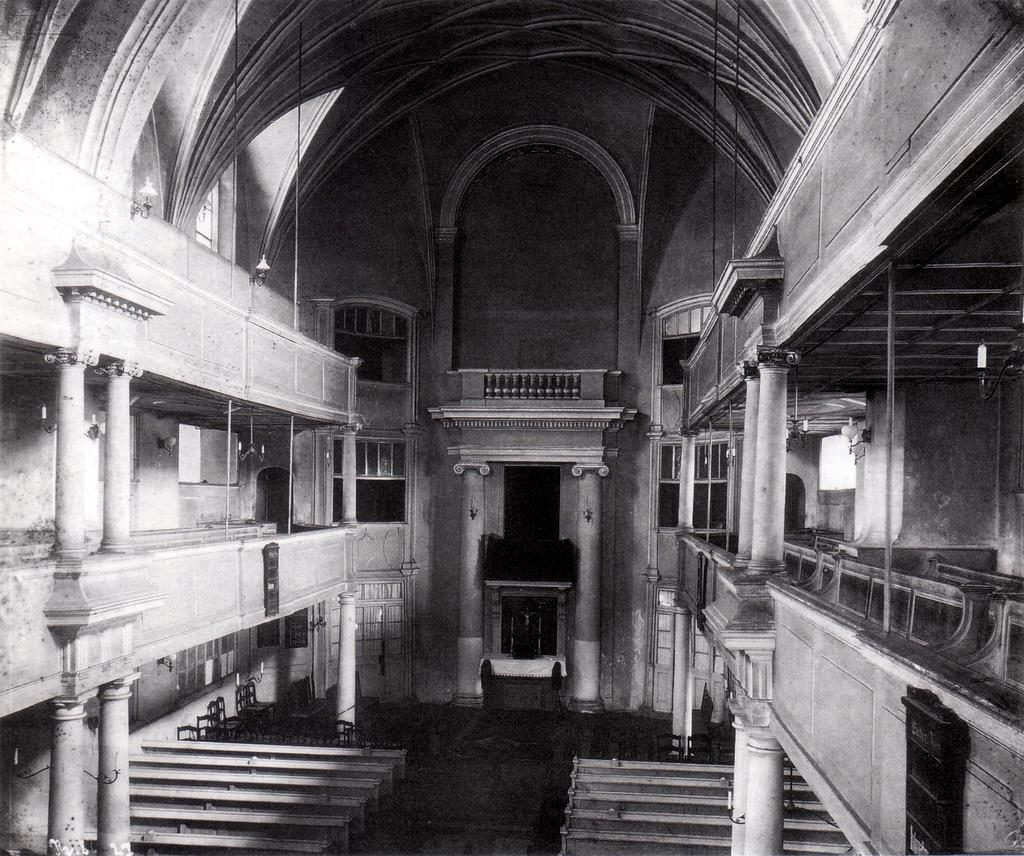
Peterskirche, before 1886

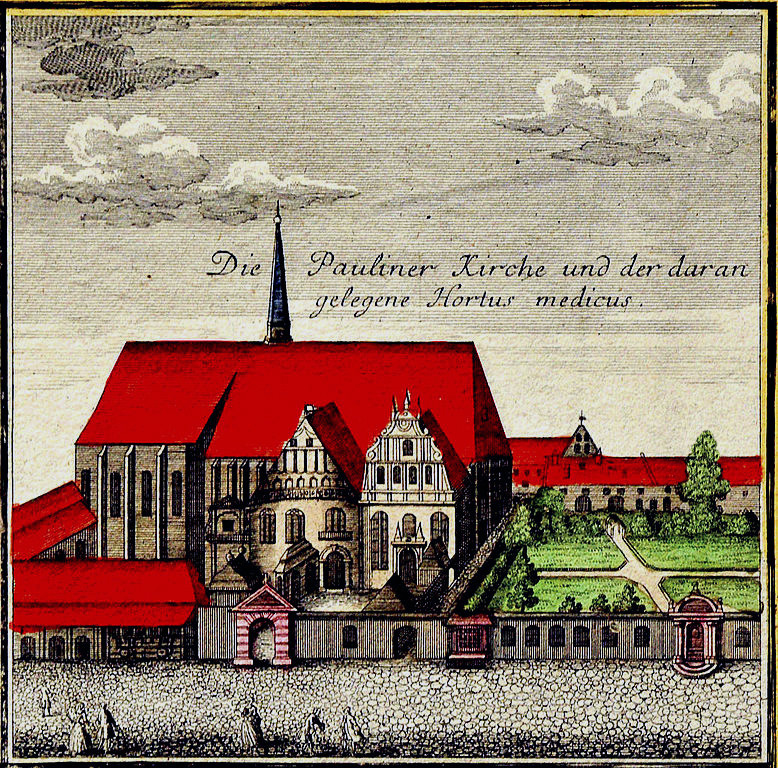
Paulinerkirche,
1749

== Known holders of the position ==
The following table shows the names of the known people in the position, and their time of service, in chronological order from the Reformation to now.

No.	No. after Bach	Image	Name	Tenure	Born	Died	Notes
1			Georg Rhau	1518–1520	c. 1488 in Eisfeld	6 August 1548 in Wittenberg	
2			Johannes Galliculus	1520–1525	c. 1490 in Dresden	c. 1550 in Leipzig	
3			Valerian Hüffeler	1526–1530			
4			Johannes Hermann	1531–1536	1515 in Zittau	22 April 1593 in Freiberg	
5			Wolfgang Jünger	1536–1539	c. 1517 in Sayda	4 March 1564 in Großschirma	
6			Johannes Bruckner	1539–1540			
7			Ulrich Lange	1540–1549		1549 in Leipzig	
8			Wolfgang Figulus	1549–1551	c. 1525 in Naumburg	1589 in Meißen	
9			Melchior Heger	1553–1564	in Brüx (today Most)		
10			Valentin Otto	1564–1594	1529 in Markkleeberg	April 1594	
11			Sethus Calvisius	1594–1615	21 February 1556 in Gorsleben	24 November 1615 in Leipzig	
12			Johann Hermann Schein	1615–1630	20 January 1586 in Grünhain	19 November 1630 in Leipzig	
13			Tobias Michael	1631–1657	13 June 1592 in Dresden	26 June 1657 in Leipzig	
14			Sebastian Knüpfer	1657–1676	6 September 1633 in Asch	10 October 1676 in Leipzig	
15			Johann Schelle	1677–1701	6 September 1648 in Geising	10 March 1701 in Leipzig	
16			Johann Kuhnau	1701–1722	6 April 1660 in Geising	5 June 1722 in Leipzig	
17			Johann Sebastian Bach	1723–1750	21 March 1685 in Eisenach	28 July 1750 in Leipzig	
18	1		Gottlob Harrer	1750–1755	1703 in Görlitz	9 July 1755 in Karlsbad	
19	2		Johann Friedrich Doles	1756–1789	23 April 1715 in Steinbach-Hallenberg	8 February 1797 in Leipzig	Longest-serving in the role.
20	3		Johann Adam Hiller	1789–1801	25 December 1728 in Wendisch-Ossig	16 June 1804 in Leipzig	1781–1785 Gewandhauskapellmeister
21	4		August Eberhard Müller	1801–1810	13 December 1767 in Northeim	3 December 1817 in Weimar	1810–1817 Großherzoglich-Sächsischer Hofkapellmeister
22	5		Johann Gottfried Schicht	1810–1823	29 September 1753 in Reichenau	16 February 1823 in Leipzig	
23	6		Christian Theodor Weinlig	1823–1842	25 July 1780 in Dresden	7 March 1842 in Leipzig	1814–1817 Kreuzkantor
24	7		Moritz Hauptmann	1842–1868	13 October 1792 in Dresden	3 January 1868 in Leipzig	
25	8		Ernst Friedrich Richter	1868–1879	24 October 1808 in Großschönau	9 April 1879 in Leipzig	
26	9		Wilhelm Rust	1880–1892	15 August 1822 in Dessau	2 May 1892 in Leipzig	
27	10		Gustav Schreck	1893–1918	8 September 1849 in Zeulenroda	22 January 1918 in Leipzig	
28	11		Karl Straube	1918–1939	6 January 1873 in Berlin	27 April 1950 in Leipzig	
29	12		Günther Ramin	1939–1956	15 October 1898 in Karlsruhe	27 February 1956 in Leipzig	
30	13		Kurt Thomas	1957–1960	25 May 1904 in Tönning	31 March 1973 in Bad Oeynhausen	
31	14		Erhard Mauersberger	1961–1972	29 December 1903 in Mauersberg / Marienberg	11 December 1982 in Leipzig	
32	15		Hans-Joachim Rotzsch	1972–1991	25 April 1929 in Leipzig	24 September 2013 in Leipzig	
33	16		Georg Christoph Biller	1992–2015	20 September 1955 in Nebra	27 January 2022	
34	17		Gotthold Schwarz	2016–2021	2 May 1952 in Zwickau		
35	18		Andreas Reize	2021	19 May 1975 in Solothurn, Switzerland		First Swiss and the first Catholic

== Bibliography ==
- Stefan Altner (2006): Das Thomaskantorat im 19. Jahrhundert. Bewerber und Kandidaten für das Leipziger Thomaskantorat in den Jahren 1842 bis 1918. Quellenstudien zur Entwicklung des Thomaskantorats und des Thomanerchors vom Wegfall der öffentlichen Singumgänge 1837 bis zur ersten Auslandsreise 1920. Leipzig: Passage-Verlag. ISBN 3-938543-15-9.
- Dürr, Alfred (1971). Die Kantaten von Johann Sebastian Bach (in German). Vol. 1. Bärenreiter-Verlag. OCLC 523584.
- Petzoldt, Martin (2013). "Liturgy and Music in Leipzig's Main Churches" (PDF) (in German). bach-cantatas.com.
- "Peterskirche Leipzig / Geschichte" (in German). St. Peter, Leipzig. 2015.
- Johann Gottfried Stallbaum (1842): Über den innern Zusammenhang musikalischer Bildung der Jugend mit dem Gesammtzwecke des Gymnasiums. Eine Inauguralrede, nebst biographischen Nachrichten über die Cantoren an der Thomasschule zu Leipzig. Leipzig: Fritzsche.
- Wolff, Christoph (1991). Bach: Essays on His Life and Music. Harvard University Press. ISBN 978-0-674-05926-9.
- Wolff, Christoph (2002). Johann Sebastian Bach: The Learned Musician. W. W. Norton & Company. ISBN 978-0-393-32256-9.
- Corinna Wörner (2023): Zwischen Anpassung und Resistenz. Der Thomanerchor Leipzig in zwei politischen Systemen. Studien und Materialien zur Musikwissenschaft, Bd. 123. Hildesheim: Georg Olms Verlag. (Abstract). ISBN 978-3-487-16232-4.
