= Ulrich Lange (composer) =

German composer and Thomaskantor

Ulrich Lange (died 1549) was a composer and Thomaskantor from 1541 to 1549.
