= Ulrich Lange =

Ulrich Lange may refer to:

- Ulrich Lange (composer)
- Ulrich Lange (politician)
