= Stefan Altner =

German musician and musicologist

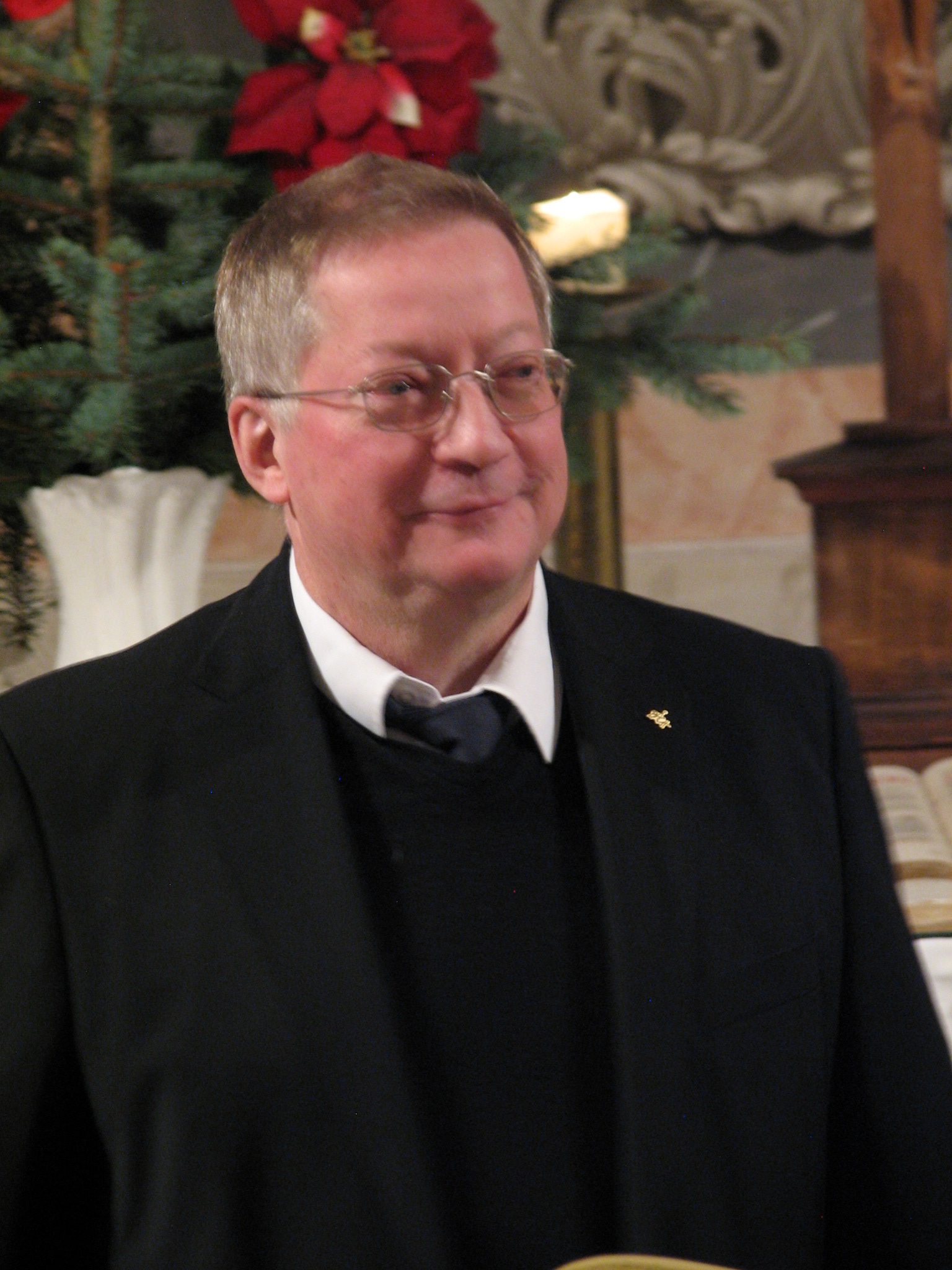
Stefan Altner (18 November 2018, Kirche Panitzsch)

Stefan Altner (born in 1956) is a German musician, musicologist and cultural manager.

== Life ==
Born in Brandis, Altner was a member of the Thomanerchor from 1966 to 1975 and attended the St. Thomas School in Leipzig. He then studied church music, e.g. organ with Thomas organist Hannes Kästner, piano with Herbert Sahling and basso continuo and harpsichord with Walter Heinz Bernstein, at the Leipzig Conservatory and, after graduating with a diploma in church music, worked as church musician in Zossen.

After a successful application for exit from the GDR, he moved to Munich in 1984. Altner then worked as literary editor for the Bärenreiter publishing house. From 1986 to 1993 he was managing director of the Munich Chamber Orchestra and harpsichordist among the baroque soloists of the Munich Philharmonic. From 1993 to 2019 he was managing director of the Thomanerchor.

In 2005, he received his first doctorate as Dr. phil. at the Leipzig University of Music and Theatre, supervised by Johannes Forner Altner is chairman of the board of the Thomanerchor Foundation. and co-initiator of the Leipzig education campus Forum Thomanum. He is also on the supervisory board of the Leipziger Blätter.

== Work ==
- Thomanerchor und Thomaskirche: Historisches und Gegenwärtiges in Bildern, Tauchaer Verlag, Taucha 1998.
- Das Thomaskantorat im 19. Jahrhundert: Bewerber und Kandidaten für das Leipziger Thomaskantorat in den Jahren 1842 bis 1918, Quellenstudien zur Entwicklung des Thomaskantorats und des Thomanerchors vom Wegfall der öffentlichen Singumgänge 1837 bis zur ersten Auslandsreise 1920 Passage-Verlag, Leipzig 2006.
- 800 Jahre Thomana, Stekovics, Wettin-Löbejün 2012 (edited with Martin Petzoldt).
- Der Thomanerchor Leipzig in frühesten Filmdokumenten: zwischen Tradition und Moderne. Edition Thomanerchor 2, Kamprad, Altenburg 2013 (edited with Günter Atteln and Hagen Kunze).
