= Georg Christoph Biller =

German choral conductor (1955–2022)

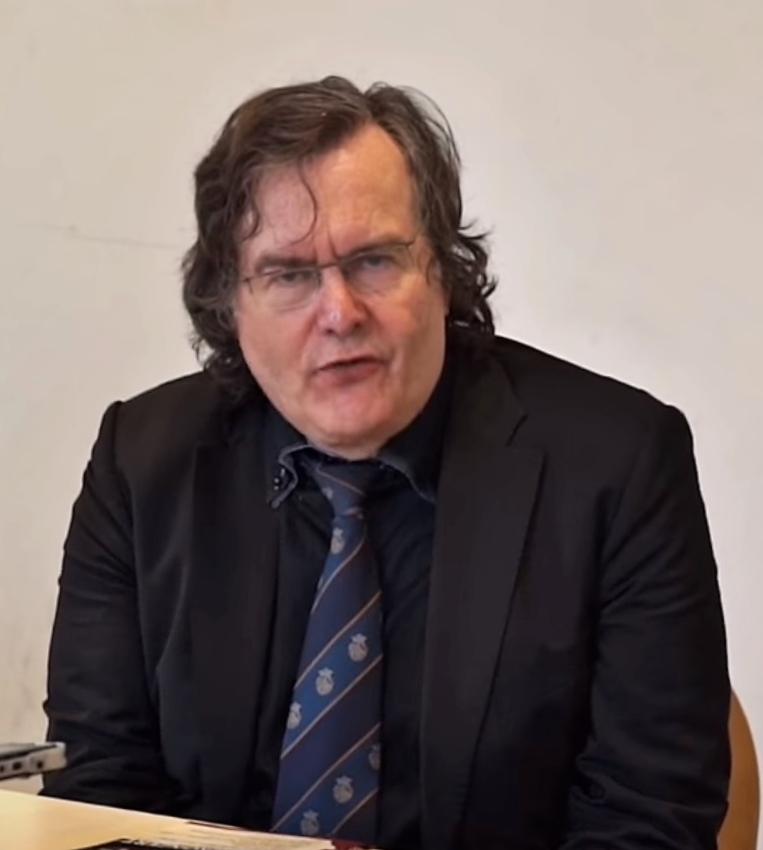
- Biller in 2015
- Born: 20 September 1955; Nebra, East Germany
- Died: 27 January 2022 (aged 66)
- Education: Thomanerchor; University of Music and Theatre Leipzig
- Occupations: Thomaskantor; Academic teacher; Composer
- Organizations: Kirchenmusikschule Halle; Hochschule für Musik Detmold; Musikhochschule Frankfurt; Thomanerchor; University of Music and Theatre Leipzig; Forum Thomanum
- Awards: Order of Merit of the Federal Republic of Germany

Georg Christoph Biller (20 September 1955 – 27 January 2022) was a German choral conductor. He conducted the Thomanerchor as the sixteenth Thomaskantor since Johann Sebastian Bach from 1992 to 2015. He was also a baritone, an academic teacher, and a composer. Active as Thomaskantor after the German reunification, Biller returned the Thomanerchor to its original focus on church music. He was instrumental in the new buildings for the choir's boarding school, the Forum Thomanum, and in the celebration of its 800th anniversary in 2012.

== Life and career ==
Born in Nebra, the son of a pastor, Biller grew up with three siblings. At age 10, he joined the Thomanerchor in Leipzig, living in its boarding school. He was a member from 1965 to 1974, with Erhard Mauersberger and Hans-Joachim Rotzsch. As Chorpräfekt, he assisted in conducting.

He studied at the Hochschule für Musik und Theater "Felix Mendelssohn Bartholdy" Leipzig from 1976 until 1981, orchestral conducting with Rolf Reuter and Kurt Masur, and voice with Bernd Siegfried Weber. In 1976, Biller founded the Leipziger Vokalkreis (later: Leipziger Vocalensemble) which he conducted into the 1990s. In 1980, he became choral conductor at the Gewandhaus and lecturer of choral conducting at the Kirchenmusikschule Halle. In 1982, Biller obtained his diploma in orchestral conducting from the Internationale Sommerakademie Mozarteum Salzburg. After German reunification, he was a lecturer for choral conducting at the Hochschule für Musik Detmold and at the Frankfurt University of Music and Performing Arts.

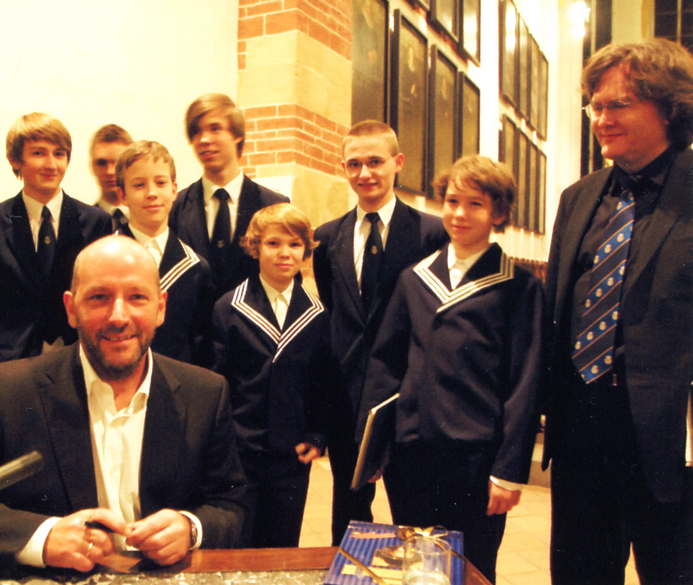
Biller (right) as conductor of the Thomanerchor with Robert Schneider at a reading at the Thomaskirche in 2008

In November 1992, Biller was appointed Thomaskantor as the 16th successor of Bach in this position. Biller returned the Thomanerchor to the original focus on church music, which had been neglected while Leipzig was in East Germany; he established the choir in the liturgy of the Lutheran service and reintroduced Motette, a type of musical vespers service, in the Thomaskirche. The choir performed regularly three times a week there, Motette every Friday evening and Saturday afternoon, typically including a Bach cantata for the liturgical occasion, and Sunday service. In 2009, he began performances of the six cantatas of Bach's Christmas Oratorio in St. Thomas and St. Nicholas in services for the feast days of the Christmas season as Bach had intended 275 years earlier.

From 2002, Biller was instrumental in the concept and new buildings for the boarding school of the Thomanerchor, the Forum Thomanum as a musical education campus (musikalischer Bildungscampus). In 2012, Biller celebrated the 800th anniversary of the Thomanerchor. The internationally recognised event, prepared from 2008, was a highlight of his tenure as Thomaskantor. It exposed works by Bach, but also by Biller. He resigned as Thomaskantor in January 2015 for health reasons.

In January 1994, Biller was appointed professor of choral conducting at the Felix Mendelssohn-Bartholdy Hochschule. In 1996, he became a member of the Sächsische Akademie der Künste (Academy of Arts of Saxony).

== Personal life ==
Biller was married to the actress Ute Loeck. He had depression and a serious neurological disease that increasingly limited his motion, and was reliant on a wheelchair from 2019. In the last months of his life, he exchanged thoughts with Andreas Reize, the new Thomaskantor, sure that Reize would continue his work with the choir. Biller died on 27 January 2022, at the age of 66.

== Publications ==
=== Recordings ===
- J. S. Bach: Matthäus-Passion, Martin Petzold, Andreas Schmidt, Monika Frimmer, Bogna Bartosz, Olaf Bär, Thomanerchor & Gewandhaus Kinderchor, Gewandhausorchester Leipzig, conductor Georg Christoph Biller, Unitel 1998 OCLC 314201554
- J. S. Bach: Johannes-Passion, Marcus Ullmann, Gotthold Schwarz, Ruth Holton, Matthias Rexroth, Henryk Böhm, Thomanerchor, Gewandhausorchester Leipzig, conductor Georg Christoph Biller, Rondeau 2007 OCLC 1104802402

=== Videos ===
- Christina Landshamer, soprano; Stefan Kahle, alto; Wolfram Lattke, Martin Lattke, tenors; Klaus Mertens, Gotthold Schwarz, basses; Thomanerchor; Gewandhausorchester Leipzig; Georg Christoph Biller, conductor (2012). Georg Christoph Biller conducts Bach: St. Matthew's Passion (in German). OCLC 824647499.

=== Writings ===
- Biller, Georg (2018). Die Jungs vom hohen C / Erinnerungen eines Thomaskantors (in German). Halle (Saale): Mitteldeutscher Verlag. ISBN 978-3-95462-951-0. OCLC 1008600406.

=== Compositions ===
- Eine kleine Thomasmusik (alluding to Mozart's Eine kleine Nachtmusik, 2000)
- Naunhofer Choralbuch (Naunhof book of chorales, 2000)
- In einem Glauben (In one faith, 2009)
- Der apostolische Segen (The apostolic blessing, 2011)
- Responsorien (2012)
- Gesänge nach Worten von Clemens Brentano (songs after Clemens Brentano, 2012)
- 7 Lieder aus Stille (Seven songs from silence, 2012)
- Psalmen David (Psalms of David, 2012)
- Der Nebraer Himmelspsalm (The Nebra heavenly psalm, 2012)
- Res severa verum gaudium (a round, 2012)
- Herr, tue meine Lippen auf (Lord, open my lips, 2012/13)
- Verleih uns Friede (Grant us peace, 2012/13)
- Hiobs Botschaft (Job's message, 2014/2018)

== Awards ==
- 1985 Osaka Music Prize
- 2012 Echo Klassik
- 2012 Mendelssohn Prize of the City of Leipzig
- 2013 Honorary Member of the Richard Wagner Society Leipzig
- 2014 Officer's Cross of the Order of Merit of the Federal Republic of Germany
