= August Eberhard Müller =

German composer, organist and choir leader

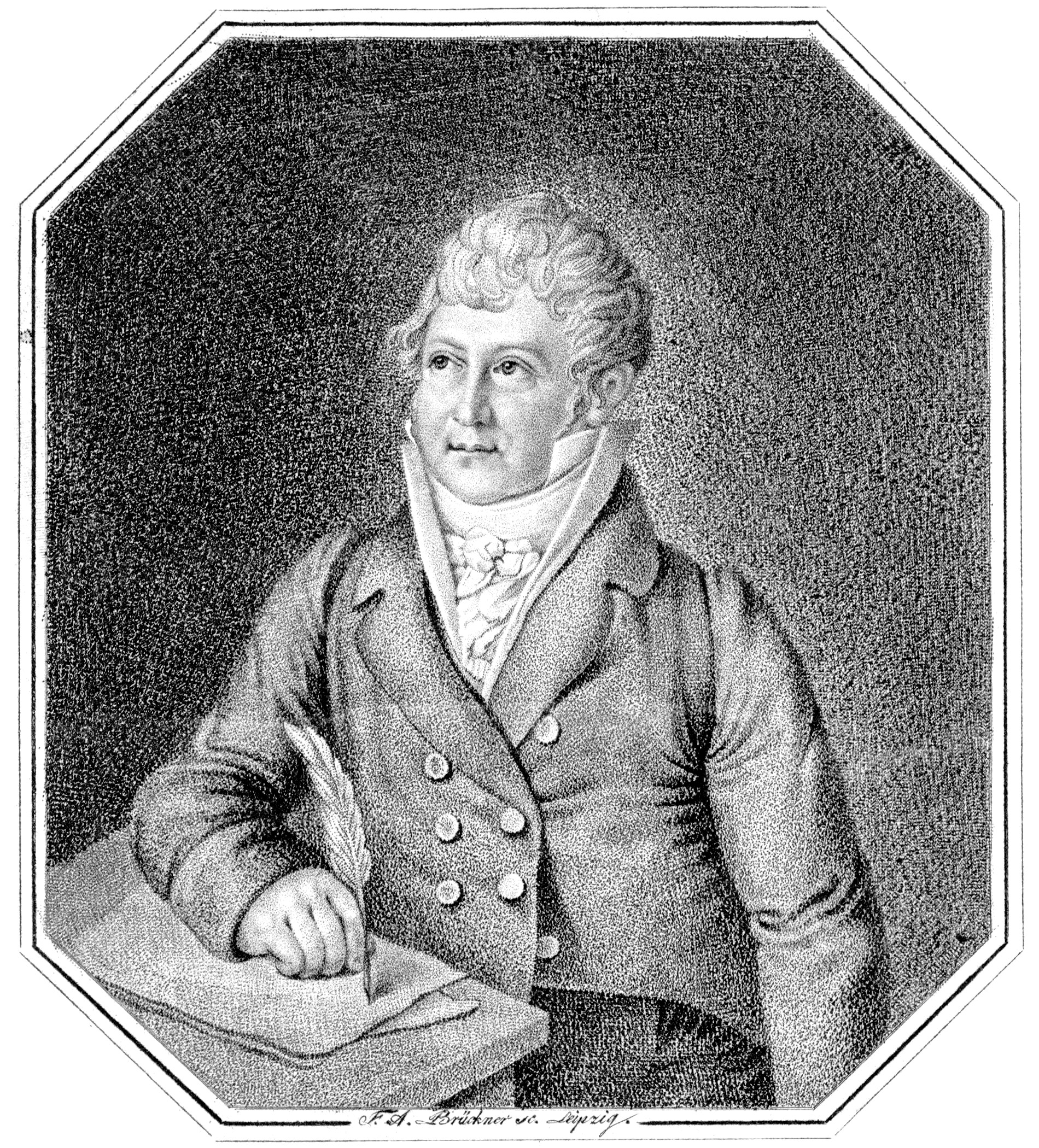
August Eberhard Müller

August Eberhard Müller (13 December 1767, Northeim – 3 December 1817, Weimar) was a German composer, organist and choir leader.

== Life ==
Trained by his organist father, he made his first public performance aged eight. He then studied under Johann Christoph Friedrich Bach at Bückeburg, where Müller served as organist at the Ulrichskirche until 1788. From 1789 he worked as choir leader, teacher and organist in Magdeburg.

On the recommendation of Johann Friedrich Reichardt, whom he had met in Berlin in 1792, Müller was made organist of the St. Nicholas Church in Leipzig in 1794. In 1800 he was made the assistant to Johann Adam Hiller, who he succeeded as Thomaskantor on his death in 1804. In 1810 he became Kapellmeister of the ducal court in Weimar.

Müller kept J. S. Bach's works in the repertoire and also contributed to the spread of Viennese Classicism. In 1801 he conducted the first performance outside Vienna of Haydn's The Seasons. He composed for the piano, writing two concertos, fourteen sonatas and various capriccios and other pieces. He also wrote seven flute concertos and other works for flute and orchestra, along with études for flute and piano. His son, Theodor Amadeus Müller, was a violinist.

== Works ==
- Anleitung zum genauen und richtigen Vortrage der Mozart´schen Clavierconcerte in Absicht richtiger Applicatur. Leipzig 1797
- La Clemenza di Tito / Opera seria composta da W. A. Mozart. Titus / ernsthafte Oper in zwei Akten von W. A. Mozart / aufs neue für das Klavier ausgezogen von A[ugust] E.[berhard] Müller. Bei Breitkopf und Härtel in Leipzig. Pr. 2 Thlr. [1803; his first piano adaptation of the opera appeared in 1795].
