= The Boys Choir of St Ursus Cathedral in Solothurn =

Swiss boys choir

The Boys' Choir of St Ursus Cathedral in Solothurn (German: Singknaben der St. Ursenkathedrale Solothurn) are a Swiss boys' choir from Solothurn. The tradition of the choir is based on the medieval Schola of St. Ursenstift, the collegiate church that preceded Solothurn Cathedral, and which is first mentioned in 742. This makes the choir the oldest boys' choir in Switzerland. The choir is denominationally neutral today. The repertoire includes both religious and secular choral literature from all eras.

== Activities ==
The choir comprises more than 60 boys and young men who spend three or four hours a week singing. The intensive rehearsals apply to the development of new literature in individual parts as well as in the entire choir. A professional vocal artist and a singing teacher accompany the work of the Singknaben. The pivotal point in the musical year of the choir is the singing of the boys' voices, during which the program for the annual autumn concert is worked out. The performance in Solothurn is usually followed by a tour of guest concerts in different European countries. In addition, the Christmas Oratorio by Johann Sebastian Bach has been an integral part and traditional highlight of the concert program of the Solothurner Singknaben for several years.

The diverse repertoire of singers includes not only contemporary choral music but also Gregorian chants, motets, cantatas, masses, as well as secular and sacred songs, including folk songs from Switzerland and other countries.

== History ==
The history of the choir is rooted in the founding of the St. Ursenstift, which already by 742 had a boys choir, the Choraulen. With over 1,200 years of history, the Singknaben are the oldest boys' choir in Switzerland and also one of the most traditional choirs in Europe. In earlier centuries, the boys' assignment was limited to singing the Latin Mass in unison. Until well into the 20th century, the choir consisted only of a few singers. In 1971, Peter Scherer took over the management of the then five-member choir and built him in the following years to a representative boys choir. With Andreas Reize, who was already a boy member of the choir, the Singknaben had, from 2007 to 2021, for the first time a musical director emerged from their own ranks. Other former members of the Solothurn Boys' Choir now perform as professional singers on international stages.
