= Zürcher Bach Chor =

Mixed choir in Zürich

The Zürcher Bach Chor is a mixed choir in Zürich, Switzerland, dedicated to the works of Johann Sebastian Bach.

It was founded in 1947, and first performed exclusively works by Bach. From 1963, the repertory was widened, including even works of the 20th century, such as Stravinsky's Messe für Chor und Doppelbläserquintett in 1972, Paul Hindemith's Flieder-Requiem in 1977 and 2003, Penderecki's Te Deum in 1986, Janáček's Glagolitische Messe in 1988, Late Swallows by Delius in 1997, Lili Boulanger's Psalm 130 Du fond de l’abime in 1997 and Britten's War Requiem in 2002.

== Musical directors ==
- 1947–1951: Albert E. Kaiser
- 1951–1972: Bernhard Henking
- 1972–2011: Peter Eidenbenz
- 2011–2021: Andreas Reize
- since 2021: Annedore Neufeld

== Literature ==
- Chronik zum 50-jährigen Bestehen des Zürcher Bach-Chor. Zürcher Bach-Chor, [Herrliberg] 1997.
