= Dorothee Oberlinger =

German recorder player and professor (born 1969)

- Born: 2 September 1969 (age 55); Aachen, Germany
- Children: 1
- Website: www.dorotheeoberlinger.de

Dorothee Oberlinger (born 2 September 1969) is a German recorder player and professor.

== Biography ==
Dorothee Oberlinger was born in Aachen and raised in Simmern. At the University of Cologne, she studied music education and German studies. After university, she studied recorder in Cologne, Amsterdam and Milan. Her teachers include Günther Höller (Hochschule für Musik und Tanz Köln), Walter van Hauwe (Amsterdam) and Pedro Memelsdorff (Milan). In 1997 she won the first prize at the international "Moeck" UK / SRP competition. In 1998, she made her solo debut at London's Wigmore Hall.

As a soloist, she has performed with internationally renowned ensembles and baroque orchestras, such as the Sonatori de la Gioiosa Marca, Musica Antiqua Köln, and the Academy of Ancient Music. In 2002, she founded the chamber group Ensemble 1700. They have received several prizes and awards for their recordings

Since 2004, Oberlinger has been professor at the Mozarteum in Salzburg and director of the Institute for Early Music and first deputy director of the Institute for New Music. Since 2009, she has also been director of Arolser Baroque Festival.

== Discography ==
- 2001: A. Vivaldi – Concerti Per Flauto (Ornamente 99)
- 2004: Peripheries – Contemporary and Medieval music for Recorder
- 2005: Vivaldi – Concerti Per Flauto E Flautino (Sonatori de la Gioiosa Marca)
- 2007: Italian Sonatas
- 2008: Telemann (Ensemble 1700)
- 2009: Blockflötenkonzerte – Telemann, Graupner, Schultze (with Reinhard Goebel, Ensemble 1700)
- 2010: French Baroque – Versailles 1700–1740 (Ensemble 1700)
- 2012: Flauto Veneziano (Sonatori de la Gioiosa Marca)
- 2013: Telemann – 12 Fantasias
- 2014: The Passion of Musick (Ensemble 1700, Vittorio Ghielmi, Il Suonar Parlante Orchestra)
- 2017: Bach – Small Gifts
- 2022: Pastorale (Ensemble 1700, Dorothee Mields, Li piffari e le muse)

== Awards ==
- ECHO Klassik 2008 "Best Instrumentalist of the Year" for Italian Sonatas
- Diapason d'Or for Flauto Veneziano
- ECHO Klassik 2013 "Concert Recording of the Year" for Flauto Veneziano
- ECHO Klassik 2015 "Chamber Music Recording of the Year (17th/18th century music | Mixed ensemble)" for The Passion of Musick
- Georg-Philipp-Telemann-Preis der Landeshauptstadt Magdeburg 2020
- Officers Cross of the Order of Merit of the Federal Republic of Germany 2021
