= Theodor Amadeus Müller =

German violinist

Theodor Amadeus Müller (20 May 1798, Leipzig - 11 March 1846 in Weimar) was a German violinist. He was the son of the composer August Eberhard Müller. He learned violin under Louis Spohr before performing as a violinist in the chapel-orchestra of the Grand Duke of Saxe-Weimar-Eisenach. He composed orchestral works along with several solos and duets for violin, which were much praised in their time.
