= Melchior Heger =

German choir director and conductor (fl. 16th century)

Melchior Heger was Thomaskantor from 1553 to 1564. He began studying music in Leipzig in 1542. In 1553 he became choir director and held this position until 1564.
