= Hagen Kunze =

German journalist

Hagen Kunze (born 1973) is a German journalist, music critic and playwright.

== Life ==
Kunze comes from a pastor's family and learned piano at an early age. He attended the special school for music education in Zwickau and studied musicology, journalism and philosophy in Leipzig, Graz and Halle (Saale). Afterwards, he worked as a freelance journalist and music critic as well as church musician - he wrote for daily newspapers and professional journals, such as the Neue Musikzeitung.

Kunze was an editor and later editorial director of the Döbelner Allgemeine Zeitung - Leipziger Volkszeitung. This was followed by a position as personal assistant to the Saxon CDU member of the European Parliament Lutz Goepel. From 2008 to 2012, he was chief dramaturge of the Mittelsächsisches Theater in Freiberg/Döbeln. He also worked as a teacher at the Döbeln grammar school. Since 2013, he has been teaching at the Evangelische Oberschule Lunzenau. Kunze gained media recognition when he appeared in the satirical programme Extra3 and a TV report was dedicated to him. This happened because he did not have a particulate matter sticker on his electric car and parked in Leipzig.

Kunze is a member of the CDU.

== Work ==
- Das kleine Bach-Büchlein: ein Gespräch mit Johann Sebastian Bach., Minibibliothek, Buchverlag für die Frau, Leipzig 2000.
- Lobgesang: Mendelssohn in Leipzig, Lehmanns Media, Berlin 2009.
- Clara & Robert Schumann: Musik und Liebe, 2009.
- Musikalischer Stadtrundgang durch Leipzig, 2012.
- Musenkuss: Richard Wagner und die Frauen., 2013.
- Der Thomanerchor Leipzig zwischen 1928 und 1950: Umbrüche: Erinnerungen und Dokumente. CD supplement with the earliest sound recordings of the Thomanerchor since 1928, Edition Thomanerchor vol. 1, Querstand, Altenburg 2013 (ed. with Steffen Lieberwirth).
- Der Thomanerchor Leipzig in frühesten Filmdokumenten. Zwischen Tradition und Moderne; DVD with Filmdokumenten des Thomanerchores von 1941,1942 and 2012, Edition Thomanerchor Bd. 2, Querstand, Altenburg 2013 (ed. with Stefan Altner and Günter Atteln)
- Das Thomaner-Büchlein, 2014.
- Große Sachsen, Minibibliothek, 2015.
- Die Geheimnisse der Familie Bach, 2015.
- Wunderkinder.
- 200 Jahre Opernchor Leipzig (ed.), Verlag Klaus-Jürgen Kamprad, Altenburg 2017
- Große Thüringer, 2017
- Spioninnen: Mata Hari und andere Frauen in geheimer Mission, 2017
- Gin, 2018
- Leonardo da Vinci, 2019
- Beethoven und die Liebe, 2019
