= 1023 Thomana =

Rare-type carbonaceous background asteroid

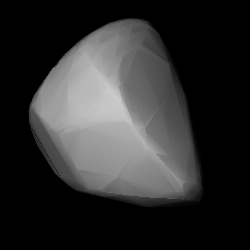
- Shape model of Thomana from its lightcurve

Discovery
- Discovered by: K. Reinmuth
- Discovery site: Heidelberg Obs.
- Discovery date: 25 June 1924

Designations
- Named after: St. Thomas Choir of Leipzig (German boys' choir)
- Alternative designations: 1924 RU · 1936 RG
- Minor planet category: main-belt · (outer)

Orbital characteristics
- Epoch 4 September 2017 (JD 2458000.5)
- Uncertainty parameter 0
- Observation arc: 92.86 yr (33,916 days)
- Aphelion: 3.4893 AU
- Perihelion: 2.8442 AU
- Semi-major axis: 3.1667 AU
- Eccentricity: 0.1019
- Orbital period (sidereal): 5.64 yr (2,058 days)
- Mean anomaly: 107.00°
- Mean motion: 0° 10^{m} 29.64^{s} / day
- Inclination: 10.078°
- Longitude of ascending node: 194.32°
- Argument of perihelion: 194.19°

Physical characteristics
- Dimensions: 53.28±20.25 km 58.27±1.6 km (IRAS:11); 61.02±1.00 km 61.34±4.17 km
- Synodic rotation period: 17.56±0.05 h 17.56±0.01 h 17.561±0.007 h 17.5611±0.0005 h
- Geometric albedo: 0.05±0.05; 0.059±0.012; 0.060±0.002; 0.0649±0.004 (IRAS:11)
- Spectral type: Tholen = G · G B–V = 0.764; U–B = 0.493
- Absolute magnitude (H): 9.76 · 9.99 · 10.26±0.57

1023 Thomana, provisional designation 1924 RU, is a rare-type carbonaceous background asteroid from the outer regions of the asteroid belt, approximately 58 kilometers in diameter. It was discovered on 25 June 1924, by German astronomer Karl Reinmuth at Heidelberg Observatory in southwest Germany. The asteroid was named after the St. Thomas Choir of Leipzig.

== Classification and orbit ==
Thomana orbits the Sun in the outer main-belt at a distance of 2.8–3.5 AU once every 5 years and 8 months (2,058 days). Its orbit has an eccentricity of 0.10 and an inclination of 10° with respect to the ecliptic. The asteroid's observation arc begins at Heidelberg, one night after its official discovery observation.

== Physical characteristics ==
In the Tholen classification, Thomana is an uncommon carbonaceous G-type asteroid.

=== Rotation period ===
Between 2006 and 2009, three rotational lightcurves of Thomana were obtained from photometric observations by astronomers James W. Brinsfield, Pierre Antonini as well as René Roy and Laurent Bernasconi. Lightcurve analysis gave a concurring rotation period of 17.56 hours with a brightness variation between 0.27 and 0.36 magnitude (U=2/2/3-).

=== Spin axis ===
In 2016, an international study modeled a lightcurve from various data sources with a period of 17.5611 hours and found two spin axis of (86.0°, −65.0°) and (272.0°, −42.0°), respectively, in ecliptic coordinates (λ, β) (Q=n.a.).

=== Diameter and albedo ===
According to the surveys carried out by the Infrared Astronomical Satellite IRAS, the Japanese Akari satellite, and NASA's Wide-field Infrared Survey Explorer with its subsequent NEOWISE mission, Thomana measures between 53.28 and 61.34 kilometers in diameter and its surface has an albedo between 0.05 and 0.065. The Collaborative Asteroid Lightcurve Link adopts the results obtained by IRAS, that is an albedo of 0.0649 and a diameter of 58.27 kilometers based on an absolute magnitude of 9.76.

== Naming ==
This minor planet was named by the discoverer after the St. Thomas Choir of Leipzig ("Thomanerchor"), a boys' choir at St. Thomas Church in Leipzig, Germany, where Johann Sebastian Bach used to work as music director. The official naming citation was published by Paul Herget in The Names of the Minor Planets in 1955 (H 98; LDS).
