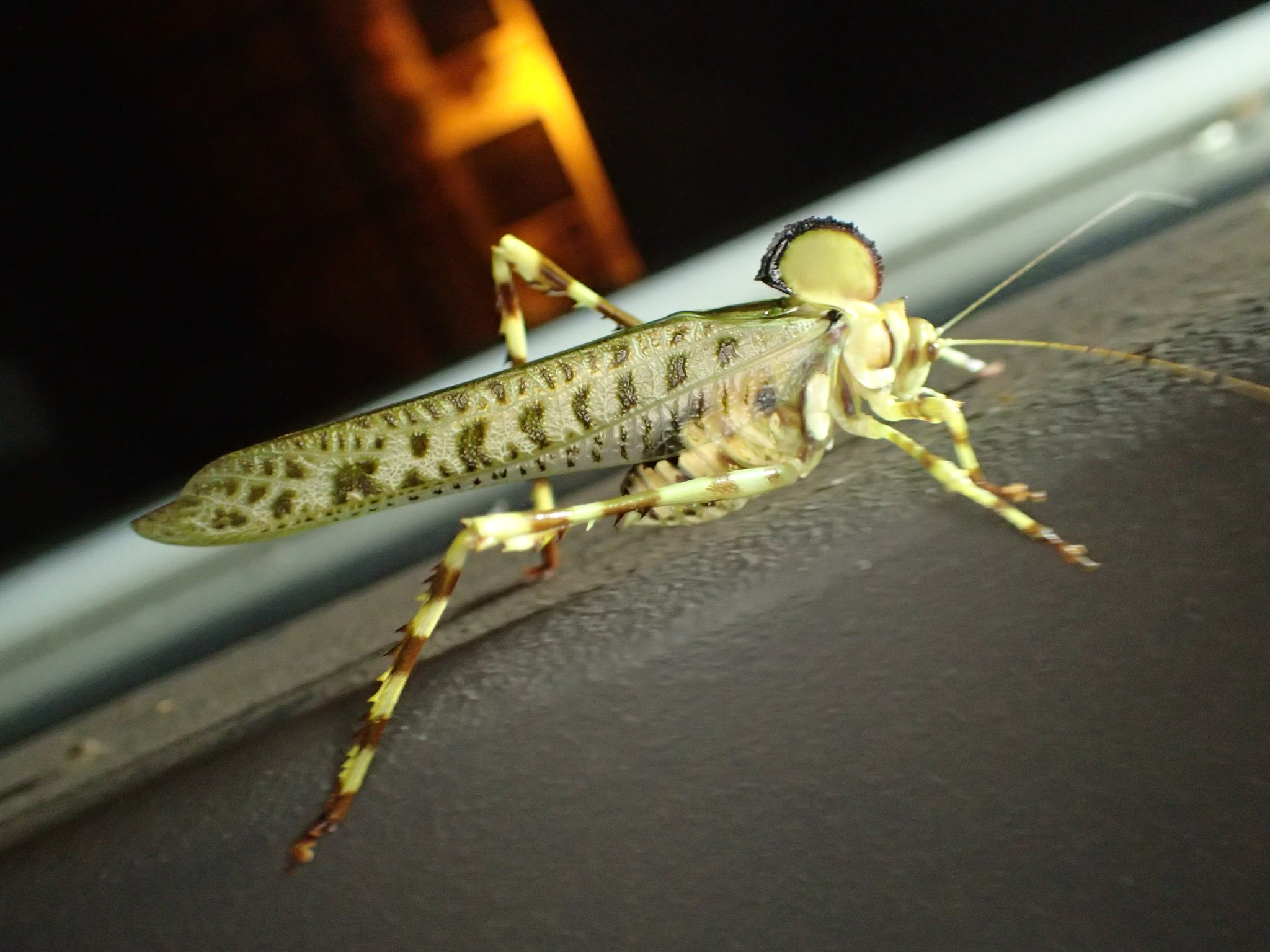
- Alectoria superba

Scientific classification
- Kingdom: Animalia
- Phylum: Arthropoda
- Class: Insecta
- Order: Orthoptera
- Suborder: Ensifera
- Family: Tettigoniidae
- Subfamily: Phaneropterinae
- Genus: Alectoria; Brunner von Wattenwyl, 1879
- Species: A. superba

Binomial name
- Alectoria superba Brunner von Wattenwyl, 1879

Synonyms
- Hectoria pontoni Tepper, 1892

= Alectoria superba =

Genus of cricket-like animals

Alectoria superba is a species of Australian bush crickets or katydids in the subfamily Phaneropterinae. It is the only species in the monotypic genus Alectoria. The genus is placed in the genus group Ephippithytae; both genus and species were described in 1879 by Carl Brunner von Wattenwyl.

== Species ==
The Orthoptera Species File includes the single species Alectoria superba (Brunner von Wattenwyl, 1879), which is sometimes called the "Australian crested katydid"; the type locality is Peak Downs, Queensland.
