= Martin Christian Vogel =

German operatic tenor

Martin Christian Vogel (born 3 February 1951) is a German operatic tenor, singing teacher, Hochschulrektor and theologian.

== Life ==
Born in Chemnitz, Vogel's musical career began as a member of the Leipzig Thomanerchor. After his Abitur at the Thomasschule, he studied Protestant theology at the Karl-Marx-Universität Leipzig, which he completed with a diploma. He then studied singing at the University of Music and Theatre Leipzig He also graduated with a diploma in singing from the University of Music and Theatre Leipzig. Vogel learnt voice projection with the Thomanerchor while still a student and was engaged as a lyric tenor and tenorbuffo at the Leipzig Opera.

After ten years, Vogel moved to Berlin in 1989 and received an engagement at the Deutsche Oper Berlin. Guest performances and concert tours took him to numerous countries around the world.

In 1991, Vogel was appointed professor of singing at the Hochschule für Musik Detmold. From 1997 to 2001, he was dean, and in 2001 he was elected rector of the Hochschule. He held this office until 2014.

In 1999, Vogel founded the association "Initiative Detmolder Sommertheater" and led it as chairman of the board until 2012.

From 2007 to 2020, Vogel was a member of the board of the Liz Mohn Culture and Music Foundation. In 2006, he was a founding member of the Studienfonds OWL foundation. Initially as a member of the board, later as a member of the board of trustees and as its chairman, he is still a member of the board today. In 2007, he created the Foundation of the Hochschule für Musik Detmold and is still a member of the board of trustees. In 2012, he was appointed a member of the board of trustees of the Sibylle and Hannes Frank Foundation. Vogel has been an honorary knight of the Order of St. John since 2012.

Vogel has been active as artistic director of the newly founded concert series "Stars of Tomorrow" at the World Heritage Site Princely Abbey of Corvey since 2016.
