= Charles Kiefer-Hablitzel =

Swiss businessman, industrialist and patron

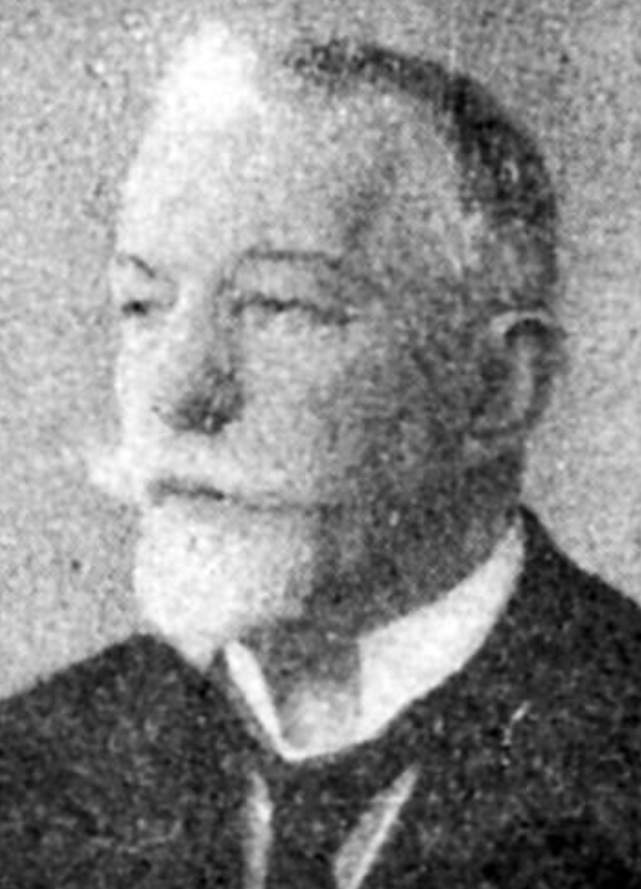
- Kiefer-Hablitzel, ca. 1945
- Born: Karl Anton Kiefer; May 17, 1872; Basel, Basel, Switzerland,
- Died: August 15, 1947 (aged 75); Dreilinden Estate, Lucerne, Lucerne, Switzerland,
- Occupations: Businessman, industrialist and patron
- Known for: Principal shareholder and board member of Banco do Brasil, Founder of Kiefer-Hablitzel Foundation
- Spouse: Mathilde Hablitzel (m. 1902)

Antoine Charles Kiefer-Hablitzel (né Karl Anton Kiefer; May 17, 1872 – August 15, 1947) was a Swiss businessman, industrialist and patron. He was known for founding the Kiefer-Hablitzel Foundation in Lucerne, Switzerland together with his wife Mathilde (née Hablitzel). Kiefer-Hablitzel formerly was the principal shareholder and board member of Banco do Brasil and held various interests, primarily in the steel and textile industry in Brazil.

== Early life and education ==
Karl Anton Kiefer was born May 17, 1872, in Basel, Switzerland. He was the son of a tailor formerly of the Grand Duchy of Baden, who naturalized as a Swiss citizen in 1868. Following his formal education in a trade school, he completed a commercial apprenticeship at Bank Heusser & Cie.

== Career ==
Then was employed in several companies in Basel until he decided to emigrate to France and England in 1884. After trying to establish his own company in Brussels, which ultimately failed, he decided to restart overseas. In 1900, Kiefer arrived in Rio de Janeiro, and changed his name to Antoine Charles, since the Brazilian upper class spoke French at the time. Initially, he was the representative of Ciba-Geigy in Brazil. Over the years, Kiefer amassed several participations in Brazilian companies, hotels and manganese mines. During World War I, he was a supplier of the armament industry. Further, he launched the silk manufacturing industry in Brazil and became a successful manufacturer of silk ribbons. He was a substantial part of the development of the textile industry in the country. In the 1920s, he was introduced to the Vogt brothers, also of Switzerland, who recently came to Brazil to seek industrial participations. Through this alliance, Companhia Fábrica de Botões e Artefatos de Metal, was handed over to Guido E. Vogt (1901-1939).

In his later years, he focussed in banking and philanthropic activities . He and his wife, were principal shareholders of Banco do Brazil, the oldest and second largest banking institution in Latin America. His philanthropic work also started in Brazil. His wife was the founder of an orphanage and a small charity hospital. Kiefer-Hablitzel was active in the Société Philanthrophique Suisse, an organization which provided endowments for Swiss emigrants in need.

== Personal life ==
Kiefer met his wife Mathilde Hablitzel during a visit in his homeland in 1901. They married in 1902 and had no children. Since 1923, they were residents of the Dreilinden Estate in Lucerne. He purchased the property in 1922 for 1 Million Swiss Francs.

== Literature ==
- Luzerner neueste Nachrichten, Luzern vom 19. August 1947 (in German)
- Karl Bühlmann: Charles und Mathilde auf Dreilinden. Die Gründung und Geschichte der Kiefer Hablitzel Stiftung. Luzern im Wandel der Zeiten, neue Folge. H. 10. Kommissionsverlag Raeber, Luzern 2003. (in German)
- Karl Bühlmann (Hrsg.): Kultur- und Kongresszentrum Luzern. Die Geschichte seines Werdens, die Zukunft seiner Idee. Zürcher Druck und Verlag, Rotkreuz 1998. (in German)
- Lisbeth Marfurt-Elmiger: Die Luzerner Kunstgesellschaft 1819-1933: Von der Gründung bis zur Eröffnung des Kunsthauses (= Beiträge zur Luzerner Stadtgeschichte, Bd. 4). Publikation des Stadtarchivs Luzern. Keller, Luzern 1978. (in German)
- Beat Mugglin: Die Bodenpolitik der Stadt Luzern (= Beiträge zur Luzerner Stadtgeschichte, Bd. 9). Publikation des Stadtarchivs Luzern. Kommissionsverlag Raeber, Luzern 1993. (in German)
