= Gotthold Schwarz =

German opera singer and conductor

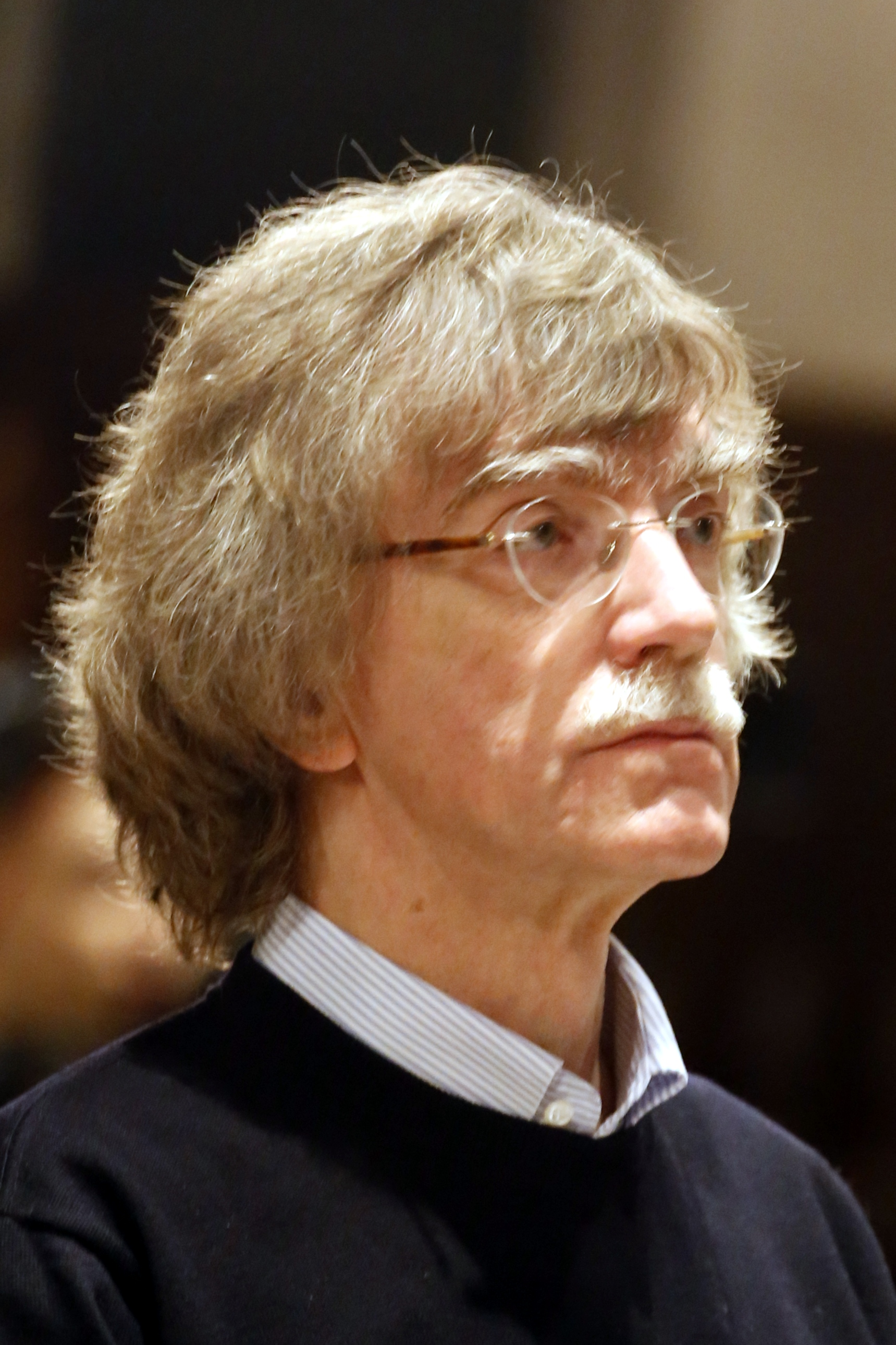
- Born: 2 May 1952 (age 73); Zwickau, East Germany
- Occupations: Bass-baritone; Conductor; Thomaskantor
- Organizations: Thomanerchor; Gewandhausorchester

Gotthold Schwarz (born 2 May 1952) is a German Bass-baritone and conductor. Based in Leipzig, he started as a member of the Thomanerchor and has conducted the Gewandhausorchester. Between 2016 and 2021, he was the 17th Thomaskantor after Johann Sebastian Bach.

== Biography ==
Schwarz was born in Zwickau on 2 May 1952 in Zwickau, the son of the cantor of St. Paul Church in Zwickau, which gave him an early contact with music. He began his musical career in 1964 as a member of the Thomanerchor, the boys' choir in Leipzig founded in 1212 and directed by Johann Sebastian Bach, among others, as the Thomaskantor. Schwarz has collaborated with the choir since in several functions. After completion of a church music education at the College of Church Music in Dresden, he studied at the Hochschule für Musik "Felix Mendelssohn Bartholdy" in Leipzig, voice with Gerda Schriever, organ with Wolfgang Schetelich and Hannes Kästner, and conducting with Max Pommer and Hans-Joachim Rotzsch. Later he studied privately with Peter Schreier, Hermann Christian Polster and Helmuth Rilling.

After graduation, he worked as a cantatas and oratorio singer. In 1979 he was appointed by Hans-Joachim Rotzsch as vocal coach of the Thomanerchor, serving also as a deputy and interim cantor in 1992, 1999 and 2002/03. In 2011, he served as an interim conductor for Georg Christoph Biller. Schwarz sang with conductors such as John Eliot Gardiner, Philippe Herreweghe, Peter Schreier, Martin Haselböck, and with ensembles including the Gewandhausorchester and the Dresdner Kreuzchor. He has performed at the Salzburg Festival, the Vienna Musikverein, and in the US, Finland and Japan. He recorded several Bach cantatas with Gardiner as part of the Bach Cantata Pilgrimage. With the Thomanerchor, conducted by Biller, he recorded Bach's cantatas Es erhub sich ein Streit, BWV 19, Gott der Herr ist Sonn und Schild, BWV 79, and Ein feste Burg ist unser Gott, BWV 80, the Mass in B minor and the Vox Christi in the St John Passion. He recorded Bach's solo cantatas for bass BWV 56, 82, and 158 with the Thomanerchor, conducted by Michael Schneider and his orchestra La Stagione.

Increasingly, Schwarz has appeared as a conductor. He founded his own ensembles Concerto Vocale Leipzig in 1984 and the Sächsisches Barockorchester (Saxon Baroque Orchestra) in 1990. As a guest conductor he worked with the choir and orchestra of the Gewandhaus. In 1993, he founded with gambist Siegfried Pank and organist Hans Christoph Becker-Foss a baroque trio in order to perform mostly music of the Bach family, but also other Baroque music.

Schwarz has been a teacher at the Hochschule für Musik "Felix Mendelssohn Bartholdy" since 1986. He was a juror of the International Johann Sebastian Bach Competition in 2004. He resides in Leipzig.

On 9 June 2016 he was selected as Thomaskantor in a term lasting until 2021. His successor was Andreas Reize.
