= Hans Becker-Foss =

German conductor (born 1949)

Hans Christoph Becker-Foss (born 1949 in Höxter) is a German conductor, organist and harpsichordist and professor at the Hochschule für Musik und Theater Hannover.

== Biography ==
Becker-Foss studied church music in Bremen. From 1973 to 1979 he was director of the Hastedter Kantorei in Bremen. Since 1993 he has been director of the Göttinger Vokalensemble. With the NDR Radiophilharmonie and the NDR Sinfonieorchester, Jenaer Philharmonie, the Staatsorchester Rheinische Philharmonie Koblenz, the Prague Symphony Orchestra, the Folkwang Kammerorchester Essen among others.

Becker-Foss has contributed to many performances of Schubert, Mendelssohn, Schumann, Brahms and Mahler and has conducted the Capella Classica in works of Mozart, Beethoven, Haydn and Schubert. Since 1980 he has been a lecturer of organ and early music at the Hochschule für Musik und Theater Hannover, appointed professor in 1993. Essentially a specialist for Baroque organ music, he has performed the works of Dieterich Buxtehude, Couperin and Bach. He is a recipient of the Preis der deutschen Schallplattenkritik in 2001.
