= Lapis alectorius =

A lapis alectorius, alectoria, alectorius, cock stone or capon stone is a non-precious stone found in the gizzard of capons (young, castrated roosters). In magic it is believed to be an amulet, granting the wearer a heightened sense of courage and boldness. These properties are unproven according to modern science.
