= Thomanerchor =

Boys' choir in Leipzig

- Choir
- Origin: Leipzig, Germany
- Founded: 1212; 814 years ago
- Genre: Choral, classical
- Music director: Andreas Reize
- Affiliation: St. Thomas Church, Leipzig
- Website: www.thomanerchor.de

The Thomanerchor (English: St. Thomas Choir of Leipzig) is a boys' choir in Leipzig, Germany. The choir was founded in 1212. The choir comprises about 90 boys from 9 to 18 years of age. The members, called Thomaner, reside in a boarding school, the Thomasalumnat and attend the St. Thomas School, Leipzig, a Gymnasium school with a linguistic profile and a focus on musical education. The younger members attend the primary school Grundschule Forum Thomanum or Anna-Magdalena-Bach-Schule. Johann Sebastian Bach served as Thomaskantor, director of the choir and church music in Leipzig, from 1723 to 1750.

== The choir ==
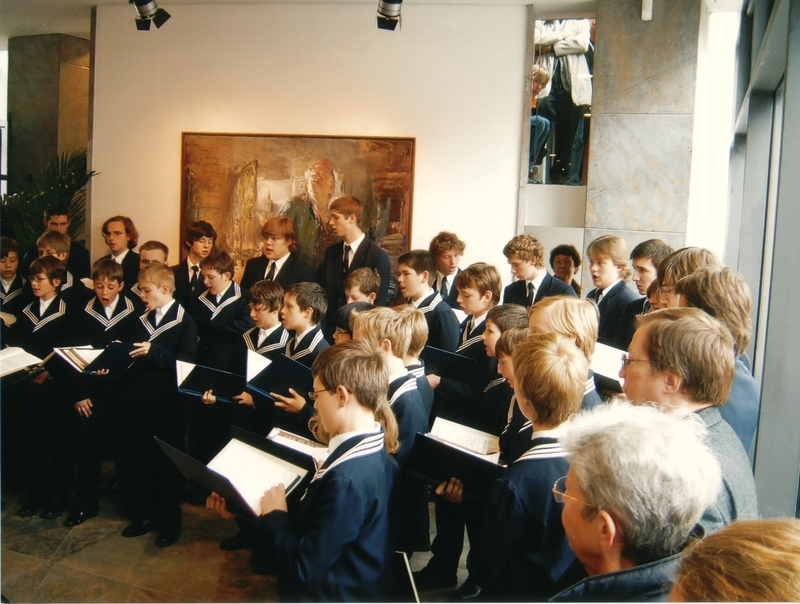
The choir singing at the Bach House in Eisenach on 17 May 2007

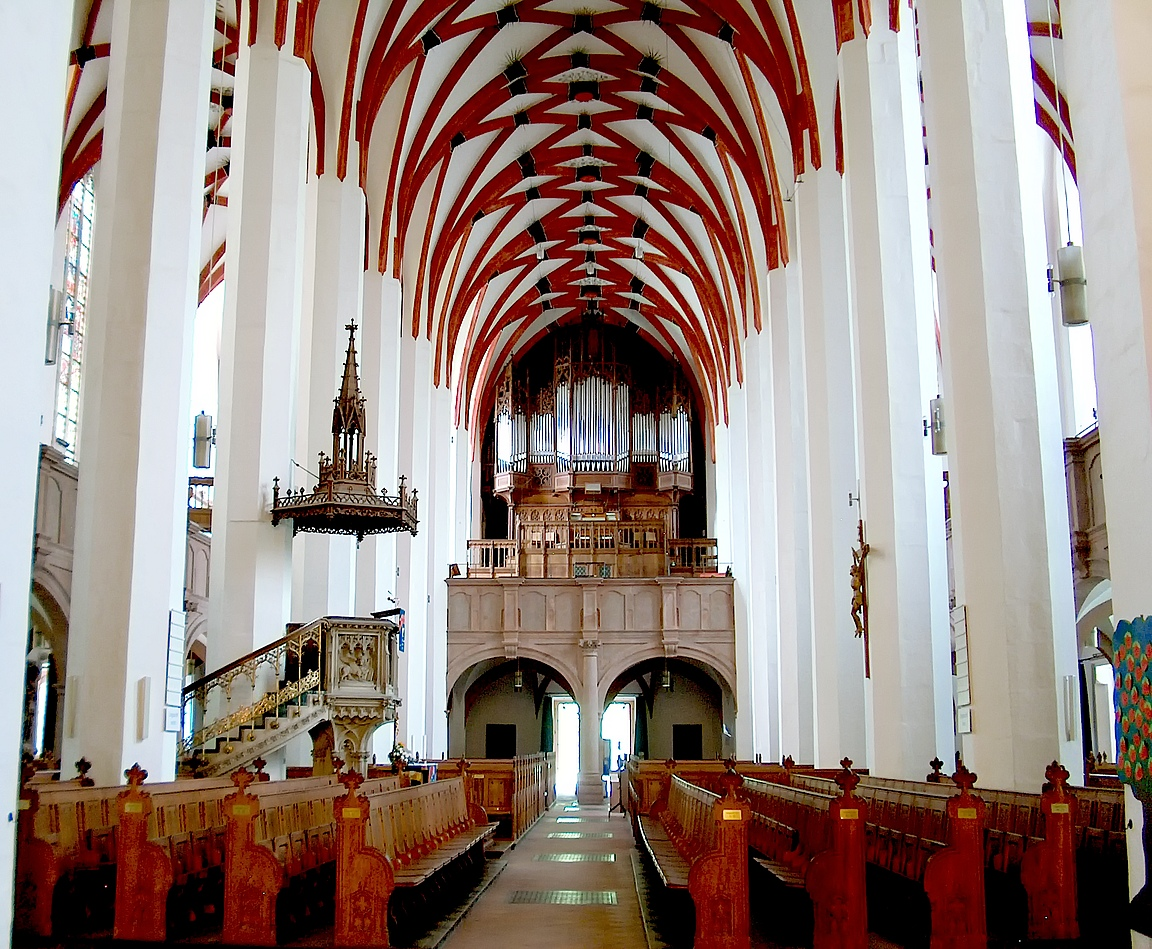
Thomaskirche, 2008

Although the choir's main musical field traditionally consists of the vocal works of Johann Sebastian Bach, the repertoire comprises pieces from different eras, from the Renaissance to contemporary music. Andreas Reize is the 18th Thomaskantor since Bach.

The Forum Thomanum is the campus of the choir in the Bach quarter of Leipzig. It was inaugurated in 2012 and includes the Thomasalumnat (boarding school), kindergarten, primary school, high school, choir rehearsal space, Luther Church, youth hostel, administration buildings, gym, a rehearsal hall and more amenities. Some critics contend that the Forum Thomanum project will change the way that the Thomaner are instructed and recruited.

Most of the members of the Thomanerchor live in the Thomasalumnat on Hiller Street. The boys are separated into so-called Stuben rather than school classes. Each Stube is not only a sleeping room, but also an administrative entity with a closed hierarchy and a clear assignment of tasks. One or more older choir boys live with the younger ones in each Stube in order to create a hierarchy and didactic relationship. Hence, the upbringing in the Thomanerchor is provided primarily by the older members, and the educators play a smaller role. Therefore, it is possible to have 90 boys living under one roof, supervised by only five educators. The Stuben are redistributed every year in order to maintain the age groupings and also to influence the social order in the Stube.

The Stuben have only lockable wardrobes (Köte) and one table for each boy. The rooms also have other furnishings, namely shelves for books, newspapers and satchels, radios, plants and chairs. Televisions and computers are not allowed. Each Stube consists of at least four rooms and a washroom with two showers, and each room has two to three beds.

The Thomasalumnat also has a gym, a rehearsal hall, and a dining hall where all boys eat together three times a day, a shop where the tailor sews the boys' suits for the concerts, an archive, a wing of the building for the teachers who live there, a room for the band, a model railway room, a fitness room, a living room for the older boys, a "press room" for the school's newspaper, a sauna, a library with computers and internet, an infirmary, and a television room. Communal restrooms are located on the hallway of each Stube.

The Thomanerchor gives concerts across Germany (at least two major tours a year) and abroad. The choir also sings three times a week in the Thomaskirche, "Motette" every Friday evening at 6 and every Saturday afternoon at 3, service on Sundays at 9 o'clock. The choir also sings at Protestant festivities. The children have vacations during the summer school vacations.

The tour of 2012, the choir's 800th year, presented a program of Alessandro Scarlatti's Exultate Deo, Kyrie and Gloria from Palestrina's Missa sine nomine, Bruckner's motets Vexilla regis and Christus factus est pro nobis, and Bach's motet Jesu, meine Freude. It was performed, for example, on 6 July in the Eberbach Abbey at the Rheingau Musik Festival.

== History ==
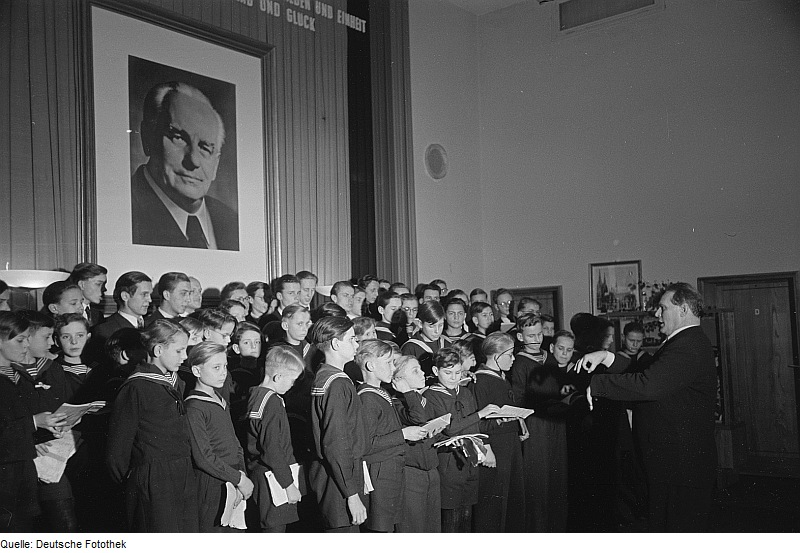
The choir in 1953

The Margrave of Meissen founded St. Thomas' priory for Augustinian Canons (Augustiner-Chorherrenstift zu St. Thomas) in 1212. A school was annexed to the monastery, the intended purpose of which was to develop future priests. Since the Reformation in 1539, the school and the choir have belonged to the city of Leipzig; it is also influenced by the Protestant Church of Saxony. This makes the Thomanerchor the oldest cultural entity in the city and one of the oldest in Europe; the Regensburger Domspatzen is the oldest known choir on record. When Johann Sebastian Bach served as director, the choir consisted of about 50 singers, of which the best 16 were used for performance of cantatas. After Bach's death, other famous musicians served as director, among them Doles, Hiller and Moritz Hauptmann.

By the end of the 19th century, the Thomasschule next to the Thomaskirche was demolished and the choir moved to the Hiller street, now the Leipziger "Music Quarter". During the Nazi era, the choir was incorporated into the Hitler Jugend in 1937, when Karl Straube was the Thomaskantor. But the Nazi government did not succeed in infiltrating their ideology into the choir's repertoire because his successor Günther Ramin concentrated on religious works. He also tried to prevent the boys from being enlisted as long as possible.

Georg Christoph Biller, who was a Thomaner himself in his youth, directed the choir from 1992 to 2015. After retiring for health reasons, he was succeeded by Gotthold Schwarz as interim cantor, the latter being officially appointed as the new Thomaskantor in June 2016. The 18th Thomaskantor after Bach is Andreas Reize.

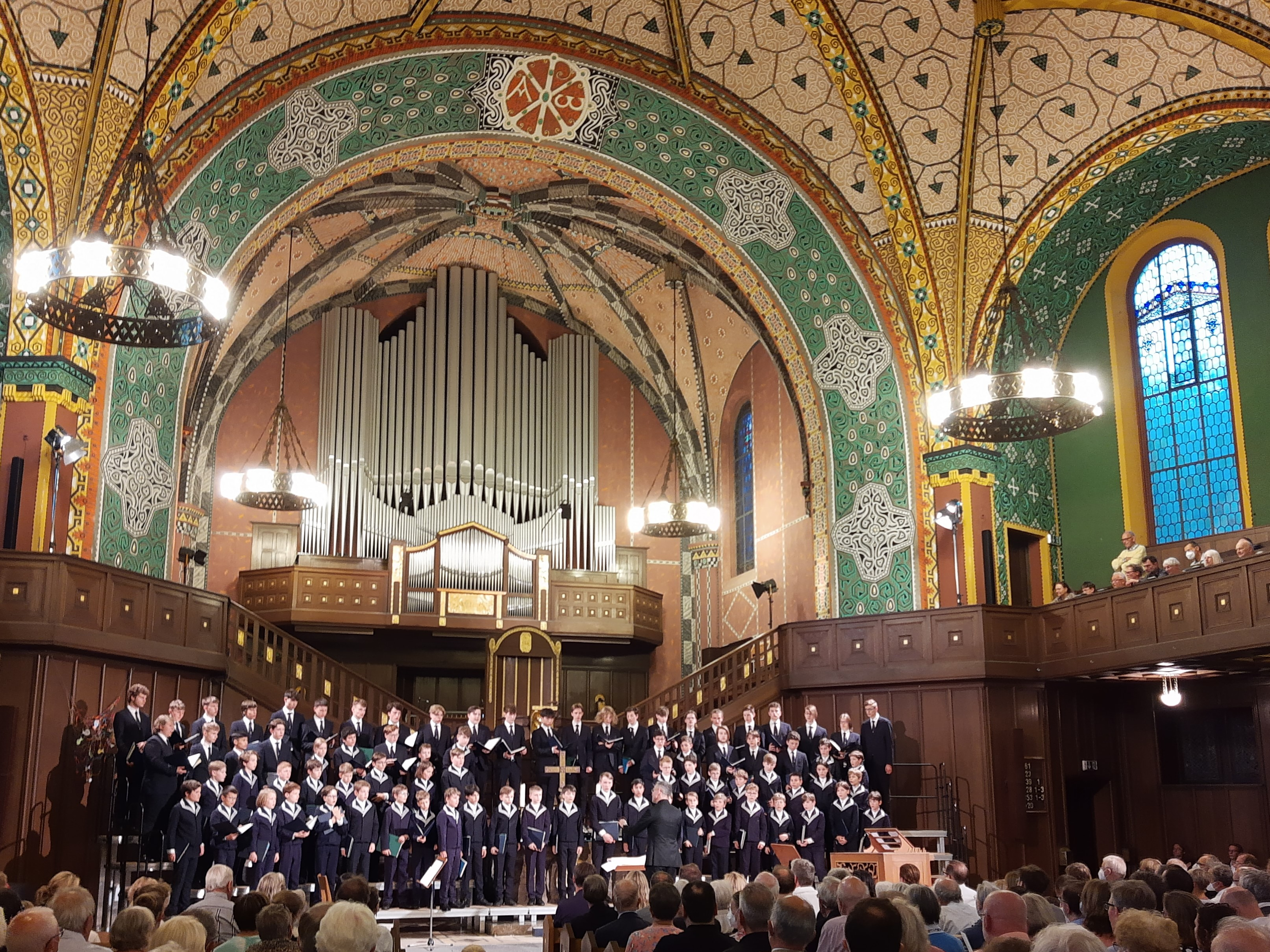
Thomanerchor at Lutherkirche, Wiesbaden, 2022

He resumed the traditional summer tours with a program called Salmo!, after the opening piece Salmo 150. It was presented at the Thomaskirche, and in Merseburg Cathedral among other places in Thuringia, and at the Lutherkirche in Wiesbaden as part of the Rheingau Musik Festival.

== Cantors ==
Cantors of the Thomanerchor, called Thomaskantor in German, have included (in brackets their time in the office):

- Georg Rhau (1518–1520)
- Johannes Galliculus (1520–1525)
- Sethus Calvisius (1594–1615)
- Johann Hermann Schein (1615–1630)
- Tobias Michael (1631–1657)
- Sebastian Knüpfer (1657–1676)
- Johann Schelle (1677–1701)
- Johann Kuhnau (1701–1722)
- Johann Sebastian Bach (1723–1750)
- Johann Friedrich Doles (1756–1789)
- Johann Adam Hiller (1789–1801)
- Johann Gottfried Schicht (1810–1823)
- Christian Theodor Weinlig (1823–1842)
- Moritz Hauptmann (1842–1868)
- Ernst Friedrich Richter (1868–1879)
- Wilhelm Rust (1880–1892)
- Gustav Schreck (1893–1918)
- Karl Straube (1918–1939)
- Günther Ramin (1939–1956)
- Kurt Thomas (1957–1960)
- Erhard Mauersberger (1961–1972)
- Hans-Joachim Rotzsch (1972–1991)
- Georg Christoph Biller (1992–2015)
- Gotthold Schwarz (2016–2021) (acting cantor 2015–2016)
- Andreas Reize (2021–)

== Notable members ==
- Carl Philipp Emanuel Bach
- Günther Ramin
- Diethard Hellmann
- Jörg-Peter Weigle
- Die Prinzen
- Hans-Jürgen Beyer
- Georg Christoph Biller
- Jürgen Golle
- Reiner Süß
- Erhard Mauersberger
- Martin Christian Vogel
- Amarcord
- Christoph Genz
- Hanns-Martin Schneidt
- Matthias Weichert
- David Timm
- Martin Petzold

== Films ==
- The Flying Classroom. Literal adaptation of Erich Kästner's novel The Flying Classroom. Germany 2003. Director: Tomy Wigand. OCLC 742197375
- 800 Years of Thomanerchor. Germany March 25, 2012, MDR Television (YouTube) OCLC 958003602
- Die Thomaner Documentary film. Germany March 2012. Directors: Paul Smaczny, Günter Atteln. OCLC 956369041

== Awards and recognition ==
Awards:

- 2023 Bach Medal
- 2014 Preis der Europäischen Kirchenmusik
- 2012 ECHO Classic Award, Special award
- 2011 Bach Prize of the Royal Academy of Music (London)
- 2002 Brahms Prize of the Brahms Society of Schleswig-Holstein (German: Brahms Preis)
- Europäischer Kulturpreis für Chormusik

State decorations:

- Fatherland's Order of Merit in Gold, of East Germany (German: Vaterländischer Verdienstorden)

Eponyms:

- 1924 The asteroid 1023 Thomana discovered by Karl Wilhelm Reinmuth was named after the boys' choir

== See also ==
- St. Thomas Church, Leipzig
- St. Thomas School, Leipzig

== Bibliography ==
- Horst List: Aus der Geschichte des Thomanerchores. Thomanerchor, Leipzig 1953.
- Lenka von Koerber: Wir singen Bach. Der Thomanerchor und seine Kantoren. Urania-Verlag, Berlin 1954.
- Horst List: Auf Konzertreise. Ein Buch von den Reisen des Leipziger Thomanerchores. Reich, Hamburg-Bergstedt 1957.
- Richard Petzoldt: Der Leipziger Thomanerchor. Edition Leipzig, Leipzig 1962.
- Bernhard Knick: St. Thomas zu Leipzig. Schule und Chor. Stätte des Wirkens von Johann Sebastian Bach. Bilder und Dokumente zur Geschichte der Thomasschule und des Thomanerchores mit ihren zeitgeschichtlichen Beziehungen. Mit einer Einführung von Manfred Mezger. Breitkopf & Härtel, Wiesbaden 1963.
- Hans-Jochim Rothe: Thomanerchor zu Leipzig, Deutsche Demokratische Republik. Thomanerchor, Leipzig 1968.
- Horst List: Der Thomanerchor zu Leipzig. Deutscher Verlag für Musik, Leipzig 1975.
- Armin Schneiderheinze: Der Thomanerchor zu Leipzig. Thomanerchor, Leipzig 1982.
- Wolfgang Hanke: Die Thomaner. Union-Verlag, Berlin 1985.
- Stefan Altner, Roland Weise: Thomanerchor Leipzig. Almanach 1. 1996. ISBN 978-3-9804313-1-6
- Gunter Hempel: Episoden um die Thomaskirche und die Thomaner. Tauchaer Verlag, Taucha 1997. ISBN 978-3-910074-67-5
- Michael Fuchs: Methoden der Frühdiagnostik des Eintrittszeitpunktes der Mutation bei Knabenstimmen. Untersuchungen bei Sängern des Thomanerchores Leipzig. 1997
- Stefan Altner: Thomanerchor und Thomaskirche. Historisches und Gegenwärtiges in Bildern. Tauchaer Verlag, Taucha 1998. ISBN 978-3-910074-84-2
- Georg Christoph Biller, Stefan Altner: Thomaneralmanach 4. Beiträge zur Geschichte und Gegenwart des Thomanerchors. Passage-Verlag, Leipzig 2000. ISBN 978-3-932900-33-4
- Gert Mothes, Siegfried Stadler: Die Thomaner. Passage-Verlag, Leipzig 2004. ISBN 978-3-932900-91-4
- Stefan Altner: Das Thomaskantorat im 19. Jahrhundert. Bewerber und Kandidaten für das Leipziger Thomaskantorat in den Jahren 1842 bis 1918. Quellenstudien zur Entwicklung des Thomaskantorats und des Thomanerchors vom Wegfall der öffentlichen Singumgänge 1837 bis zur ersten Auslandsreise 1920. Passage-Verlag, Leipzig 2006. ISBN 978-3-938543-15-3
- Helga Mauersberger (ed.): Dresdner Kreuzchor und Thomanerchor Leipzig. Zwei Kantoren und ihre Zeit. Rudolf und Erhard Mauersberger. Druck- und Verlagsgesellschaft Marienberg, Marienberg 2007. ISBN 978-3-931770-46-4
- Michael Maul, Dero berühmbter Chor – Die Leipziger Thomasschule und ihre Kantoren 1212–1804 Lehmstedt Verlag, Leipzig 2012. ISBN 978-3-942473-24-8
- Corinna Wörner: Zwischen Anpassung und Resistenz. Der Thomanerchor Leipzig in zwei politischen Systemen. Studien und Materialien zur Musikwissenschaft, 123. Georg Olms Verlag, Hildesheim, Baden Baden 2023, ISBN 978-3-487-16232-4 (Abstract)
- Corinna Wörner:Zwischen Kulturpflege und Kulturpropaganda – Thomaner- und Kreuzchor als Kulturbotschafter der DDR, in: Ritter, Rüdiger (Hg.): Musik und ihre gesellschaftliche Bedeutung in den staats- und postsozialistischen Ländern Mittel- und Osteuropas seit 1945, (Ostmitteleuropa interdisziplinär, Bd. 3), Wiesbaden 2023, p. 217–235, ISBN 978-3-447-12113-2.
