= Magdeburger Telemann-Festtage =

German music festival

The Magdeburg Telemann Festival, first held in 1962 (64 years ago), has been held biennially in Magdeburg since 1990 (36 years ago) in honour of Georg Philipp Telemann, usually around Telemann's birthday, 14 March.

The first Magdeburg Telemann Festival days were organized 1962, 1965, 1967, 1970, 1973, 1977, 1981, 1984, 1987, primarily under the Cultural Association of the GDR.

The 20th Magdeburger Telemann-Festtage in 2010 welcomed conductors associated with the revival of interest in Telemann's music including Reinhard Goebel, Hermann Max, Ludger Rémy, Michael Schneider, Gotthold Schwarz, as well as baritone Klaus Mertens, and gambist Hille Perl.
