= Johannes Galliculus =

German music theorist and composer

Johannes Galliculus (Alectorius, Hähnel, Hennel; c. 1490 in Dresden – c. 1550 in Leipzig) was a German music theorist and composer.

He was active ca. 1520 in Leipzig. He was the cantor of the Thomanerchor from 1520 to 1525.

== Works ==
Editions: Johannes Galliculus: Gesamtausgabe der Werke, ed. A.A. Moorefield, Gesamtausgaben, viii (Brooklyn, NY, 1975–)

- Passio Domino nostri Jesu Christi, 4vv, 1538
- Mass Christ ist erstanden 4vv, 1539
- Aliud officium Paschale, 4vv, 1539
- Proprium mass for Christmas, 4vv, 1545
- Magnificat quarti toni, 4vv,
- Magnificat quinti toni, 4vv
- Magnificat septimi toni, 4vv
- Motets, 4vv:
  - Apparuit benignitas, 4vv
  - Ave vivens, hostie
  - Cavete a scribis
  - Christus resurgens
  - Duo homines ascenderunt
  - Immunem semper
  - In cathedra Moysi
  - In natali
  - Non ex operibus
  - Venite post me
- Psalm. Quare fremuerunt gentes, 4vv

=== Doubtful works ===
- Enlive psallant;
- Joseph, lieber Joseph, mein

=== Theorical works ===
- Isagoge de compositione cantus
