= List of Leipzig University people =

The following is a list of notable alumni and faculty of the University of Leipzig.

== Notable alumni ==
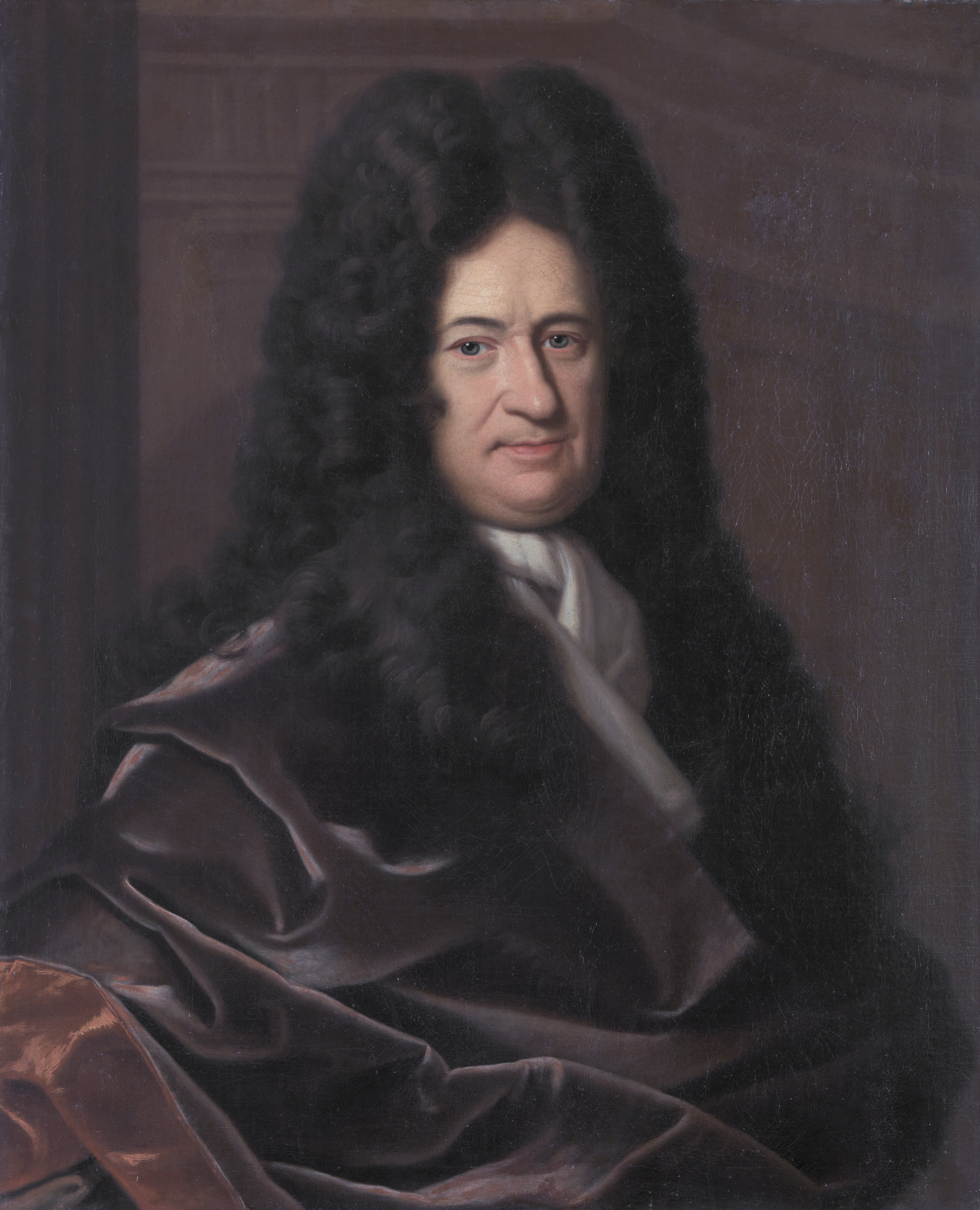
Gottfried Leibniz

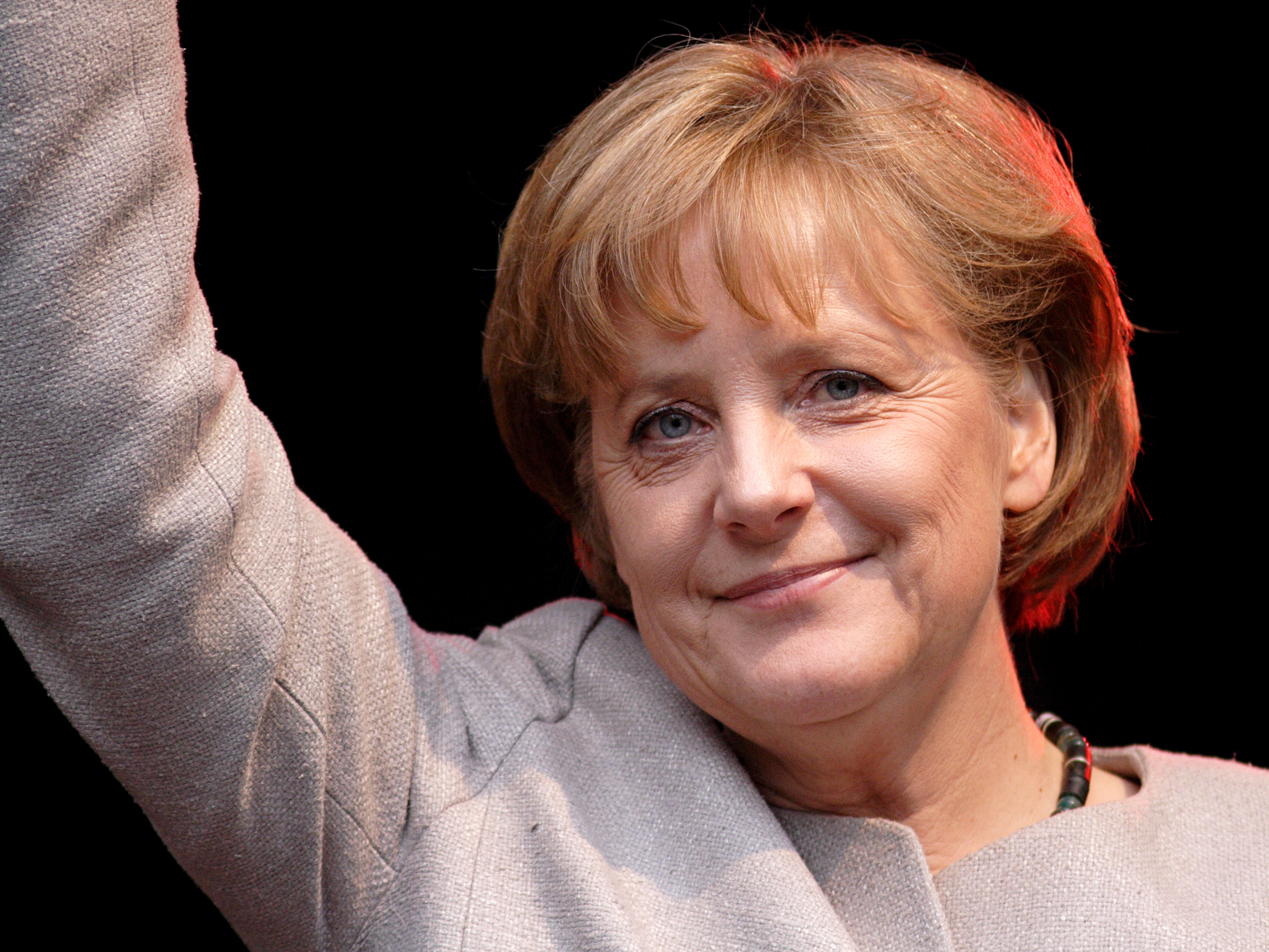
Angela Merkel

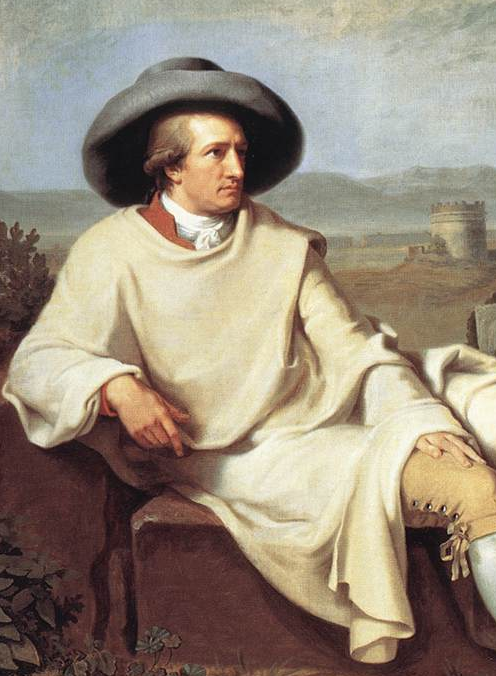
Johann Wolfgang von Goethe

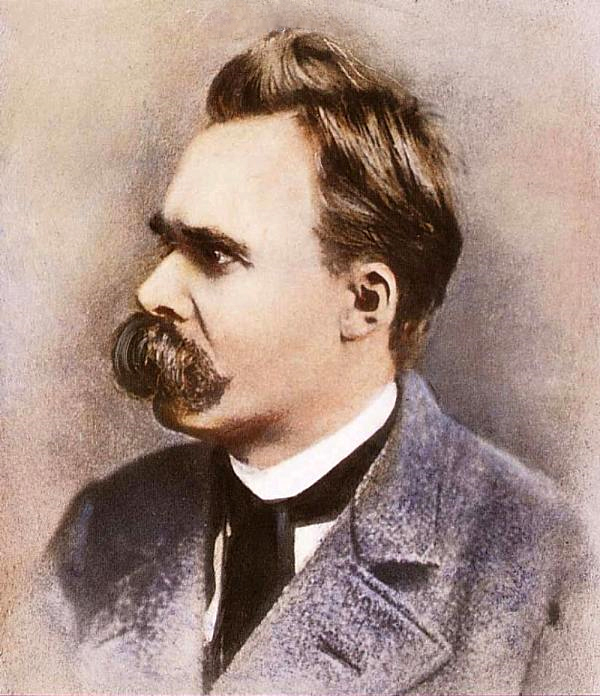
Friedrich Nietzsche

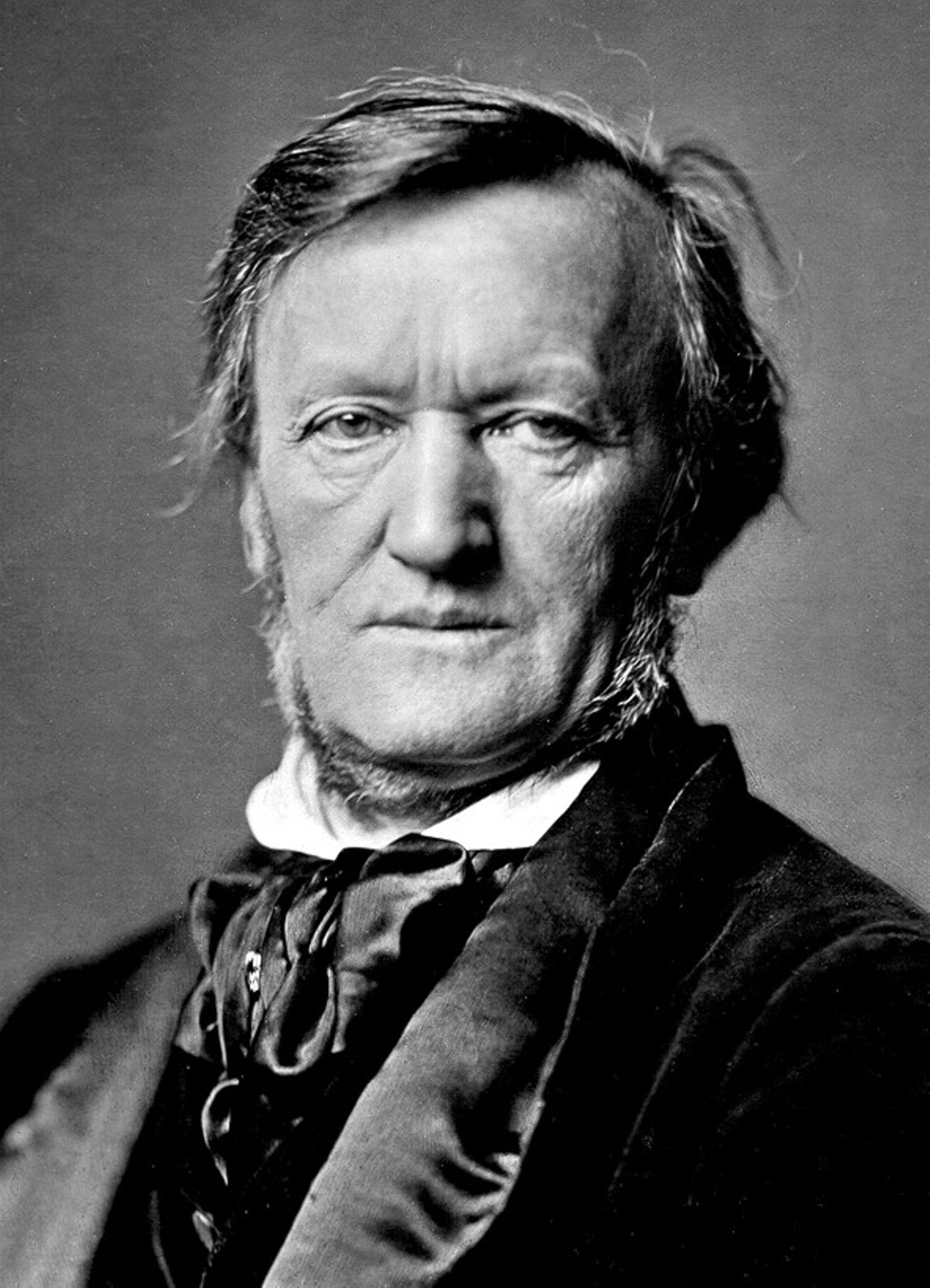
Richard Wagner

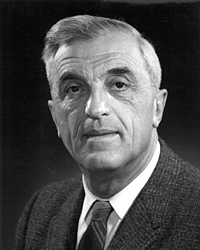
Felix Bloch

- Theodore Dyke Acland, English physician
- Georgius Agricola, Saxon mining engineer and natural philosopher
- Joseph L. Armstrong, American scholar
- Jan Niecisław Baudouin de Courtenay, Polish linguist and slavist
- Kamuran Alî Bedirxan, Kurdish politician and writer
- Lothar Bisky, German politician
- Felix Bloch, Swiss physicist, Nobel Prize in Physics
- Marc Bloch, French historian
- John Bohnius, German physician
- Hjalmar Hjorth Boyesen, American writer and scholar
- Tycho Brahe, Danish astronomer
- Sylvia Bretschneider (1960-2019), politician, member and speaker of the state assembly (Landtag) of Mecklenburg-Vorpommern
- Selig Brodetsky, President of the Hebrew University of Jerusalem
- Cai Yuanpei, Chinese linguist
- James McKeen Cattell, American psychologist
- Wei-Liang Chow, Chinese mathematician and stamp collector born in Shanghai, known for his work in algebraic geometry.
- Constantine I, Greek monarch
- William David Coolidge, American physicist
- Karl Ludwig Drobisch (1803–1854), German composer, music theorist and church musician
- Georg Dohrn, German conductor
- Carl H. Dorner, American politician
- Ernst Christoph Dressler, German composer and music theorist
- Émile Durkheim, French sociologist
- Friedrich Adolf Ebert, Saxon librarian
- Nishith Gupta, molecular biologist
- Johann Arnold Ebert, Saxon writer and translator
- Wilhelm Ehmann, musicologist, conductor, founder and director of the Herford School of Church Music
- Ephraim Emerton, American medievalist historian
- Gustav Fechner, German psychologist
- Wilhelm Fuchs (1898–1947), Nazi SS officer and Holocaust perpetrator executed for war crimes
- Arnold Gehlen, German philosopher and sociologist
- Hans-Dietrich Genscher, German politician
- Kurt Albert Gerlach, German sociologist
- Johann Wolfgang Goethe, German poet
- Woldemar Ludwig Grenser, German obstetrician
- Otto von Guericke, German scientist and politician
- Gotthard Günther, German-American philosopher
- Samuel Hahnemann, founder of homeopathy
- Edith Hamilton, American essayist and educator; first female student at the university together with her sister Alice
- Albert Hauck, German theologian and church historian
- Elsa Herrmann (1893–1957), Jewish German feminist writer and refugee advocate
- Johann Adam Hiller, Saxon composer
- Milton W. Humphreys, American scholar
- Adolf Hurwitz, German mathematician
- Edmund Husserl, Austrian philosopher and mathematician
- Ulrich von Hutten, Hessian humanist and political leader
- Nicolae Iorga, Romanian historian and politician
- Wolfgang Iser, German literary theorist
- Jan Jesenius, Slovak physician, politician and philosopher
- Tomas Garrigue Masaryk, founder and first president of Czechoslovakia, professor of sociology
- Uwe Johnson, German writer and translator
- Ernst Jünger, German novelist and nationalist activist
- Erich Kähler, German mathematician
- Erich Kästner, German satirist and children's writer
- Paul Kirchhoff, German anthropologist and ethnohistorian
- Johannes Knolleisen, German theologian
- Alexander Kohut, Hungarian-American rabbi and orientalist
- Ku Hung-ming, Malaysian-Chinese scholar
- Victor Lange, German-American linguist
- Georg Christian Lehms, German poet and novelist
- Gottfried Wilhelm Leibniz, German mathematician and philosopher
- August Leskien, German linguist
- Gotthold Ephraim Lessing, German philosopher and writer
- Rudolf Leuckart, German zoologist
- David Le Vita, American musician, musicologist, conductor and educator
- Karl Liebknecht, German communist activist
- Ulrike Liedtke (born 1958), musicologist and politician (SPD)
- Lin Yutang, Chinese novelist and inventor
- Virgil Madgearu, Romanian economist and sociologist
- Bronisław Malinowski, Polish anthropologist
- Sándor Márai, Hungarian poet and novelist
- Emil Mattiesen (1875–1939), composer, pianist and philosopher
- Thomas Mauksch, Lutheran pastor and naturalist
- Angela Merkel, German politician
- Walter Miller, American philologist
- Thomas Müntzer, Thuringian theologian and rebellion leader
- Mahoma Mwakipunda Mwaungulu, Malawian politician and freedom fighter
- Carl Friedrich Naumann, German mineralogist and geologist
- Friedrich Nietzsche, German philosopher
- Novalis, German writer and philosopher
- Otto Ohlendorf (1907–1951), SS general and Holocaust perpetrator, executed for war crimes
- James Morris Page (1864–1936), American mathematician and chairman of University of Virginia
- George Pardee, American physician and politician
- Lucrețiu Pătrășcanu, Romanian Marxist sociologist and politician
- James Phelan, Jr., American politician
- Samuel Pufendorf, German jurist and historian
- Jeff Radebe African politician and cabinet member
- Alexander Radishchev, Russian political thinker
- Constantin Rădulescu-Motru, Romanian psychologist and philosopher
- Hermann Raster, German-American journalist and political figure
- Augustus Quirinus Rivinus (1827–1891), German botanist and physician
- Ferdinand de Saussure, Swiss linguist
- Hans Ulrich von Schaffgotsch, Silesian nobleman and general
- Ludwig Scheeffer, German mathematician
- Helmut Schelsky, German sociologist
- Hans-Joachim Schulze, German Bach scholar
- Kurt Schumacher, German politician
- Robert Schumann (1810–1856), German Romantic composer
- Georg Philipp Telemann (1681-1767), German Baroque composer
- Christoph Graupner (1683-1760), German Baroque composer
- Edward Teller, Hungarian-American nuclear physicist
- Galsan Tschinag, Mongolian writer, poet and activist
- Kārlis Ulmanis, Latvian politician
- Dimitri Uznadze, Georgian psychologist
- Richard Wagner (1813-1883), German Romantic composer
- Ernst Heinrich Weber, German physician
- Carl Friedrich von Weizsäcker, German physicist and philosopher
- Gustav Zeuner, German physicist and engineer
- Caspar Ziegler, jurist

== Notable faculty ==
- Ernst Bloch, philosopher
- Felix Bloch, physicist, winner of the Nobel Prize in Physics in 1952
- Ludwig Boltzmann, Professor of Physics
- Karl Brugmann, comparative linguist
- Karl Bücher, economist
- Ernst Adolf Coccius, ophthalmologist
- Peter Debye, physicist, 1927-1936 Director of the Physics Institute, winner of the Nobel Prize in Chemistry in 1936
- Adolf Ebert, Romance philologist
- Gustav Fechner, psychologist
- Paul Flechsig, neurologist
- Hans Freyer, sociologist
- Christian Fürchtegott Gellert, theologian and poet
- Ludwig Wilhelm Gilbert, publisher of the Annalen der Physik
- Rudolf Gottschall, critic, poet and dramatist
- Johann Christoph Gottsched, philologist
- Samuel Hahnemann, physician and lecturer at medical faculty 1812-21
- Werner Heisenberg, physicist, 1927–1942; Professor of Theoretical Physics; winner of the Nobel Prize in Physics in 1932
- Gustav Ludwig Hertz, physicist, 1954–1961; Head of the Physics Institute; winner of the Nobel Prize in Physics in 1925, together with James Franck
- Gert Jäger, Slavist and translation scholar; member of the Leipzig School
- Otto Kade, specialist in Russian language and translation scholar; member of the Leipzig School
- Felix Klein, mathematician
- Werner Krauss, Romanist
- Karl Lamprecht, historian
- August Leskien, linguist
- Julius Edgar Lilienfeld, inventor of the transistor
- Wilhelm Maurenbrecher, historian
- August Ferdinand Möbius, astronomer and mathematician
- Theodor Mommsen, historian, 1848-1851 Professor of Law; Nobel Prize in Literature in 1902 for The History of Rome
- Petrus Mosellanus, Greek scholar
- Albrecht Neubert, lecturer in English language and translation scholar; member of the Leipzig School
- Wilhelm Ostwald, chemist; 1887-1906 Chair of Physical Chemistry; Nobel Prize in Chemistry in 1909
- Svante Pääbo, Nobel Prize in Medicine, currently teaches molecular evolutionary biology at the university
- Martin Petzoldt, systematic theology; president of the Neue Bachgesellschaft
- Arthur Prüfer, musicologist
- Augustus Quirinus Rivinus, botanist
- Wilhelm Roscher, economist
- Carl Victor Ryssel, theologian
- Heinrich Simroth, zoologist
- Nathan Söderblom, religious historian; Director of the Religious Studies Institute 1912–1914; Nobel Peace Prize in 1930
- Georg Steindorff, egyptologist
- Christian Thomasius, philosopher
- Sin-Itiro Tomonaga, physicist, winner of the Nobel Prize in Physics in 1965
- Wolfgang Unger, director of university music
- Bartel Leendert van der Waerden, mathematician
- Ernst Heinrich Weber, physician
- Georg Wildführ, microbiologist
- Peter Wollny, musicologist
- Wilhelm Wundt, physician, psychologist
- Paul Zweifel, physician, physiologist
- Christian Wolff, a German philosopher

== Universitätsmusikdirektor ==
Several persons held the official title of director of music at the university, some of them at the same time Thomaskantor, including:

- Friedrich Brandes
- Werner Fabricius
- Johann Gottlieb Görner
- Hermann Grabner
- Johann Georg Häser
- Johann Adam Hiller (Thomaskantor 1789–1800)
- Hermann Kretzschmar
- Johann Kuhnau (Thomaskantor 1701–1722)
- Hermann Langer
- August Pohlenz
- Max Pommer
- Friedrich Rabenschlag
- Max Reger
- Ernst Friedrich Richter (Thomaskantor 1868–1879)
- Hans-Joachim Rotzsch (Thomaskantor 1972–1991)
- Johann Schelle (Thomaskantor 1677–1701)
- Johann Gottfried Schicht (Thomaskantor 1811–1823)
- Friedrich Schneider
- Johann Philipp Christian Schulz
- David Timm
- Wolfgang Unger (Thomaskantor interim 1991–1992)
- Heinrich Zöllner
