= Leipziger Universitätsmusik =

Logo of the Leipziger Universitätsmusik, with the motto translating to "Music tradition in centuries"

Leipziger Universitätsmusik refers to music education and performance at the University of Leipzig. Music at the university dates back to its founding of the university in the 15th century. At present, Leipziger Universitätsmusik is the name of several musical ensembles formed by students and professors, and supported by professional musicians, the choir Leipziger Universitätschor, an orchestra, two smaller instrumental ensembles, and a big band.

== History ==
In 1410, the artistic faculty offered lectures on the Musica speculativa secundum Boethium written by Johannes de Muris in 1323, which were required for academic degrees baccalauréat and magister, alongside arithmetic, geometry, and astronomy, in the medieval Quadrivium.

In 1558, music education was discontinued in favour of physics, but new courses were offered for the training of musicians by the cantors of the Thomaskirche and Nikolaikirche. University music was then mostly church music. Its first director at the university church Paulinerkirche, with the title "director musices Paulini" (Universitätsmusikdirektor), was Werner Fabricius in 1656.

In the 17th century, instrumental ensembles by students were formed. Georg Philipp Telemann, then a law student, founded the collegium musicum in 1701, which was later directed by Johann Sebastian Bach. Bach composed twenty works for university occasions, Festmusiken zu Leipziger Universitätsfeiern (Music for festivities of the Leipzig University), of which twelve cantatas survived. A second collegium musicum was founded in 1708 by Johann Friedrich Fasch, also a law student. It was later conducted by Johann Gottlieb Görner. In 1979, Max Pommer founded the Neues Bachisches Collegium Musicum in this tradition. Lectures in music theory were held by Lorenz Christoph Mizler, while Christian Friedrich Michaelis (philosopher) taught aesthetics of music.

In 1802, the Leipziger Singakademie was founded, which was conducted by the Universitätsmusikdirektor from 1810 to 1848. They regularly performed oratorios. Choirs at the university included the 1822 Pauliner-Verein (from 1919: Universitäts-Sängerschaft St. Pauli), the 1850 Riedelverein and Bachverein, and the 1852 Studentengesangverein Arion (from 1907: Sängerschaft Arion).

After World War II, Friedrich Rabenschlag continued work with the Universitätschor, the Universitätskantorei and the chamber orchester in 1946. Horst Förster founded a collegium musicum in 1956, later called the Akademisches Orchester Leipzig. Hans Grüß founded a group at the museum for musical instruments in 1957, the Capella fidicinia, specialising in early music.

In 1968, the home of Leipzig's university music, the Paulinerkirche, was destroyed by the GDR regime. After German reunification, the present Leipziger Universitätsmusik was formed from 1992. Universitätsmusikdirektor Wolfgang Unger founded several ensembles. He was succeeded by David Timm. The new Paulinerkirche was inaugurated in 2017.

== Musical directors ==
Several of the musical directors (Universitätsmusikdirektor) were at the same time Thomaskantor. Friedrich Rabenschlag was the last one to use the title Universitätsmusikdirektor during the GDR time, but it was awarded again 1991 to Wolfgang Unger.

- 1656–1679: Werner Fabricius
- 1679–1701: Johann Schelle (Thomaskantor 1677–1701)
- 1701–1722: Johann Kuhnau (Thomaskantor 1701–1722)
- 1723–1778: Johann Gottlieb Görner
- 1778–1785: Johann Adam Hiller (Thomaskantor 1789–1800)
- 1785–1809: Johann Georg Häser
- 1808–1810: Johann Gottfried Schicht (Thomaskantor 1811–1823)
- 1810–1818: Friedrich Schneider
- 1818–1827: Johann Philipp Christian Schulz
- 1827–1843: Christian August Pohlenz
- 1843–1847: Ernst Friedrich Richter (Thomaskantor 1868–1879)
- 1847–1887: Hermann Langer
- 1887–1898: Hermann Kretzschmar
- 1898–1906: Heinrich Zöllner
- 1907–1908: Max Reger
- 1908–1930: Friedrich Brandes
- 1930–1939: Hermann Grabner
- 1939–1962: Friedrich Rabenschlag
- 1963–1973: Hans-Joachim Rotzsch (Thomaskantor 1972–1991)
- 1973–1987: Max Pommer
- 1987–2004: Wolfgang Unger (Thomaskantor interim 1991–1992)
- Since 2005: David Timm

== Ensembles ==
- Leipziger Universitätschor (founded in 1926 as Madrigalkreis Leipziger Studenten)
- Pauliner Kammerorchester (1992)
- Pauliner Barockensemble (1994)
- Leipziger Universitätsorchester (2003)
- Unibigband Leipzig (2006)

== Literature ==
- Eszter Fontana (ed.): 600 Jahre Musik an der Universität Leipzig. Studien anlässlich des Jubiläums. Stekovics, Wettin 2010, ISBN 978-3-89923-245-5.
