= Angenehmes Wiederau, BWV 30a =

Secular cantata by Johann Sebastian Bach

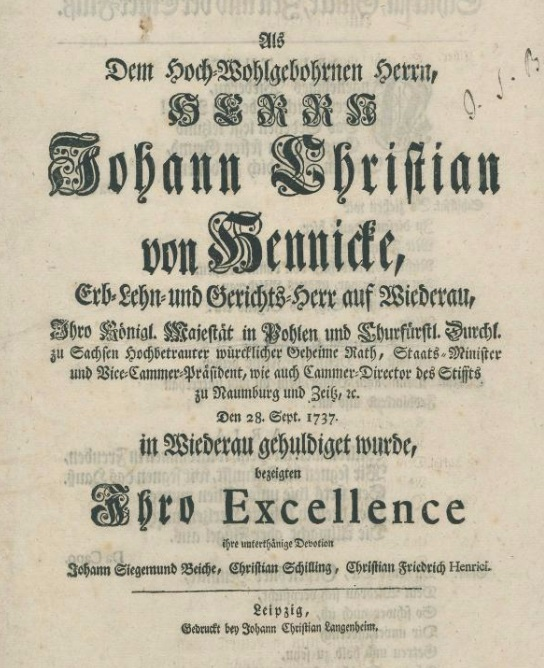
Title page of the printed libretto of Angenehmes Wiederau (1737).

Angenehmes Wiederau, freue dich in deinen Auen (Pleasant Wiederau, rejoice in thy meadows), BWV 30.1 (formerly BWV 30a), is a 1737 secular cantata by Johann Sebastian Bach, on a libretto by Christian Friedrich Henrici (Picander). Bach reused some of its music in later works, including Freue dich, erlöste Schar, BWV 30.2, one of his church cantatas, which was nearly entirely modelled after the secular composition.

== History and text ==
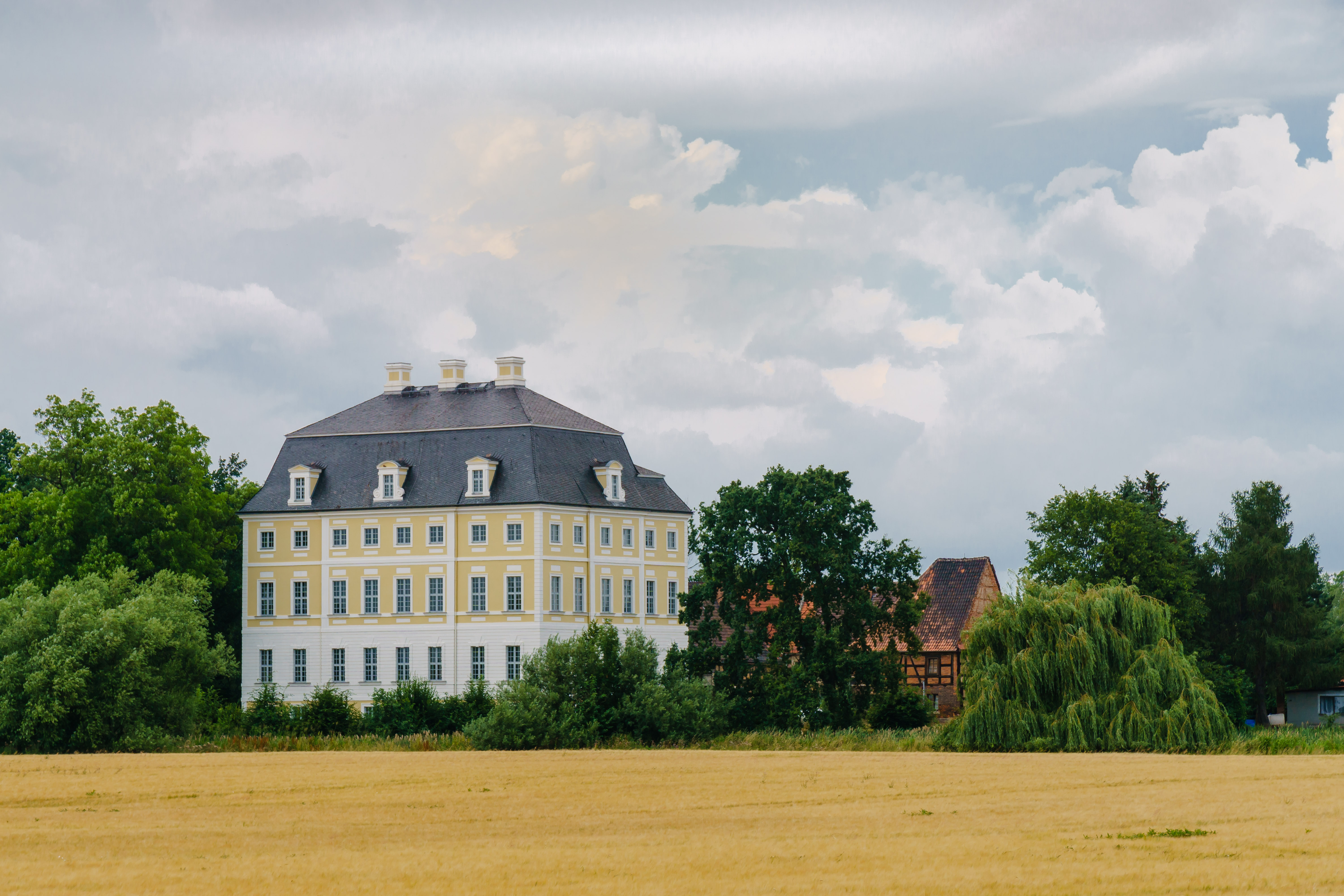
Wiederau manor

Angenehmes Wiederau was composed in Leipzig in 1737 by which time most of Bach's cantatas had already been completed. It was an homage to Johann Christian von Hennicke, who had acquired an estate at Wiederau in Pegau near Leipzig. The work was performed on 28 September at Hennicke's Wiederau manor.

The libretto of the cantata was written by Christian Friedrich Henrici (Picander), a frequent collaborator of the composer.

== Scoring and structure ==
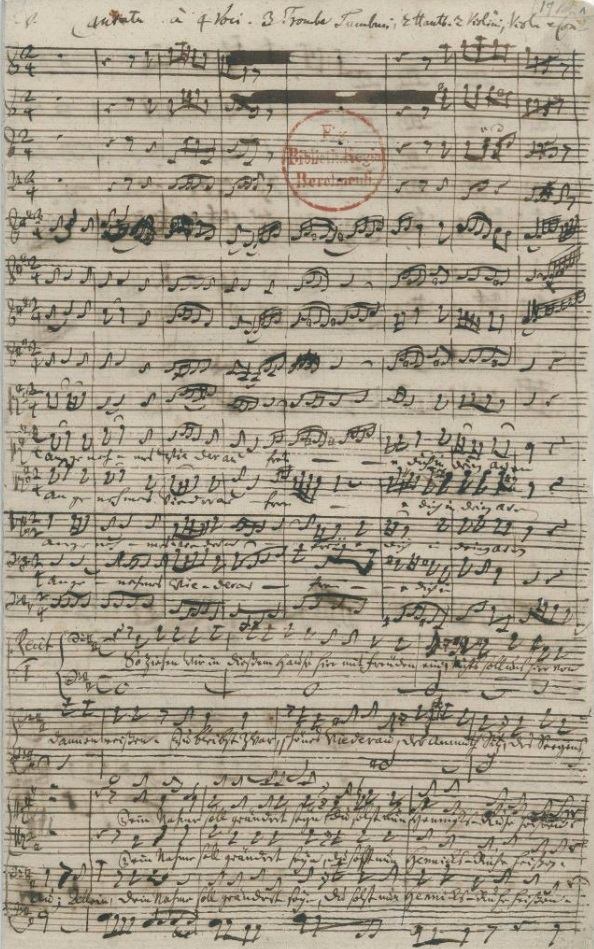
First page of Bach's autograph score of the cantata.

The piece is scored for basso continuo, along with four vocal soloists (soprano as Zeit (Time), alto as Glück (Good Fortune), tenor as Elster (River Elster), bass as Schicksal (Fate)) and four-part choir.

The cantata has thirteen movements:

1. Chorus: Angenehmes Wiederau
2. Recitative (bass, soprano, alto, tenor): So ziehen wir
3. Aria (bass): Willkommen im Heil, willkommen in Freuden
4. Recitative (alto): Da heute dir, gepriesner Hennicke
5. Aria (alto): Was die Seele kann ergötzen
6. Recitative (bass): Und wie ich jederzeit bedacht
7. Aria (bass): Ich will dich halten
8. Recitative (soprano): Und obwohl sonst der Unbestand
9. Aria (soprano): Eilt, ihr Stunden, wie ihr wollt
10. Recitative (tenor): So recht! ihr seid mir werte Gäste
11. Aria (tenor): So, wie ich die Tropfen zolle
12. Recitative (soprano, bass, alto): Drum, angenehmes Wiederau
13. Chorus: Angenehmes Wiederau

== Music ==
The eleventh movement, a tenor aria, is a reworking of a soprano aria from BWV 210. The other major movements were later reused in BWV 30.2, while the recitatives were newly composed.

== Recordings ==
- Amsterdam Baroque Orchestra & Choir; Ton Koopman. J.S. Bach: Complete Cantatas Vol. 22. Antoine Marchand
- Gächinger Kantorei, Bach-Collegium Stuttgart; Helmuth Rilling. Edition Bachakademie Vol. 139 – Congratulatory and Hommage Cantatas. Hänssler
- Leipziger Universitätschor, Neues Bachisches Collegium Musicum; Max Pommer. Kantate "Angenehmes Wiederau" BWV 30a. Eterna/Berlin Classic
- Les Chantres du Centre de Musique Baroque de Versailles/Café Zimmermann; Gustav Leonhardt. J.S. Bach: Weltliche Kantaten BWV 30a & 207 (Integrale delle Cantate profane Vol. 5). Alpha 118
- Bach Collegium Japan, Masaaki Suzuki. J. S. Bach: Secular Cantatas, Vol. 10. BIS, 2018.

== Sources ==
- Alfred Dürr: Johann Sebastian Bach: Die Kantaten. Bärenreiter, Kassel 1999, ISBN 3-7618-1476-3
- Alfred Dürr: The Cantatas of J.S. Bach, Oxford University Press, 2006. ISBN 0-19-929776-2
- Werner Neumann: Handbuch der Kantaten J.S.Bachs, 1947, 5th Ed. 1984, ISBN 3-7651-0054-4
- Hans-Joachim Schulze: Die Bach-Kantaten: Einführungen zu sämtlichen Kantaten Johann Sebastian Bachs. Leipzig: Evangelische Verlags-Anstalt; Stuttgart: Carus-Verlag 2006 (Edition Bach-Archiv Leipzig) ISBN 3-374-02390-8 (Evang. Verl.-Anst.), ISBN 3-89948-073-2 (Carus-Verlag)
- Christoph Wolff/Ton Koopman: Die Welt der Bach-Kantaten Verlag J.B. Metzler, Stuttgart, Weimar 2006 ISBN 978-3-476-02127-4
