= Die Zeit, die Tag und Jahre macht, BWV 134a =

Secular cantata by Johann Sebastian Bach

Die Zeit, die Tag und Jahre macht
- Serenata
- Secular cantata by J. S. Bach
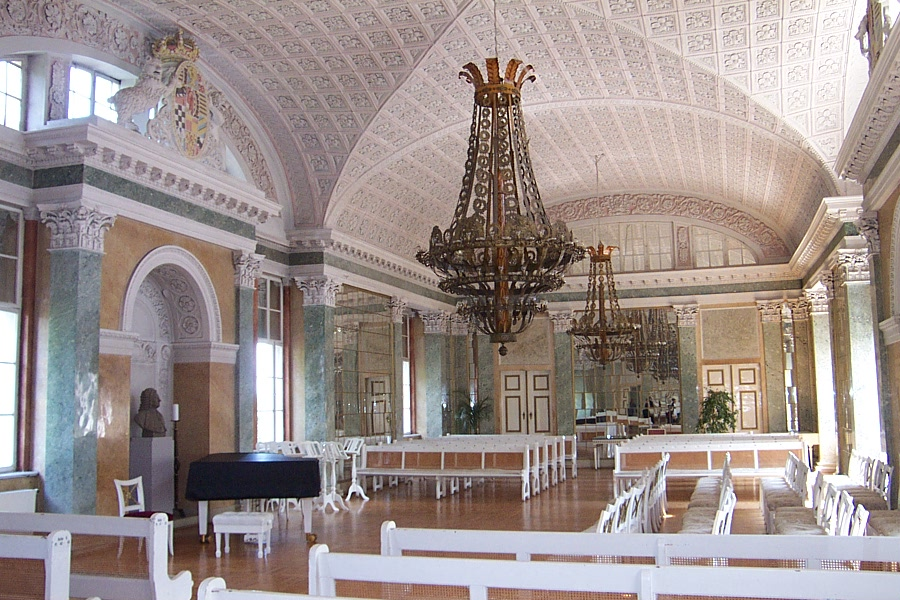
- Bachsaal at Schloss Köthen
- Catalogue: BWV 134.1; BWV 134a
- Related: basis for an Easter cantata, Ein Herz, das seinen Jesum lebend weiß
- Occasion: New Year's Day
- Text: by Christian Friedrich Hunold
- Performed: 1 January 1719: Köthen
- Movements: 8
- Vocal: solo: alto and tenor; SATB choir
- Instrumental: 2 oboes; 2 violins; viola; continuo

Johann Sebastian Bach composed the secular cantata Die Zeit, die Tag und Jahre macht (Time, which day and year doth make), BWV 134.1, BWV 134a, while he was in the service of the court of Leopold, Prince of Anhalt-Köthen. (Note: Some English references use the spelling "Cöthen", which was the German spelling in Bach's time, or also "Koethen".) Bach wrote the work as a serenata for the celebration of New Year's Day 1719.

The libretto by Christian Friedrich Hunold, an academic at the University of Halle, takes the form of a dialogue between two allegorical figures, Time and Divine Providence, representing the past and future, respectively. Bach set the words in eight movements consisting of alternating recitatives and arias, culminating in a choral finale. Most movements are duets of solo voices, an alto as Divine Providence and a tenor as Time. Even the closing movement features long duet passages, leading to parts for four voices. The singers are supported by a baroque instrumental ensemble of two oboes, two violins, viola and continuo. The character of the music is close to baroque opera, including French dances.

Later, in Leipzig, Bach used the secular cantata as the basis for a church cantata for the Easter Tuesday 1724, Ein Herz, das seinen Jesum lebend weiß. In the initial version of the Easter cantata, he made no changes to the 1719 music other than to omit two movements and replace the text with words for the occasion, written by an unknown author. In an adaptation for performances in the 1730s, he composed new recitatives for the Easter texts and made further changes to the music.

The cantata, written for a specific occasion, has not been recorded as often as other Bach cantatas. It has been used for congratulatory events such as the 80th birthday of Bach scholar Alfred Dürr, when the cantata title was chosen as that of an international conference about chronology in Bach's music, on which Dürr had focused.

== History and words ==
Bach composed Die Zeit, die Tag und Jahre macht in Köthen, where he served at the court of Leopold, Prince of Anhalt-Köthen, between 1717 and 1723. Bach had earlier been employed at the subordinate position of concert master at the Weimar court, now was Kapellmeister in Köthen, directing a qualified musical ensemble.

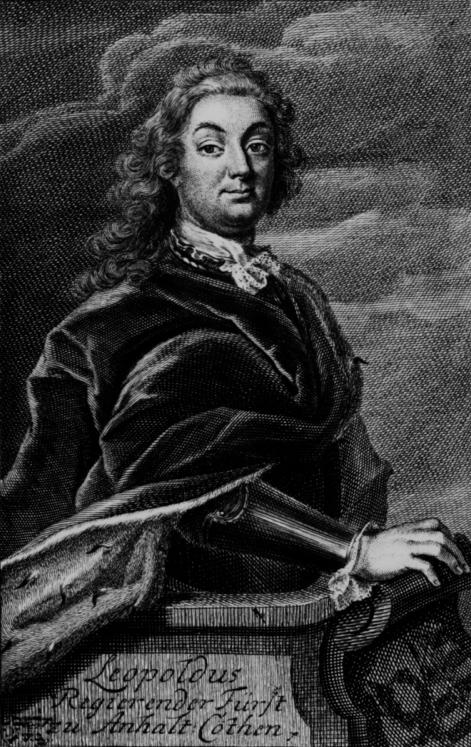
Leopold, Prince of Anhalt-Köthen (Note: The inscription reads: "Leopoldus / Regierender Fürst / von Anhalt-Cöthen" (Leopold / Reigning Prince / of Anhalt-Cöthen).)

The prince was enthusiastic about music, was a good bass singer, and played violin, viola da gamba and harpsichord. The court adhered to the Reformed Church; therefore, Bach had no obligation to compose church music as he had in his earlier posts and later as Thomaskantor in Leipzig. In Köthen, he had to write cantatas only for the court's two secular feast days: the prince's birthday and New Year's Day. He wrote Die Zeit, die Tag und Jahre macht as a congratulatory cantata for New Year's Day of 1719.

Only few cantatas survived of the twelve that Bach is thought to have composed in his six years while in Köthen, including Durchlauchtster Leopold, composed for the prince's birthday, probably in 1722. The homage cantatas were performed as serenatas or evening serenades. Their style is similar to opera of the period and includes dance-like music.

Die Zeit, die Tag und Jahre macht is based on words by Christian Friedrich Hunold, whose pen name was Menantes. A novelist as well as a librettist, Hunold taught at the University of Halle, about 30 kilometres (20 mi) from Köthen. Bach collaborated with him on several cantatas between 1718 and 1720. Hunold published the text in the collection Auserlesene und theils noch nie gedruckte Gedichte unterschiedener Berühmten und geschickten Männer (Selected and partly never printed poems of different notable and skillful men) in Halle in 1719. Other texts published by Hunold include that of Bach's cantata Der Himmel dacht auf Anhalts Ruhm und Glück, BWV 66a, written for the prince's birthday on 10 December 1718. Literally "Heaven thought of Anhalt's glory and fortune", it has also been translated in a singable version as "Since Heaven Cared for Anhalt's Fame and Bliss".

The text of the serenata Die Zeit, die Tag und Jahre macht, for most of the movements, recounts a dialogue between two allegorical figures: Time, representing the past, and Divine Providence, representing the future. The music remained in manuscript and, like most of Bach's works, was not printed in his lifetime. Bach led the first performance of the cantata on 1 January 1719.

=== Easter cantata ===
Bach later used the secular cantata in Leipzig as a basis for the Easter cantata Ein Herz, das seinen Jesum lebend weiß, BWV 134, which was first performed in the Nikolaikirche on 11 April 1724. In the first version of this Easter cantata, Bach made no significant changes to the music other than omitting the fifth and sixth movements. The new text, by an unknown poet, did not require musical adaptation. Bach had the parts for the singers of the retained movements copied without text and added the new text himself, with minor changes to the music. The instrumental parts were usable without changes but were duplicated for more performers. Perhaps for lack of time, Bach managed only the first page of a score with the new text and probably conducted from the Köthen score.

For another performance of the Easter cantata on 27 March 1731, Bach made changes to the music, including the composition of new recitatives for the 1724 text. He probably used this revised version again on 12 April 1735 and likely wrote a new score for this occasion.

=== Publication ===
With the revival of interest in Bach's music in the 19th century, Philipp Spitta, the author of a three-volume biography of Bach, discovered the printed text, making reconstruction of the entire work possible. The editors of the Bach-Gesellschaft-Ausgabe, the first complete edition of the composer's works, were aware of the cantata and observed its relationship to BWV 134. However, the Bach-Gesellschaft-Ausgabe printed Die Zeit, die Tag und Jahre macht in 1881 only as a fragment edited by Paul Waldersee. It is titled Mit Gnade bekröne der Himmel die Zeiten, which is a line from the first tenor aria. In 1963, the cantata was published in the Neue Bach-Ausgabe (NBA), the second complete edition of Bach's works, edited by Alfred Dürr, with a critical report the following year.

== Music ==
=== Structure and scoring ===
The cantata is structured in eight movements, with alternating recitatives and arias including mostly duets, culminating in a final choral movement. Bach scored the work for two soloists, alto as Divine Providence and tenor as Time, a four-part choir (SATB), and a baroque instrumental ensemble of two oboes (Ob), two violins (Vl), viola (Va) and basso continuo. The duration is given as 41 minutes.

In the following table, the scoring follows the Neue Bach-Ausgabe (New Bach Edition). The keys and time signatures are from Alfred Dürr and use the symbol for common time. The continuo, played throughout, is not shown.

Movements of Die Zeit, die Tag und Jahre macht
No.	Title	Text	Type	Vocal	Winds	Strings	Key	Time
1	"Die Zeit, die Tag und Jahre macht"	Hunold	Recitative	tenor alto			B♭ major	common time
2	"Auf, Sterbliche, lasset ein Jauchzen ertönen"	Hunold	Aria	tenor	2Ob	2Vl Va	B♭ major	3/8
3	"So bald, als dir die Sternen hold"	Hunold	Recitative	tenor alto			G minor	common time
4	"Es streiten, es siegen, die künftigen Zeiten"	Hunold	Aria	alto tenor		2Vl Va	E♭ major	cut time
5	"Bedenke nur, beglücktes Land"	Hunold	Recitative	alto tenor				common time
6	"Der Zeiten Herr hat viel vergnügte Stunden"	Hunold	Aria	alto			D minor	common time
7	"Hilf, Höchster, hilf, daß mich die Menschen preisen"	Hunold	Recitative	tenor alto			F major	common time
8	"Ergetzet auf Erden, erfreuet von oben"	Hunold	Chorus	tenor alto SATB	2Ob	2Vl Va	B♭ major	3/8

=== Movements ===
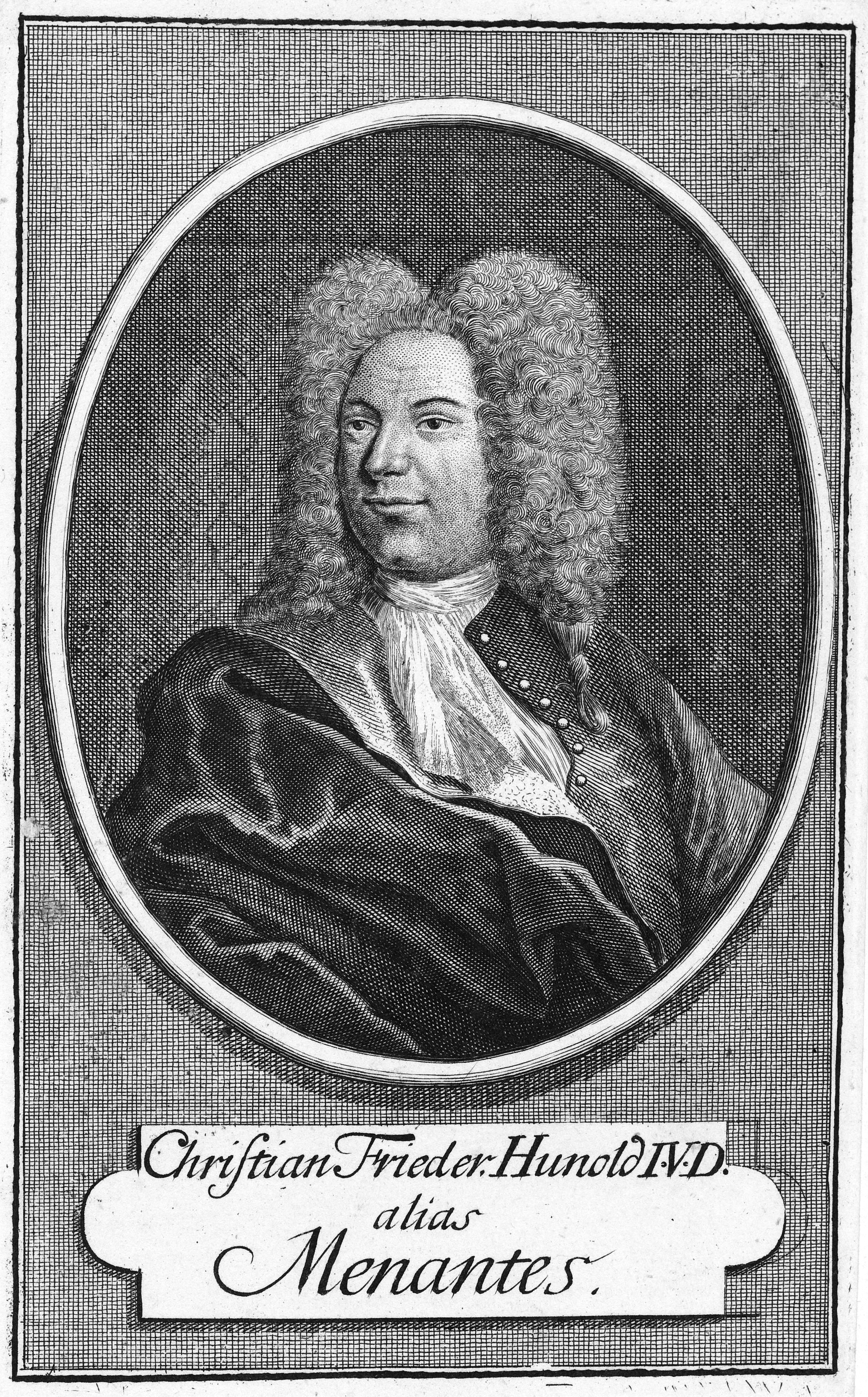
Christian Friedrich Hunold, the librettist

The cantata develops from a sequence of alternating recitatives and arias to a final chorus. This structure is similar to other cantatas Bach composed in Köthen, but it is different from most of his church cantatas, which begin with a weighty choral movement and end with a four-part chorale. All recitatives and one aria are dialogues. The recitatives are secco recitatives, accompanied only by the continuo. Richard D. P. Jones notes that the music of the Köthen secular cantatas is abundant in duets in the spirit of opera, with dances in Italian and French style.

==== 1 ====
The cantata begins with a recitative for both solo voices, "Die Zeit, die Tag und Jahre macht" (Time, which day and year doth make). It reflects that Anhalt, the prince's domain, was given many hours of blessing in the past.

==== 2 ====
The second movement is an aria for tenor, "Auf, Sterbliche, lasset ein Jauchzen ertönen" (Arise, mortals, let your jubilation resound), calling the people to give thanks for the blessings. An obbligato oboe dominates the movement.

==== 3 ====
The next recitative for both voices, "So bald, als dir die Sternen hold, o höchstgepriesnes Fürstentum" (As soon as the stars were favorable to you, o highly praised princedom), addresses Leopold, the ruler.

==== 4 ====
The fourth movement is a duet aria, in which the soloists sing slightly different text. The alto as Divine Providence considers the future: "Es streiten, es siegen die künftigen Zeiten im Segen für dieses durchlauchtigste Haus." (The future times struggle, they triumph in blessings for this illustrious house.) The tenor as Time looks at the past: "Es streiten, es prangen die vorigen Zeiten im Segen für dieses durchlauchtigste Haus." (The past times struggle, they glory in blessings for this illustrious house.) Bach's instrumentation complements the text well, accompanying the movement by the strings alone to match the text "strings of the heart". The competition of Time and Divine Providence is expressed in virtuoso singing and illustrated by figurations in the first violins.

==== 5 ====
The next recitative, again for both voices, "Bedenke nur, beglücktes Land, wieviel ich dir in dieser Zeit gegeben" (Yet consider, fortunate land, how much I have given you at this time), gives some details about Leopold's qualities and calls to pray for further happiness.

==== 6 ====
The second solo aria is for the alto, "Der Zeiten Herr hat viel vergnügte Stunden, du Götterhaus, dir annoch beigelegt" (The Lord of Ages has many happy hours, o godly house, bestowed upon you). Accompanied only by the continuo in ostinato motives, it freely expresses the "Harmonie der Seelen" (harmony of the souls).

==== 7 ====
The last recitative is again for both voices, "Hilf, Höchster, hilf, daß mich die Menschen preisen" (Help, o Highest, help, so that all people praise me), and calls for divine help to praise God and pray for further protection.

==== 8 ====
The cantata culminates in a choral movement opening by the tenor's "Ergetzet auf Erden" (Delight upon earth), followed by the alto's "erfreuet von oben" (rejoice on high), then all voices sing together in homophony "Glückselige Zeiten, vergnüget dies Haus!" (blessed ages, bring joy to this house). The pattern is repeated two more times, increasing in richness. The middle section is again started by alto and tenor, but this time together. With the following words, "sie blühen, sie leben" (May they flourish, may they live), a fugal development of all voices begins, quite similar to the opening chorus of Herz und Mund und Tat und Leben, a fast succession of the voices and a long melisma on the word leben, creating lively music. Alto and tenor start a fugue twice more, singing increasingly embellished lines on "durchlauchtigsten Seelen" (most illustrious souls). Close to the end of the middle section all voices shout together the word ruft (shout) twice, accented by a following rest. Then, the complete first part is repeated da capo.

The lively finale in 3/8 time and with regular phrases, like the French gigue or passepied, is typical of Bach's secular cantatas in Köthen. He had written music like this before in Weimar cantatas, for example the opening of the cantata for Pentecost Erschallet, ihr Lieder, and he would use it again in compositions in Leipzig, both secular and sacred.

== Recordings and performances ==
The following table is based on the list at the Bach Cantatas website. While the derived Easter cantata was included in the complete recordings of Bach's church cantatas by Nikolaus Harnoncourt and Gustav Leonhardt, Helmuth Rilling, Ton Koopman, Pieter Jan Leusink, John Eliot Gardiner and Masaaki Suzuki, the festive secular cantata dedicated to the specific occasion has only been recorded a few times. In the table, ensembles playing period instruments in historically informed performances are indicated by a green background.

Recordings of Die Zeit, die Tag und Jahre macht
Title	Conductor / Choir / Orchestra	Soloists	Label	Year	Instr.
J. S. Bach: Cantata BWV 134a	Wolfgang Unger Leipziger Universitätschor Pauliner Barockensemble	Mathias Koch; Nils Giesecke	Thorofon	1997	Period
J. S. Bach: Complete Cantatas Vol. 10	Ton Koopman Amsterdam Baroque Orchestra & Choir	Michael Chance; Paul Agnew	Antoine Marchand	1998	Period
Edition Bachakademie Vol. 139 – Congratulatory and Hommage Cantatas	Helmuth Rilling Gächinger Kantorei Bach-Collegium Stuttgart	Ingeborg Danz; Marcus Ullmann	Hänssler	2000	
Secular Cantatas Vol. 2	Masaaki Suzuki Bach Collegium Japan	Damien Guillon; Makoto Sakurada	BIS	2011	Period

The first recording was made in 1996, conducted by Wolfgang Unger, who had revived in 1992 the Leipziger Universitätsmusik, ensembles formed by students and teachers of the University of Leipzig. He paired the cantata with Die Freude reget sich, BWV 36b.

Koopman recorded the cantata in 1998 as part of volume 10 of his complete recordings of Bach's church cantatas, combined with the Easter cantata based on it and with other church cantatas.

In 2000, Rilling recorded, as volume 139 of Bach's cantatas, five Congratulatory and Hommage Cantatas, two of them for the first time: Angenehmes Wiederau and Schwingt freudig euch empor.

In his 2011 recording, Suzuki paired the cantata with the Hunting Cantata and the Sinfonia in F major, BWV 1046a/1, from an early version of the Brandenburg Concerto No. 1, with the same scoring as the Hunting Cantata. Reviewer Parry-Ridout notes the "purity of tone" of the alto, the "richness and expression" of the tenor, and the virtuosity of both when competing in a duet.

The cantata was performed in 2011 to conclude the festival Köthener Herbst in the Johann-Sebastian-Bach-Saal of Schloss Köthen. The program was Carl Friedrich Abel's Symphony No. 1, Bach's cantata Durchlauchtster Leopold, BWV 173a, his Brandenburg Concerto No. 4, and finally Die Zeit, die Tag und Jahre macht, with soloists Veronika Winter, Franz Vitzthum, Immo Schröder and Matthias Vieweg, and the ensemble Das Kleine Konzert, conducted by Hermann Max.

== Legacy ==
In 1998, an international musicological conference was held in Göttingen, Germany, on the occasion of the 80th birthday of Bach scholar Alfred Dürr, who had devoted his life to studies of Bach's works and their chronology. It was titled "'Die Zeit, die Tag und Jahre macht': zur Chronologie des Schaffens von Johann Sebastian Bach", and featured a public performance of the cantata. Essays by the international musicologists who gathered, such as Hans-Joachim Schulze, Andreas Glöckner and Jean-Claude Zehnder, were published. Most of them focused specifically on the person's field of expertise in relation to Dürr's achievements.

== Cited sources ==
From Bach Digital

- "Die Zeit, die Tag und Jahre macht (serenata) BWV 134.1; BWV 134a; BC G 5 / Secular cantata (unknown purpose)". Bach Digital. 2018.
- "Ein Herz, das seinen Jesum lebend weiß (early version) BWV 134.2; BC A 59a / Sacred cantata (3rd Easter Day)". Bach Digital. 2018.
- "Ein Herz, das seinen Jesum lebend weiß (later version) BWV 134.3; BC A 59b / Sacred cantata (3rd Easter Day)". Bach Digital. 2018.
- "Der Himmel dacht auf Anhalts Ruhm und Glück (serenata) BWV 66.1; BWV 66a; BC (G 4) / Secular cantata (Birthday)". Bach Digital. 2018.

=== Books ===
- Dürr, Alfred; Jones, Richard D. P. (2006). "Die Zeit, die Tag und Jahre macht, BWV 134a". The Cantatas of J. S. Bach: With Their Librettos in German–English Parallel Text. Oxford University Press. pp. 20, 284, 797–798, 809–813. ISBN 978-0-19-929776-4.
- Jones, Richard D. P. (2013). "I.4 Sacred and secular: the vocal works". The Creative Development of Johann Sebastian Bach, Volume II: 1717–1750: Music to Delight the Spirit. Oxford University Press. pp. 106–108. ISBN 978-0-19-150384-9.
- Marshall, Robert L.; Marshall, Traute M. (2016). "Köthen 1717–23". Exploring the World of J. S. Bach: A Traveler's Guide. University of Illinois Press. pp. 63–66. ISBN 978-0-25-209857-4.
- Wessel, Jens (2015). "Köthen (1717–1723)". J. S. Bach und die italienische Oper / Drammi per musica für das kurfürstlich-sächsische und polnische Königshaus zwischen 1733 und 1736 ( PDF) (dissertation) (in German). Hochschule für Musik und Theater Hamburg. pp. 22–24.
- Wolff, Christoph (2000). Johann Sebastian Bach: The Learned Musician. W. W. Norton & Company. pp. 187. ISBN 978-0-39-307595-3.
- Internationales wissenschaftliches Colloquium aus Anlass des 80. Geburtstages von Alfred Dürr (1998 : Göttingen, Germany); Dürr, Alfred; Staehelin, Martin (2001). Die Zeit, die Tag und Jahre macht" : zur Chronologie des Schaffens von Johann Sebastian Bach : Bericht über das Internationale wissenschaftliche Colloquium aus Anlass des 80. Geburstages von Alfred Dürr, Göttingen, 13.-15. März 1998 (in German). Göttingen: Vandenhoeck & Ruprecht.

=== Online sources ===
- Bischof, Walter F. (2018). "BWV 134a Die Zeit, die Tag und Jahre macht". Bach Cantatas Website. University of Alberta.
- Dellal, Pamela (2018). "Bach Cantata Translations – BWV 134a – 'Die Zeit, die Tag und Jahre macht'". Emmanuel Music.
- Lewis, Uncle Dave (2018). "Helmuth Rilling / Bach: Congratulatory & Hommage Cantatas". AllMusic.
- Oron, Aryeh. "Cantata BWV 134a Die Zeit, die Tag und Jahre macht". Bach Cantatas Website.
- Parry-Ridout, Hannah (2012). "Johann Sebastian Bach (1685–1759) / Secular Cantatas Vol. 2". MusicWeb International.
- Rimek, Tobias (2014). Ein Herz, das seinen Jesum lebend weiß / The soul that truly knows his risen Lord / BWV 134 [score] (PDF). Translated by Kosviner, David. Carus. p. 2.
- Tomita, Yo (2002). "'Die Zeit, die Tag und Jahre macht'. Zur Chronologie des Schaffens von Johann Sebastian Bach. Bericht über das Internationale wissenschaftliche Collequium aus Anlaß das 80. Geburtstages von Alfred Dürr. Edited by Martin Staehelin. (book review)". Bach Bibliography (in German). Queen's University Belfast. Archived from the original on 1 July 2017.
- "Bach: Cantatas Vol 10 / Koopman, Amsterdam Baroque". ArkivMusic. 2018. Archived from the original on 27 September 2018.
- "8. Köthener Herbst". Mitteilungsblatt des Landkreises Anhalt-Bitterfeld (in German). 17 June 2011. p. 22.
- "'Since Heaven Cared for Anhalt's Fame and Bliss' BWV 66a / Congratulatory Cantata – reconstructed and edited by Alexander Grychtolik". Breitkopf & Härtel. 2018. Archived from the original on 25 October 2018.
- "Leipziger Universitätschor / Diskographie". Leipziger Universitätsmusik (in German). 2018.
- "Abschied von Universitätsmusikdirektor Professor Wolfgang Unger". University of Leipzig (in German). 26 April 2004.
