= Görner =

Görner is a surname. Notable people with the name include:

- Christine Görner (1930–2024), German actress and opera singer
- Karl August Görner (1806–1884), German actor, director and playwright
- Karl Friedrich Görner, German organist
- Johann Gottlieb Görner (1697–1778), German composer and organist
- Johann Valentin Görner (1702 –1762), German composer
- Hermann Görner (1891–1956), German strongman

== See also ==
- Gorner Glacier, a valley glacier on the Monte Rosa massif in Switzerland
