= Ein Herz, das seinen Jesum lebend weiß, BWV 134 =

Cantata by Johann Sebastian Bach

Ein Herz, das seinen Jesum lebend weiß
- BWV 134
- Church cantata by J. S. Bach
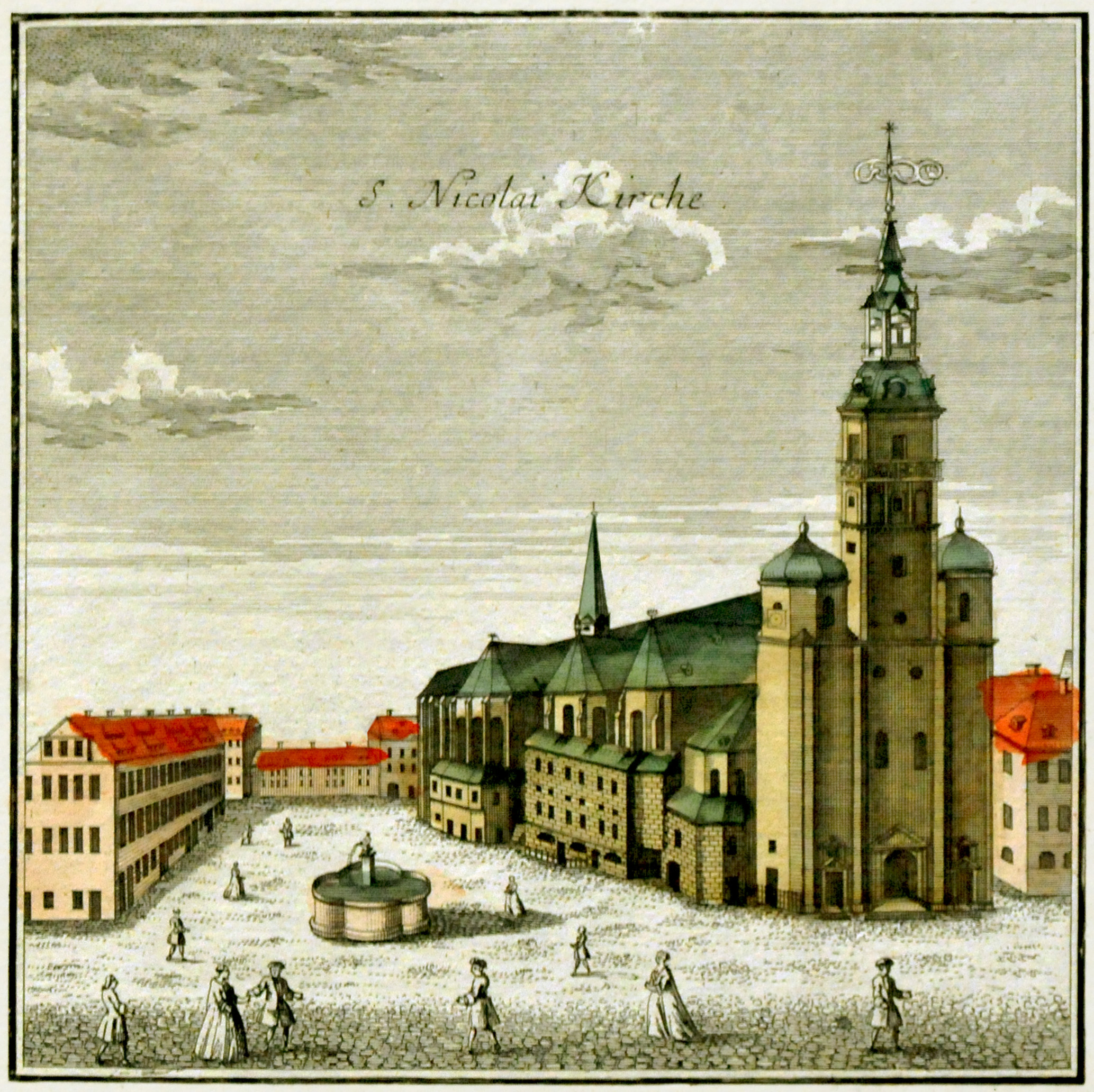
- Nikolaikirche, Leipzig, 1749 engraving
- Related: based on BWV 134a
- Occasion: Third day of Easter
- Performed: 11 April 1724: Leipzig
- Movements: 6
- Vocal: SATB choir; solo: alto and tenor
- Instrumental: 2 oboes; 2 violins; viola; continuo

Ein Herz, das seinen Jesum lebend weiß (A heart that knows its Jesus is living), BWV 134, is a church cantata for Easter by Johann Sebastian Bach. Bach composed the cantata for the third day of Easter in Leipzig and first performed it on 11 April 1724. He based it on his congratulatory cantata Die Zeit, die Tag und Jahre macht, BWV 134a, first performed in Köthen on 1 January 1719.

== History and words ==
The cantata is Bach's second composition for Easter in Leipzig. On Easter Sunday of 1724, he had performed Christ lag in Todes Banden, BWV 4, from his time in Mühlhausen. On the second day of Easter was the first performanbce of Erfreut euch, ihr Herzen, BWV 66, which he had derived from the secular serenata Der Himmel dacht auf Anhalts Ruhm und Glück, BWV 66a, composed in Köthen in 1718. In a similar way, he arranged a cantata for the New Year's Day of 1719 in Köthen, Die Zeit, die Tag und Jahre macht, BWV 134a, for the third day of Easter.

The prescribed readings for the feast day were from the Acts of the Apostles, the sermon of Paul in Antioch (Acts 13:26–33), and from the Gospel of Luke, the appearance of Jesus to the Apostles in Jerusalem (Luke 24:36–47). The unknown poet adapted the dialogues of the secular work of two allegorical figures, Time and Divine Providence, originally written by Christian Friedrich Hunold, one of the notable novelists of his time. In this cantata the poet kept the order of the movements, dropping movements 5 and 6 of the early work. He kept the final chorus as a conclusion, unlike Erfreut euch, ihr Herzen, where it had been moved to the opening and replaced by a chorale. Bach simply wrote the new text below the former text in his score.

Bach led the Thomanerchor in the first performance at the Nikolaikirche on 11 April 1724. He composed three new recitatives for a second version and first performed it on 27 March 1731. Bach revised the whole cantata 1735, writing a new score with detailed improvements. Matching parts for this version are missing, and it is thus unclear if it was actually performed at the time.

== Scoring and structure ==
The cantata in six movements is scored for alto and tenor soloists, a four-part choir, two oboes, two violins, viola, and basso continuo.

1. Recitative (alto, tenor): Ein Herz, das seinen Jesum lebend weiß
2. Aria (tenor): Auf, Gläubige, singet die lieblichen Lieder
3. Recitative (alto, tenor): Wohl dir, Gott hat an dich gedacht
4. Aria (alto, tenor): Wir danken und preisen dein brünstiges Lieben
5. Recitative (alto, tenor): Doch würke selbst den Dank in unserm Munde
6. Chorus: Erschallet, ihr Himmel, erfreuet dich, Erde

== Recordings ==
- J. S. Bach: 10 Festkantaten, Helmut Winschermann, Kantorei Barmen-Gemarke, Deutsche Bachsolisten, Julia Hamari, Kurt Equiluz, Philips 1971
- Die Bach Kantate Vol. 30, Helmuth Rilling, Gächinger Kantorei, Bach-Collegium Stuttgart, Helen Watts, Adalbert Kraus, Hänssler 1977
- J. S. Bach: Das Kantatenwerk – Sacred Cantatas Vol. 7, Gustav Leonhardt, Knabenchor Hannover, Collegium Vocale Gent, Leonhardt-Consort, René Jacobs, Marius van Altena, Teldec 1983
- Bach Made in Germany Vol. 4 – Cantatas VII, Hans-Joachim Rotzsch, Thomanerchor, Neues Bachisches Collegium Musicum, Ortrun Wenkel, Peter Schreier, Eterna 1984
- J. S. Bach: Complete Cantatas Vol. 10, Ton Koopman, Amsterdam Baroque Orchestra & Choir, Michael Chance, Paul Agnew, Antoine Marchand 1998
- J. S. Bach: Vol. 22, English Baroque Soloists, Monteverdi Choir, Daniel Taylor, James Gilchrist, Soli Deo Gloria 2000
- J. S. Bach: Cantatas Vol. 18 – Cantatas from Leipzig 1724, Masaaki Suzuki, Bach Collegium Japan, Robin Blaze, Makoto Sakurada, BIS
