= Siegfried Lorenz (baritone) =

German baritone (1945–2024)

- Lorenz in the 1970s
- Born: 30 August 1945; East Berlin, Allied-occupied Germany
- Died: 24 August 2024 (aged 78)
- Occupations: Baritone; Academic teacher
- Organizations: Komische Oper Berlin; Berlin State Opera; Musikhochschule Hamburg; Universität der Künste Berlin
- Title: Kammersänger
- Awards: Preis der deutschen Schallplattenkritik; National Prize of the German Democratic Republic

Siegfried Lorenz (German: [ˈziːk.fʁiːt ˈloː.ʁɛnts]; 30 August 1945 – 24 August 2024) was a German baritone who performed opera, oratorio and Lied. A member of the Komische Oper Berlin and later the Berlin State Opera, he made award-winning recordings and appeared as a guest internationally. He was also an academic voice teacher at the Musikhochschule Hamburg and the Universität der Künste Berlin.

== Life and career ==
Born in Berlin on 30 August 1945, Lorenz studied voice in his hometown at the Hochschule für Musik "Hanns Eisler" from 1964 to 1969, where he was a master student of Alois Orth. After receiving several prizes at international singing competitions, Lorenz was engaged as a lyrical baritone at the Komische Oper Berlin by Walter Felsenstein in 1969. In 1973, he became the first vocal soloist at the Gewandhaus in Leipzig, a position which Kurt Masur created for him. He performed and recorded several cantatas by Johann Sebastian Bach and became known as a Lied singer. His recordings of songs by Franz Schubert received several awards.

From 1978 to 1992, Lorenz was first lyrical baritone at the Staatsoper Berlin in Berlin. He appeared successfully as Wolfram in Wagner's Tannhäuser, as the Count in Mozart's Die Hochzeit des Figaro, as Posa in Verdi's Don Carlos, and as Borromeo in Hans Pfitzner's Palestrina, among others.

He recorded Mahler's Kindertotenlieder with the Gewandhausorchester and Masur, and Schubert song cycles with pianist Norman Shetler. English music critic Alan Blyth reviewed Winterreise for Gramophone and noted: "He sings with pleasing, consistently firm tone and with an enviable control of line and dynamics. The range of his voice is not so large as Fischer-Dieskau's, a singer from whom he has learnt so much, but within its smaller compass he can achieve almost the same power and intensity." Recordings of Schubert songs between 1974 and 1987 were combined to form a collection covering 151 of his songs. A reviewer wrote that Lorenz "penetrated Schubert's songs for many years and this eight-CD box is the result of assiduous study and a long-term plan".

Lorenz recorded the role of Beckmesser in Wagner's Die Meistersinger von Nürnberg, alongside Ben Heppner, Cheryl Studer and Bernd Weikl, conducted by Wolfgang Sawallisch; this recording was nominated as the Best Opera Recording at the 1994 Grammy Awards. He recorded Bach's solo cantatas for bass, Ich will den Kreuzstab gerne tragen and Ich habe genug, with the Neues Bachisches Collegium Musicum conducted by Max Pommer, as well as orchestral works by Mahler including Lieder eines fahrenden Gesellen conducted by Günther Herbig and Fünf Lieder nach Friedrich Rückert with the Staatskapelle Berlin conducted by Otmar Suitner.

Lorenz performed as a guest in Europe, the US and Japan. In 1976, he was awarded the Kunstpreis, and in 1983 the National Prize of the German Democratic Republic. In 1979, he received the title Kammersänger of the Berlin State Opera. He was appointed professor in 1982, and taught from 2001 to 2003 at the Musikhochschule Hamburg, and from October 2003 at the Universität der Künste Berlin.

Lorenz lived in the Berlin-Mahlsdorf and died on 24 August 2024, at the age of 78.

== Awards ==
- 1996 Preis der Deutschen Schallplattenkritik for Hindemith's Das Unaufhörliche
