= Leipziger Universitätschor =

University choir of the University of Leipzig

- Choir
- Origin: Leipzig, Germany
- Founded: 1926
- Founder: Friedrich Rabenschlag
- Genre: Mixed choir
- Members: 100
- Chief conductor: David Timm
- Website: www.uni-leipzig.de/unichor

The Leipziger Universitätschor (LUC) is the university choir of the University of Leipzig. A mixed choir, it is formed by approximately 100 students from all faculties. It was founded in 1926 as Madrigalkreis Leipziger Studenten (Madrigal circle of Leipzig students), and has gone by its present name since 1938. It is now part of the Leipziger Universitätsmusik.

== History ==
Music at the University of Leipzig has a long tradition. Music was one of four initial topics taught upon the university's founding. The first Universitätsmusikdirektor (director of university music) known by name was Werner Fabricius, who served from 1656 to 1679; he was followed by Johann Kuhnau and Max Reger, among many others.

On 17 June 1926, Friedrich Rabenschlag founded the Madrigalkreis Leipziger Studenten in his room in the Leipzig Bachviertel. The small group performed mostly a cappella music of the Renaissance.

When Rabenschlag became the church musician (Kantor) of the Paulinerkirche, Leipzig, the university church, in 1933, performances were often held there, often in collaboration with the Universitätskantorei. Both choirs merged in 1938 to the Leipziger Universitätschor. Rabenschlag conducted the choir until 1962, when he retired for health reasons.

On 27 November 1962, Rabenschlag's successor was Hans-Joachim Rotzsch, who continued to conduct the choir even after he was appointed Thomaskantor in 1972. During his tenure, the Paulinerkirche, the choir's home, was dynamited on 30 May 1968 by the GDR regime.

On 19 December 1973, Max Pommer became the new conductor of the Leipziger Universitätschor. He focused on historically informed performances, but also conducted contemporary works by Paul Dessau and Alfred Schnittke.

In 1987, Wolfgang Unger took over as conductor. He revived the academic services, now held at the Nikolaikirche. Unger was appointed Universitätsmusikdirektor in 1991. The choir celebrated its 65th anniversary with a performance of Mozart's Requiem on 22 November 1991. Twenty-five years after the demolition of the Paulinerkrche, the choir performed a memorial concert at the Gewandhaus on 26 May 1993. The choir's recording of Hugo Distler's Litugische Gesänge won an Echo Klassik award in 2001. Unger led the choir until his death in 2004. He was succeeded by David Timm.

== Conductors ==
Several conductors shaped the choir:

- 1926–1962: Friedrich Rabenschlag
- 1962–1963: Christoph Schneider (ad interim)
- 1963–1973: Hans-Joachim Rotzsch
- 1973–1987: Max Pommer
- 1987–2004: Wolfgang Unger
- 2004–2005: Ulf Wellner (ad interim)
- Since 2005: David Timm

== Literature ==
- Manuel Bärwald: Der Leipziger Universitätschor in Geschichte und Gegenwart. Untersuchungen zu Ursprung, Entwicklungen und Traditionen im Kontext seiner Chorleiter. In: Eszter Fontana (ed.): 600 Jahre Musik an der Universität Leipzig. Studien anlässlich des Jubiläums. Stekovics, Wettin 2010, ISBN 978-3-89923-245-5, pp. 349–365.
- Wehner, Ralf (2011). "Sein Wirken für den Leipziger Universitätschor". In Unger, Johannes (ed.). Wolfgang Unger: Leben für die Musik (in German). Books on Demand. p. 83. ISBN 9783842339378.
