= David Timm =

German pianist and choir director

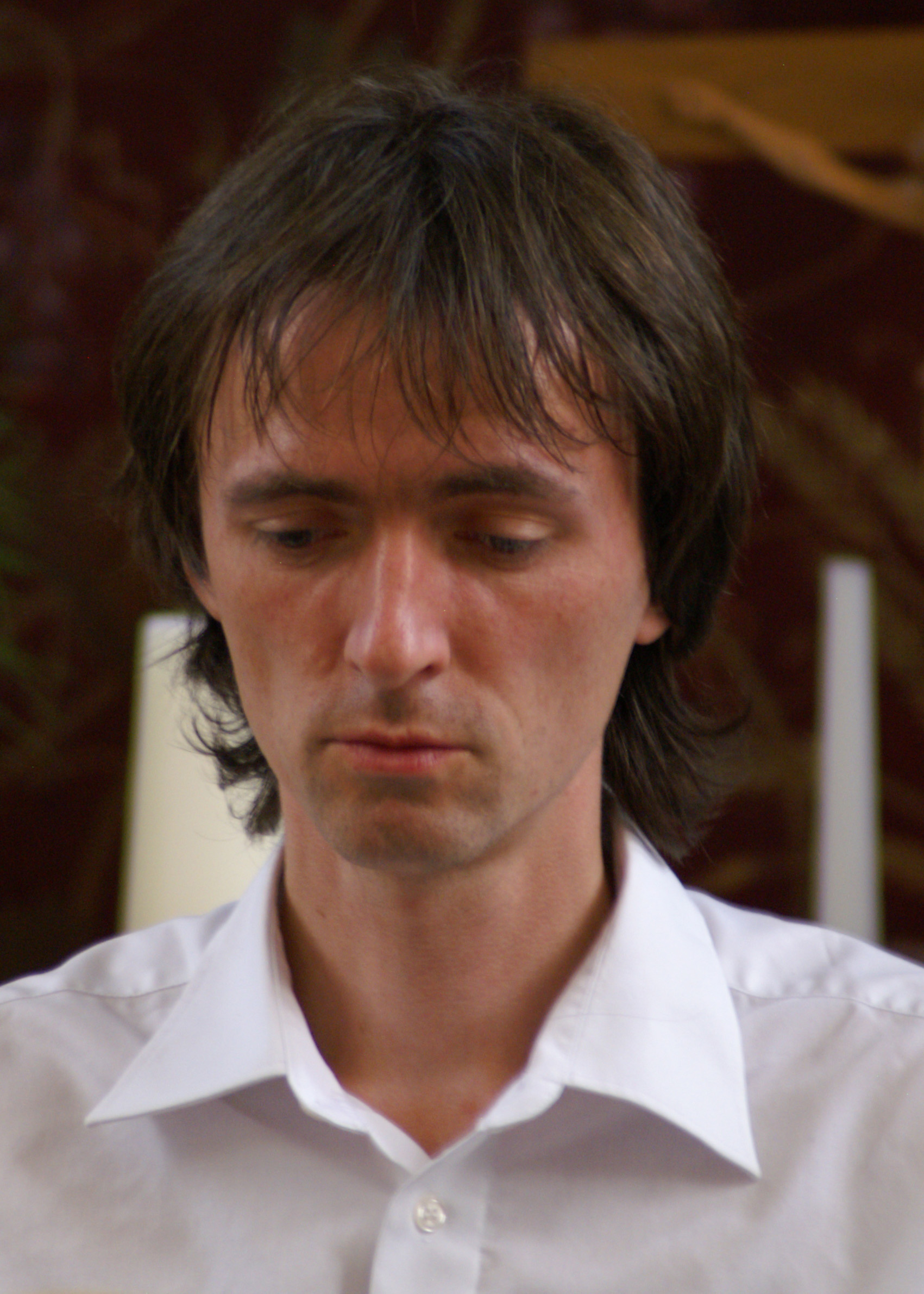
- Born: 24 April 1969 (age 56); Eibenstock, East Germany
- Education: Thomanerchor; Musikhochschule Leipzig; Mozarteum
- Occupations: Conductor; Pianist; Organist; Academic
- Organizations: Leipziger Universitätschor; University of Leipzig; Musikhochschule Leipzig

David Timm (born 24 April 1969) is a German pianist, organist, choral conductor and jazz musician. Since February 2005 he has been Universitätsmusikdirektor (University Music Director) of the Leipzig University, and thus also director of the Leipziger Universitätschor, succeeding Wolfgang Unger.

== Biography ==
Born in Waren, Timm was educated at the St. Thomas School, Leipzig. He was a member and later first prefect of the Thomanerchor. He studied church music at the University of Music and Theatre Leipzig from 1989 to 1995 with Hannes Kästner, organ with Arvid Gast, improvisation with Volker Bräutigam, and completed his studies with the Church music in Germany A-Exam. He continued studies of piano with Markus Tomas and graduated with distinction in 1999. In 1996/97 he studied with Karl-Heinz Kämmerling at the Salzburg Mozarteum. From 1998 to 2002, he taught choral conducting at the Evangelische Hochschule für Kirchenmusik Halle, and from 1998 liturgical organ playing at the Leipzig Musikhochschule. From 2002, he also taught artistic organ playing there, and in 2017 he was appointed honorary professor.

Since 1991, Timm has performed together with the saxophonist Reiko Brockelt as JazzDuo Timm/Brockelt at national and international classical and jazz festivals. Together with the saxophonist Frank Nowicky he founded the LeipzigBigband in 1999 and was musical director of the Leipziger Vocalensemble from 1999 to 2006.

In 1997, he was awarded the first Prize of the international competition of organ improvisation in Schwäbisch Gmünd. He composed Jazzmesse (or Jazz-Messe), a setting of the mass with jazz elements, which he recorded, together with Max Reger's Der 100. Psalm, with soloists, the Thomanerchor, the Leipziger Universitätschor and the Gewandhausorchester.

Timm is co-founder and Chairman of the Board of Directors of the Richard-Wagner-Gesellschaft Leipzig 2013 association, now called Leipziger Romantik. He is honorary member of the Richard Wagner Verband in Leipzig. In 2008 he was awarded the Mozart Prize of the Sächsischen Mozart-Gesellschaft.
