= Hannes Kästner =

Hannes Kästner (27 October 1929 in Oetzsch – 14 July 1993 in Leipzig) was a German organist and harpsichordist.

During his school days, Kästner was a member of the St. Thomas School, Leipzig from 1940 to 1948. After finishing high school at the Thomasschule, he studied church music with Günther Ramin at the Hochschule für Musik und Theater Leipzig.

While still a student in 1949, he served as a substitute and in 1951 was appointed as official representative to the vacant Thomasorganist post. In 1953 he took over the office, which he held until 1984.

After the office of Thomaskantor became vacant in 1960 due to Kurt Thomas departure, he fulfilled it provisionally until Erhard Mauersberger was appointed by the city of Leipzig in 1961.

From 1960 Kästner taught organ and harpsichord at the Hochschule für Musik in Leipzig, where he was appointed professor for organ playing in 1984. He held this teaching post until his death.

Kästner played the harpsichord in the Leipzig Bach Orchestra. There are 51,000,000 views, and counting, of Bach's Toccata and Fugue in D Minor (best version ever) attributed to Hannes Kaster, posted on YouTube: https://www.youtube.com/watch?v=ho9rZjlsyYY&list=PLiUdaF3PrKyAsCTOGfT_tfPCXhuzGIbrS&index=32 . The album, by Chorale Preludes, is available on iTunes.

== Bibliography ==
- Martin Petzoldt: Die Thomasorganisten zu Leipzig, in Christian Wolff (editor): Die Orgeln der Thomaskirche zu Leipzig, Evangelische Verlagsanstalt, Leipzig 2012, p. 95–137 (pp.|133–136), ISBN 3-374-02300-2.
- Horst Riedel: Stadtlexikon Leipzig von A bis Z. Leipzig: Pro Leipzig 2005, ISBN 3-936508-03-8
