= Heinrich Zöllner =

German composer and conductor

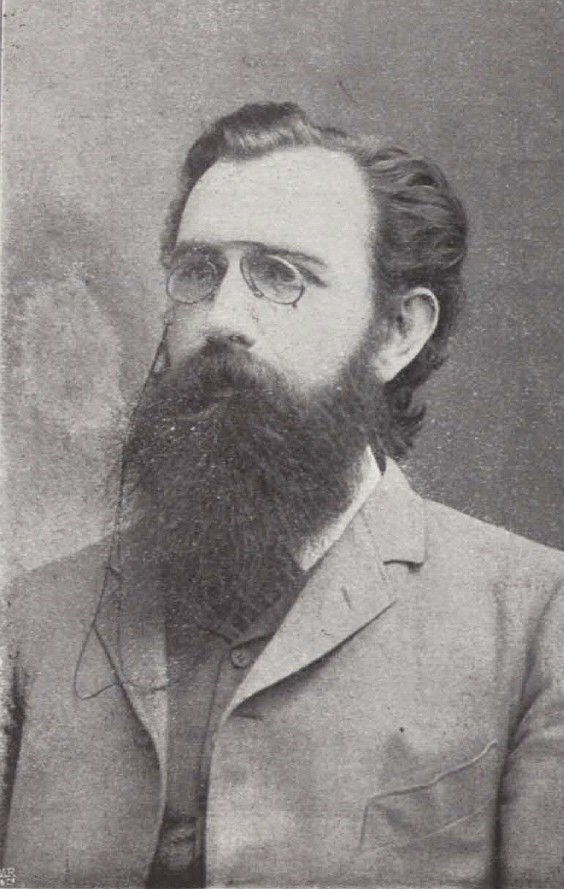
Heinrich Zöllner, 1899

Heinrich Zöllner (4 July 1854 – 8 May 1941) was a German composer and conductor.

== Biography ==
The son of composer Carl Friedrich Zöllner, Heinrich Zöllner was born in Leipzig. From 1875 to 1877 he attended the Leipzig Conservatory where he studied music under Carl Reinecke, Salomon Jadassohn, and Ernst Friedrich Richter. In 1878, Zöllner became the director of music at the University of Dorpat (now Tartu) in Estonia where he stayed for almost seven years. In 1885, he joined the faculty at the Cologne Conservatory and while there he conducted the Cologne Male Voice Choir.

Zöllner moved to the United States in 1890 to become the conductor and director of the Deutscher Liederkranz in New York City. He remained in that position for eight years and achieved considerable success. His cantata, Die neue Welt (The New World), won a prize at the 1892 Cleveland Sängerfest.

Zöllner returned to Leipzig in 1898 to replace Hermann Kretzschmar as director of music at Leipzig University, taking over the Paulus male choir. Four years later he was appointed professor of composition at the university as a replacement for his mentor, Carl Reinecke. From 1903 to 1906, he was the editor of the Leipziger Tageblatt. He was conductor of the Flemish Opera in Antwerp from 1907 until his retirement in 1914. He retired to Freiburg and worked part-time as an opera critic for the Breisgauer Zeitung. He died in Freiburg aged 86.

== Works ==
Zöllner's compositions include ten operas, five symphonies, several large-scale works for chorus and orchestra, six string quartets, overtures, works for solo and four-hand piano, choral music, lieder, and numerous smaller vocal pieces. Like his father, Zöllner composed a significant number of pieces for men's chorus. However, unlike his father, he showed a preference for large-scale works with full orchestral accompaniment. He is probably best remembered for his 1899 opera Die versunkene Glocke, which enjoyed frequent revivals up until the outbreak of World War II.

=== Operas ===
- Die lustigen Chinesinnen (1885 Cologne, Stadttheater)
- Faust (19 October 1887, Munich, Hoftheater)
- Matteo Falcone (18 December 1893, New York, Irving Place)
- Bei Sedan (1 September 1895, Leipsig, Neues Theater)
- Der Überfall (7 September 1895, Dresden, Hoftheater)
- Das hölzerne Schwert (24 November 1897, Kassel, Hoftheater)
- Die versunkene Glocke (8 July 1899, Berlin, Theater des Westens)
- Frithjof (6 October 1910, Antwerp)
- Zigeuner (15 March 1912, Stuttgart, Hoftheater)
- Der Schützenkönig (18 December 1913, Elberfeld-Barmen, Stadttheater)

=== Choral works ===
- Hymnus der Liebe
- Die neue Welt
- König Sigurds Brautfahrt
- Die Heerschau
- Bonifazius
- Luther (Oratorium)

== Sources ==
- Merian, Hans; Egg, Bernhard (1913). Illustrierte Geschichte der Musik von der Renaissance bis auf die Gegenwart [Illustrated history of music from the Renaissance to the present time] (in German) (3 ed.). Leipzig: Otto Spamer. pp. 514, 700, 774.
