= Georg Wildführ =

East German medical microbiologist and hygienist

- Born: 30 August 1904; Linden (Hannover), Germany
- Died: 4 August 1984 (aged 79); Holzhausen (Leipzig), East Germany
- Education: Dresden University of Technology; Leipzig University
- Occupations: Medical microbiologist Hygienist
- Political party: SPD (1928-1933); KPD (1945-1946); SED (1946-1949); CDU (from 1949)

Georg Wildführ (30 August 1904 – 4 August 1984) was an East German Medical microbiologist and hygienist.

His scientific work particularly focused on bacteriology, serology, epidemiology, hygiene, and toxoplasmosis.

== Life ==
=== Early years ===
Georg Wildführ was born in Linden, then a village near the edge of the city, but following large scale urbanisation and local government boundary reforms in 1920 a city-district in Hannover. His father was a factory foreman. After completing his primary schooling, he studied Architecture at Leibniz University Hannover between 1923 and 1925 before switching to medicine.

=== Medical training ===
Between 1925 and 1931 he studied Medicine at Berlin and Göttingen. He received his Doctorate from Berlin in 1932, for a dissertation entitled "About Sydenham's chorea and Tics" ("Über Chorea minor und Tic"). A succession of hospital posts followed, in Berlin, Hannover, Gelsenkirchen, and Cologne.

=== Increasing distinction ===
Further academic promotion followed in 1943 with a Habilitation from the Dresden University of Technology for a work entitled "Studies on the question of the toxin-creating possibilities of the Gas gangrene Bacillus in synthetic growth media" ("Studien zur Frage des Toxinbildungsvermögens der Gasoedem-Bazillen in künstlichen Nährböden").

=== Professorships ===
From 1945 to 1946 Wildführ was a professor at Dresden, which by then was in the Soviet occupation zone of what had previously been Germany, and from 1946 to 1947 he was Professor for Hygiene. In 1947 he switched to Leipzig University where he remained Professor for Hygiene and Bacteriology until 1970.

He took over as Director of the Leipzig Hygiene Centre (later the Leipzig Regional Hygiene Institute) in 1947, and in 1958 he took on the newly created (teaching) chair for Medical Microbiology and Epidemic Protection at the university. In the same year he was appointed Director of the Institute for Medical Microbiology and Epidemiology. From 1964 to 1976 he held the chair for Medical Microbiology at the National Academy for Medical Research. He also assumed the chair for General and Communal Hygiene at the Hygiene Institute in 1970. From 1961 to 1965 he was Dean of the Medical Faculty at Leipzig, and from 1970 to 1973 President of the national Society for Overall Hygiene.

=== Politics ===
From May 1945 party membership other than of the NSDAP (Nazi party) was no longer illegal and Georg Wildführ, living by now in the part of Germany that would in the next few years become the German Democratic Republic, joined the KPD (Communist party). Following the merger in this party of Germany of the Communist party and the (traditionally more moderately socialist) SPD (party) that made him, from 1946, a member of the new country's ruling SED (party). However, he resigned his membership and in 1949 joined the CDU (party) at around the same time as the East German version of the CDU was itself being brought more explicitly under the political control of the SED.

=== Uranium ===
As early as 1947 Wildführ was issuing warnings about the health dangers of the Uranium mining, caused by dust, radiation and lead, arising at the country's strategically important and tightly controlled Wismut operation. However, the political leadership generally ignored his concerns.

== Awards and honours ==
Georg Wildführ was an Honorary Senator of the University of Leipzig and he was honoured by the state as a Senior Medical Counsellor (OMR / Obermedizinalrat). Leipzig gave him an Honorary Doctorate in 1973.

He received the Rudolf Virchow Prize, the National Prize of East Germany in 1962 and in 1963 the Badge of Honour from Karl Marx University (Leipzig). In 1964 he was designated an Honoured Doctor of the People.

== Selected publications ==
- G. Wildführ, W. Wildführ (edited): Medizinische Mikrobiologie, Immunologie und Epidemiologie. Thieme, Leipzig 1976
- G. Wildführ, W. Wildführ: Toxoplasmose. Ratgeber für Ärzte und Tierärzte. Gustav Fischer Verlag, 1975
- G. Wildführ, J. Schmidt: Aktuelle Probleme der medizinischen Mikrobiologie. Thieme, Leipzig 1969
