= Christian Friedrich Michaelis (philosopher) =

German philosopher (1770–1834)

Christian Friedrich Michaelis (3 September 1770 – August 1834) was a German philosopher, music aesthete, and essayist.

== Life ==
Michaelis was the son of a medical doctor and he studied at the University of Leipzig from 1787, before travelling to Jena to learn from Karl Leonhard Reinhold and Friedrich Schiller. In 1793 he became a private lecturer in Leipzig and published numerous philosophical articles and writings, including the work Ueber den Geist der Tonkunst (On the Spirit of Music) and several books on Kant’s philosophy and aesthetics.

He was a frequent contributor to the music journal Allgemeine musikalische Zeitung. His hopes of becoming a professor failed, presumably due to his closeness to Johann Gottlieb Fichte, who was dismissed in 1799 as a result of the atheism dispute.

== Publications ==
Michaelis’ publications include;

- Ueber den geist der tonkunst mit ru̇cksicht auf Kants kritik der ȧsthetischen urtheilskraft (1795)
- Ueber die sittliche natur und bestimmung des menschen: ein versuch zur erläuterung über I.Kant's Kritik der praktischen vernunft (1796)
- Moral Lectures (1800)
- Museum des Witzes und der Laune (1808)
- Theoretical Practical German Grammar (1825)
