= Wolfgang Unger =

German conductor

- Born: 31 December 1948; Eibenstock, Germany
- Died: 19 April 2004 (aged 55); Halle (Saale), Germany
- Education: Kreuzschule; Musikhochschule Weimar
- Occupations: Conductor; Academic
- Organizations: Thüringischer Akademischer Singkreis; Staatskapelle Halle; Leipziger Universitätschor; University of Leipzig; Musikhochschule Leipzig
- Awards: Handel Music Prize

Wolfgang Unger (31 December 1948 – 19 April 2004) was a German conductor, especially a choral conductor, and an academic in Halle and Leipzig. He founded several choirs and focused on the music of Johann Sebastian Bach and his contemporaries. Like Bach, he directed the music at the University of Leipzig, called Leipziger Universitätsmusik.

== Career ==
Born in Eibenstock, Unger was educated at the Kreuzschule in Dresden, where he was a member of the Kreuzchor under Rudolf Mauersberger, serving as Erster Chorpräfekt (first prefect of the choir) from 1965 to 1967. He studied conducting, including choral conducting, at the Musikhochschule Weimar.

In 1969, Unger founded the Thüringischer Akademischer Singkreis, which he directed until 1996. He subsequently became Kapellmeister and choral conductor of the Philharmonisches Staatsorchester Halle and also served as director of the Singakademie Halle. In recognition of his contributions to the city's musical life, he received Halle's Handel Prize in 1985.

In 1987, Unger was appointed artistic director of the Leipziger Universitätschor. Four years later, in 1991, he became Universitätsmusikdirektor of the University of Leipzig, where he also taught choral conducting at both the Hochschule für Musik und Theater "Felix Mendelssohn Bartholdy" Leipzig and Leipzig University itself.

Following the resignation of Hans-Joachim Rotzsch in 1991, Unger served as interim Thomaskantor. He revitalized Leipziger Universitätsmusik by founding the Pauliner Kammerorchester in 1992 and the Pauliner Barockensemble in 1994, both named in honor of the former Paulinerkirche, which had been demolished by the East German authorities in 1968. Unger was an advocate for the reconstruction of the church during later campus redevelopment discussions. In 2003, he was appointed Außerplanmäßiger Professor (extraordinary professor).

In 2000, Unger recorded secular cantatas by Johann Sebastian Bach with the Leipziger Universitätschor and the Pauliner Barockensemble, including the 1719 Die Zeit, die Tag und Jahre macht, BWV 134a and the 1735 Die Freude reget sich, BWV 36b. The following year, he recorded works by Hugo Distler, such as Liturgische Sätze (Liturgical Movements), with the Leipziger Universitätschor and the Pauliner Kammerorchester.

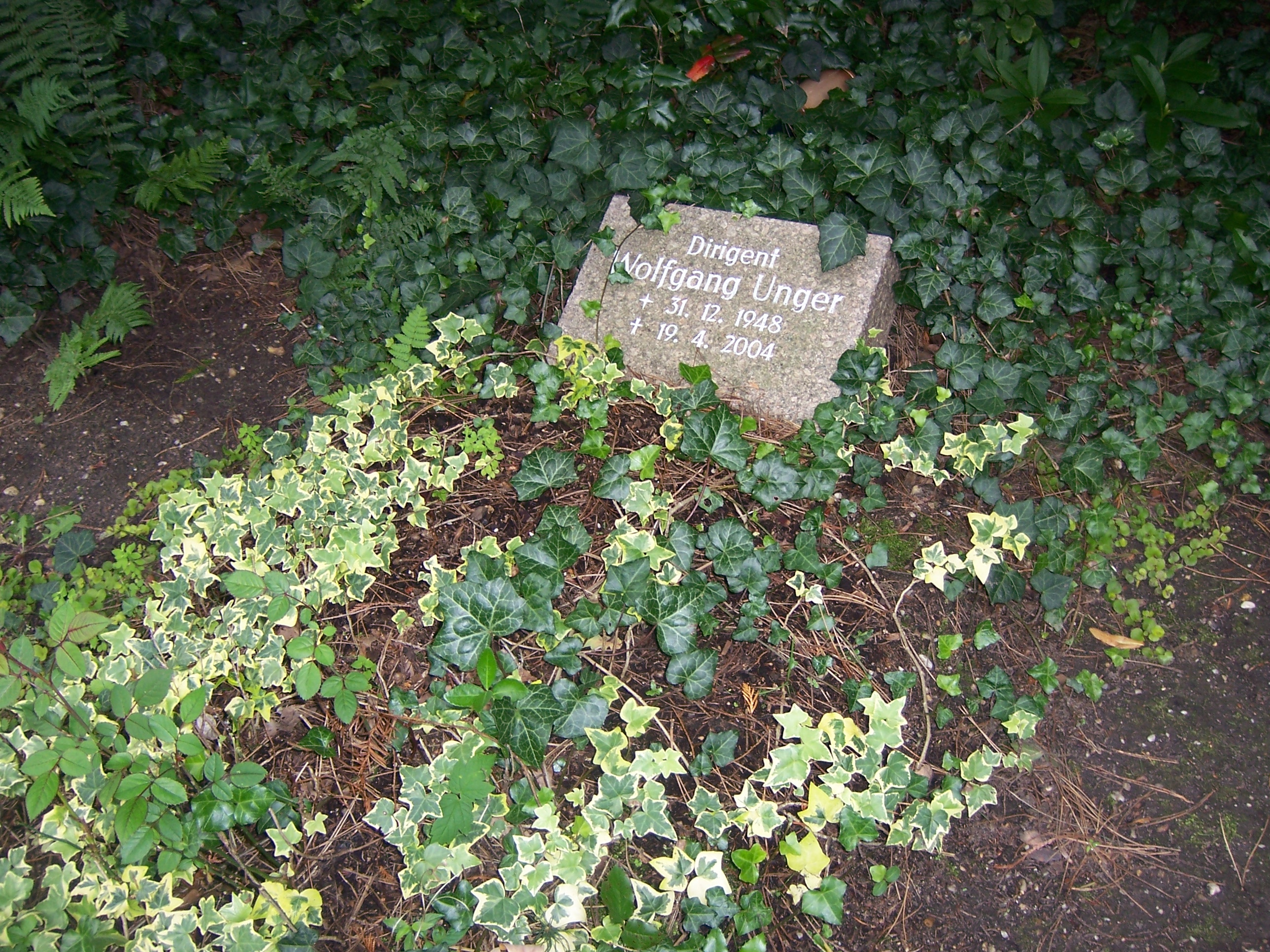
Grave of Wolfgang Unger at the Südfriedhof in Leipzig

Unger died of cancer on 19 April 2004 in Halle (Saale). A memorial service was held on 26 April at the Thomaskirche with three choirs: the Thüringischer Akademischer Singkreis, the Thomanerchor, and the Leipziger Universitätschor. On Totensonntag later that year, a commemorative concert was performed at the Thomaskirche by these ensembles, conducted by Ulf Wellner, with Unger's son Johannes Unger as organist. Wolfgang Unger had often conducted concerts on that day as a personal expression of faith under the GDR regime. His son later published a biography, Wolfgang Unger: Leben für die Musik (Wolfgang Unger: A Life for Music), in 2011.

== Publication ==
- Wege zum Dirigieren. Die Grundlagen der Dirigiertechnik. Edition Merseburger, Kassel 2001, ISBN 3-87537-301-4
