= Johannes Knolleisen =

German theological professor

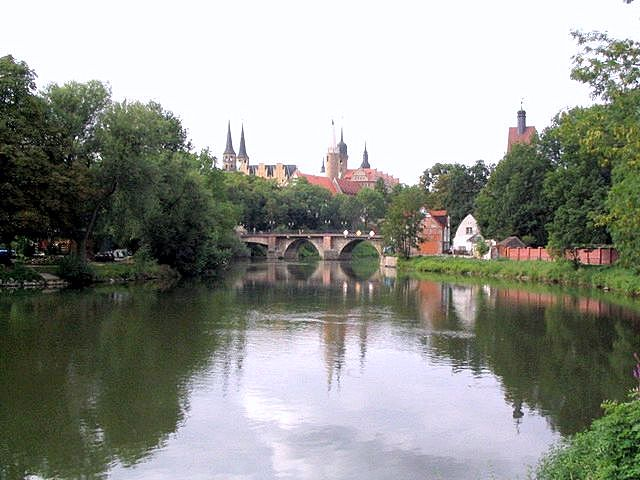
City of Merseburg

Johannes Knolleisen (1450–1513) was a German theological professor.

Nothing is known about his parents and his youth, aside from his being born in Allenstein (Olsztyn), Ermland (Warmia), State of the Teutonic Order. He received his magister degree in theology from the University of Leipzig, becoming rector of the university in 1478. Knolleisen became canon at Merseburg Cathedral in Merseburg in 1489. By the time of his death in 1511, Knolleisen and Lucas David had created a stipend of 700 Rhenish gulden to help two worthy students from Allenstein study in Leipzig.
