= Johann Valentin Görner =

German composer

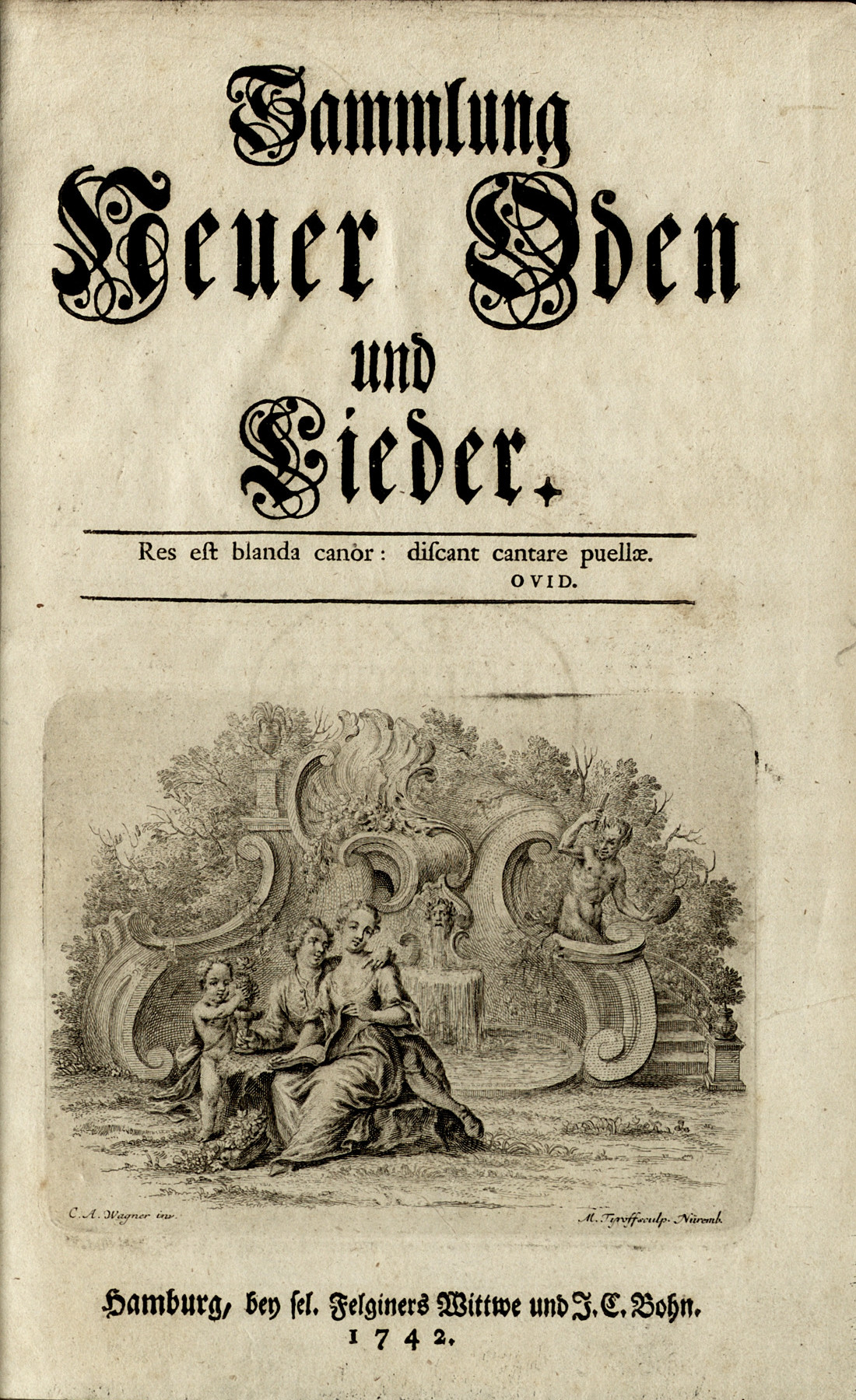
Title page of Sammlung Neuer Oden und Lieder (1742)

Johann Valentin Görner (27 February 1702 – 30 July 1762) was a German composer.

He was born in Penig, Electorate of Saxony. He was the brother of organist Johann Gottlieb Görner. He died, aged 60, in Hamburg.
