= Friedrich Rabenschlag =

German choral conductor

Friedrich Rabenschlag (2 July 1902 – 7 August 1973) was a German choral conductor.

== Career ==
Born in Herford, Rabenschlag studied German studies, art history, musicology and philosophy at the universities of Tübingen, Leipzig and Cologne. He also studied piano, organ, and conducting of both choirs and orchestras at the Landeskonservatorium der Musik zu Leipzig. He was enthusiastic about the Wandervogel movement, and founded the Madrigalkreis Leipziger Studenten in 1926, while studying. It was merged in 1938 with the Heinrich-Schütz-Kantorei to form the Leipziger Universitätschor.

Rabenschlag was appointed church musician (Kantor) of der Paulinerkirche, the university church of Leipzig, in 1933, with the official title Universitätsmusikdirektor from 1939. He rediscovered medieval sacred choral music, performed Bach's oratorios and promoted the works of his contemporary Ernst Pepping. He was also director and conductor of the Leipziger Singakademie from 1947. In 1954, he was appointed professor of the Leipzig University. In 1963, he was awarded an honorary doctorate from the theological faculty of the university.

Rabenschlag died in 1973 in Leipzig and was buried on the Leipzig-Leutzsch cemetery. He was succeeded as choral conductor by Hans-Joachim Rotzsch.

== Literature ==
- Gabriele Baumgartner, Dieter Hebig (ed.): Biographisches Handbuch der SBZ/DDR. 1945–1990. Vol. 2: Maassen – Zylla. K. G. Saur Verlag, Munich 1997, ISBN 3-598-11177-0, p. 678.
