= Johann Philipp Christian Schulz =

German composer and conductor

Johann Philipp Christian Schulz (also Schulze; 24 September 1773 – 30 January 1827) was a German composer and conductor.

Schulz was born in Bad Langensalza and was Gewandhaus Kapellmeister from 1810 to 1827. In 1825 he and the Gewandhaus Orchestra presented the world's first cycle of the nine symphonies of Ludwig van Beethoven. This was repeated in 1826. He also conducted the premieres of Beethoven's "Emperor" Concerto in 1811, and Felix Mendelssohn's Symphony No. 1 in 1827.

He died in Leipzig in 1827, aged 53.
