= Martin Petzoldt =

German Lutheran theologian and academic teacher

- Born: 13 April 1946; Rabenstein, Germany
- Died: 13 March 2015 (aged 68); Leipzig
- Education: Kreuzschule; University of Leipzig
- Occupations: Lutheran theologian; Minister; Academic teacher
- Organizations: University of Leipzig; Neue Bachgesellschaft; Thomaskirche, Leipzig
- Awards: Order of Merit of Germany
- Website: www.martin.petzoldt.eu

Martin Petzoldt (13 April 1946 – 13 March 2015) was a German Lutheran theologian, Bach scholar and academic teacher. He was a professor at the University of Leipzig and president of the Neue Bachgesellschaft.

== Career ==
Petzoldt was born in Rabenstein. He was a member of the Dresdner Kreuzchor under Rudolf Mauersberger. and attended the Kreuzschule He studied theology at the University of Leipzig, graduating in 1969. He was promoted there in 1976 and achieved his habilitation in 1985.

In 1973 he was ordained minister of the Lutheran Church of Saxony. He taught at the University of Leipzig, from 1986 as docent, from 1992 as a professor of systematic theology with a focus on ethics. From 1995 to 2009 he was also Universitätsprediger (university preacher). In that function, he was engaged in the discussions and decisions around the new Paulinum, replacing the former demolished university church Paulinerkirche. He was professor emeritus in 2011.

Petzoldt was one of the editors of a magazine for theological literature, the Theologische Literaturzeitung, until end of 2014. He was also president of the Neue Bachgesellschaft and from 1978 to 2014 on the board of the Thomaskirche.

For the Carus-Verlag, Petzoldt edited a facsimile edition of the seven volumes of libretti of works by Bach which were published between 1724 and 1749, including the Christmas Oratorio. The book was awarded the Deutscher Musikeditions-Preis in the facsimile category in 2001.

In 1998 he was awarded the Cross of the Order of Merit of the Federal Republic of Germany. In 2012 he was diagnosed with leukemia. He died in Leipzig.

== Selected publications ==
- Liturgische und theologische Aspekte zu den Texten der frühesten Kantaten, in Christoph Wolff (ed.): Die Welt der Bach Kantaten, vol. 1 (Stuttgart and Kassell: Bärenreiter, 1996), 119–34.
- Bachstätten. Ein Reiseführer zu Johann Sebastian Bach. Insel, Frankfurt, 2000. ISBN 0-393-04825-X
- Chronicle of the University Church of St Paul (1240–1968)
- Liturgy and Music in Leipzig’s Main Churches 2013
