= Hermann Kretzschmar =

German teacher, performer, musicologist and author (1848–1924)

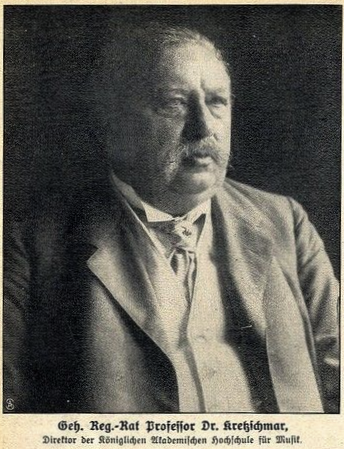
(1912)

August Ferdinand Hermann Kretzschmar (19 January 1848 – 10 May 1924) was a German musicologist and writer, and is considered a founder of hermeneutics in musical interpretation and study.

== Life and career ==
Born in Olbernhau, Saxony, Kretzschmar was son of the organist and cantor Karl Dankegott Kretzschmar and Karoline Wilhelmine, née Leupold. He was from 1862 a student in the Kreuzschule in Dresden, where from 1867–1868 he was twice Prefect of the Dresdner Kreuzchor. In addition, from 1870 he studied Philology at Leipzig University as well as Music at the Leipzig Conservatory and was awarded his doctorate there. From 1871 he was actively teaching in Theory, Composition, Piano and Organ at the Leipzig Conservatory, and acted as director/conductor for various musical societies. In 1876 he spent a year as theatre orchestra conductor in Metz (described as an "adventurous episode"), and undertook research expeditions in England and Italy for the study of musical history; from 1877 to 1887 he was Director of Music at the University of Rostock, and city music director there from 1880.

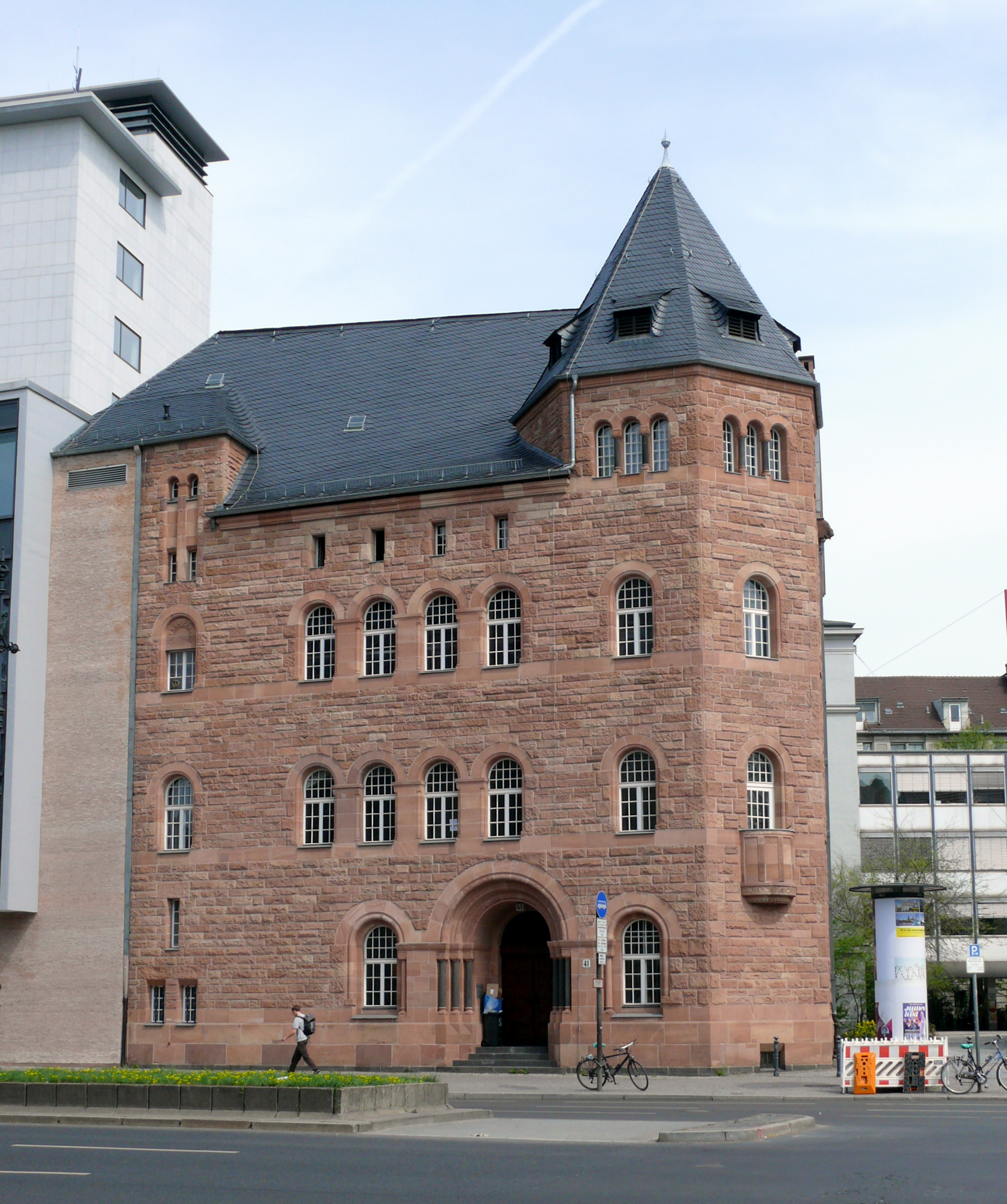
Institute for Church Music, Berlin

From 1887 to 1904 he renewed his position in Leipzig as active University Music Director. From 1888-1898 he was Director of the Riedel Choral Society. In the year 1890 he was awarded an honorary professorship, and in 1890 he founded the Leipzig Academic Concerts which he conducted until 1895. In 1904 he was appointed as regular Professor of Music at the University of Berlin, and from 1907–1922 he was Director of the Royal Institute for Church Music.

From 1909 to 1920 (as successor to Joseph Joachim) he was Director of the Königlich Akademischen Hochschule für ausübende Tonkunst founded in 1869, later the Musikhochschule Berlin (the Berlin High School for Music). In 1912 he was elected Chairman of the de:Preußische Musikgeschichtlichen Kommission (Prussian Music History Commission) and thus the editor of the Denkmäler deutscher Tonkunst. This historical music edition was begun in 1892 by Brahms, Joachim and Philipp Spitta.

He was a government privy counsellor. One of his students was composer and musicologist Walter Niemann. See: List of music students by teacher: K to M#Hermann Kretzschmar.

== Hermeneutics ==
Kretschmar founded the discipline of musical hermeneutics in around 1900.

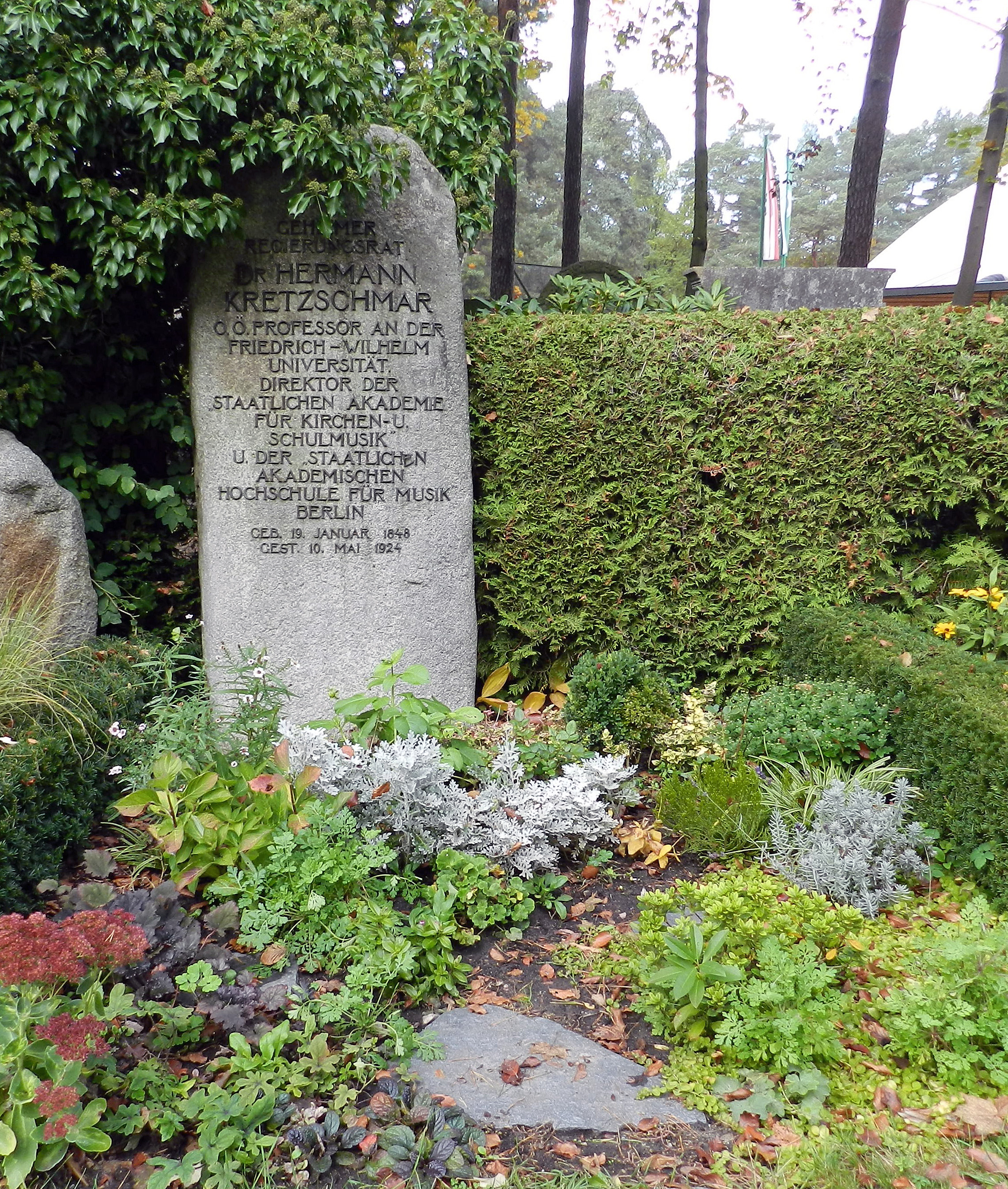
Gravesite of Kretzschmar at the Friedhof Nikolassee in Berlin

According to the musicologist Maria Fuchs,

"The discipline of musical hermeneutics explores the discursive meanings of musical works...[It] concentrates on the "interpretation and paraphrasing of the affects, feelings, expressive characters, and moods" of a piece of music. In contrast to the formal-aesthetic approach to concert music analysis—closely connected to German music critic Eduard Hanslick (1825–1904) and his idea of 'absolute music'—musical hermeneutics was based on an aesthetics of content and affects."

== Death ==
He died in Berlin-Schlachtensee in 1924, after which he was buried in a grave of honour in the de:Protestant Nicholassee churchyard of the de:Kirche Nikolassee in Berlin.

== Personal life ==
Kretzschmar was married in 1880 to the British pianist Clara Meller (Bristol, 3 February 1855 - 6 May 1903, Leipzig). She gave her début concert at the Leipzig Gewandhaus in 1877, and accompanied the Austrian soprano Minna Peschka-Leutner in a number of concerts that year. (Note: At Leipzig, Miss Clara Meller, from London, has made successful débuts, both at a matinée given by the young pianist, and at a concert at the Gewandhaus. The local papers speak highly of the lady's qualifications and versatile talent in interpreting the classical works of the old as well as the modern masters of the art. The debutante was rewarded by frequent marks of approbation on the part of the audience.) (Note: Miss Clara Meller, of London, the accomplished young pianiste, whose successful debut at the Gewandhaus and other concert institutions of Leipzig we have recently had occasion to notice, has since appeared, in company with Mdme. Peschka-Leutner, in a series of concerts given in various parts of Germany and Holland, creating everywhere a most favourable impression upon the audience as to her high qualifications for the instrument of her choice.) In Göttingen in March she played Beethoven's Kreutzer sonata, pieces by Schumann, Liszt and Wagner arr. Tausig, and one or other of Chopin's A-flat major waltzes. (Note: Miss Meller's technique is very worthy of note, but the lady does not yet play artistically, as the execution of her part in Beethoven's Kreutzer Sonata showed; she also seems to have a tendency to rush the tempi, which is what transpired with Schumann's solo pieces. Liszt and Wagner-Tausig were particularly striking, but the A-flat major Waltz by Chopin was barely comprehensible. Since the lady is still young, she can be pull or be pulled. (Miss Meller's Technik ist sehr anerkennenswerth, sein künstlerisch spielt die Dame aber noch nicht, das zeigte die Ausführung ihres Parts in Beethoven's Kreutzer-Sonate, auch hat sie, scheint es, Neigung, die Tempi zu übereilen, was sich bei den Solostücken von Schumann, Liszt und Wagner-Tausig, besonders auffällig aber bei dem Asdur-Walzer von Chopin herausstellte, der kaum zu verstehen war. Da die Dame noch jung ist, kann sie sich auch noch ziehen oder ziehen lassen.)

In October 1878 she played Schumann's Piano Concerto in a concert at the Rostock Konzertverein, conducted by Kretschmar, who was the music director at Rostock University She continued to give concerts after their marriage; her repertoire included Brahms' 2nd piano concerto, Saint-Saëns' second, the concerto for three keyboards, BWV 1064 by J. S. Bach, and the F-sharp minor concerto by Hans von Bronsart. She died aged 48 in Leipzig. They had no children.

== Literary allusion ==
In his novel Doktor Faustus, Thomas Mann creates the character of Dr Wendell Kretzschmar, the inspirational and eccentric musicologist, lecturer and teacher of the composer Adrian Leverkühn. The name is probably given in homage to his real-life contemporary Hermann Kretzschmar, whose essays in musical interpretation were widely read and appreciated around the turn of the twentieth century.

== Works ==
- Führer durch den Konzertsaal (Guide through the Concert Hall). Leipzig (1887–90).
  - Vol. I, Parts 1 & 2: Sinfonie und Suite (Symphonies and Suites). Leipzig: Breitkopf & Härtel (6th edition 1921)
  - Vol. II, Part 1: Kirchliche Werke (Sacred works). Leipzig: Breitkopf & Härtel (5th edition 1921)
  - Vol II, Part 2: Oratorien und weltliche Chorwerke (Oratorios and secular choral works) Leipzig: Breitkopf & Härtel (4th edition 1920)
- Geschichte des neuen deutschen Liedes (History of new German song). (Part I, from Albert to Zelter only completed - mainly 17th and 18th centuries). Leipzig: Breitkopf & Härtel (1911).
- Gesammelte Aufsätze über Musik und Anderes (Collected Essays on music and other subjects) - Leipzig: Breitkopf & Härtel, and C. F. Peters
  - Volume I: Gesammelte Aufsätze über Musik aus den Grenzboten (Collected Essays on Music from the journal Die Grenzboten). Leipzig: Breitkopf & Härtel (1910, 2nd ed. 1911)
  - Volume II: Gesammelte Aufsätze aus den Jahrbüchern der Musikbibliothek Peters (Collected Essays from the Peters Music Library Yearbook). Leipzig, C. F. Peters (1911)
  - A projected Volume III: Gesammelte Aufsätze über Musik aus den Verlag Breitkopf & Härtel seems not to have appeared in print.
- Geschichte der Oper (History of Opera). Leipzig: Breitkopf & Härtel (1919)
- Einführung in die Musikgeschichte (Introduction to the History of Music), 1920
