= Werner Fabricius =

German composer and organist

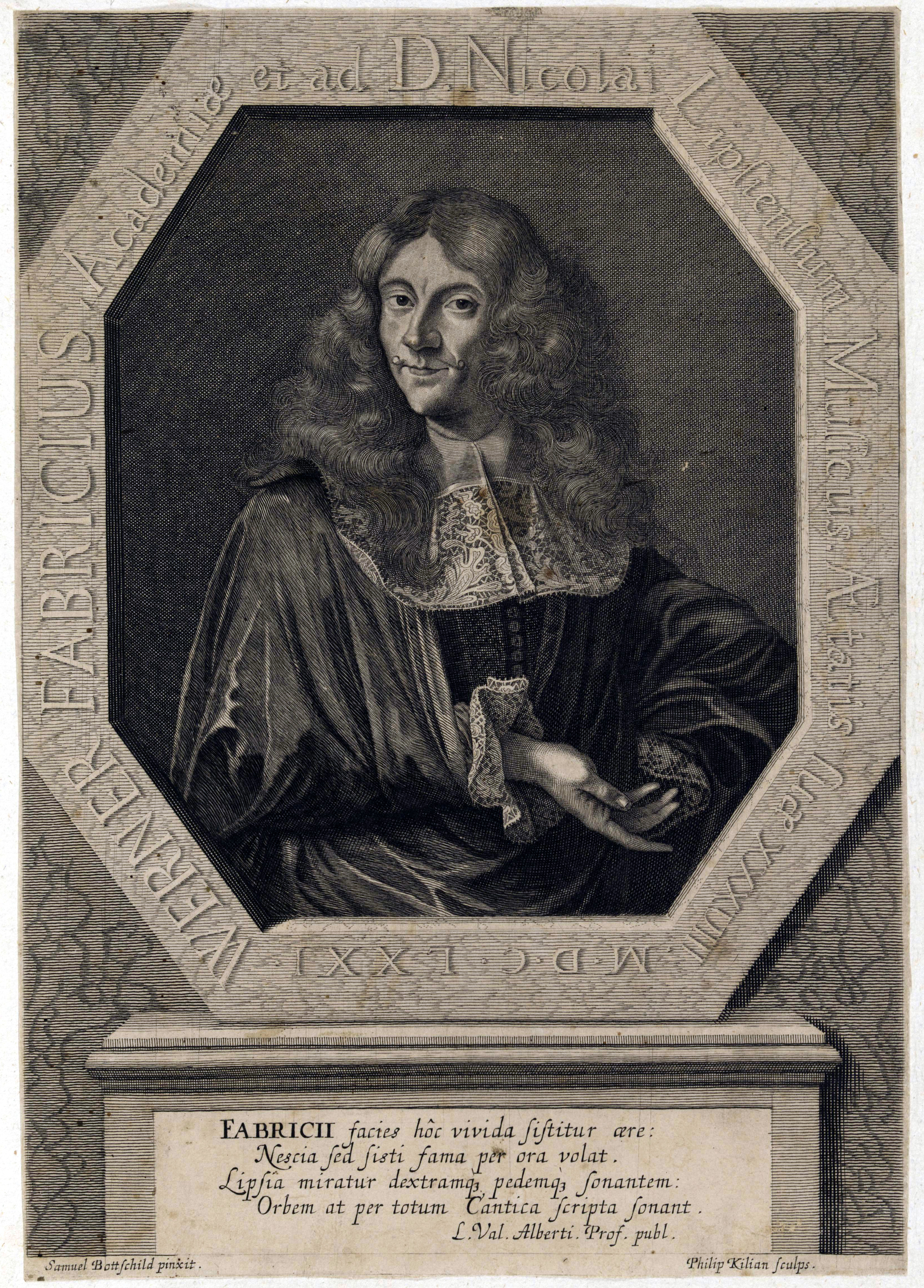
Fabricius Werner

Fabricius Werner (1633-1679), an organist and composer of note, was born on 10 April 1633 in Itzehoe, Holstein. As a boy he studied music under his father, Albert Fabricius, organist in Flensburg, and Paul Moth, the Cantor there. He went to the Gymnasium in Hamburg, where Thomas Selle and Heinrich Scheidemann were his teachers in music. In 1650 he went to the Leipzig University, studying philosophy, theology, and law; in the latter he became a fully qualified 'Notar.' He was appointed Musik-Director of the Paulinerkirche, Leipzig, in 1656, and in 1658 was also appointed organist to the Nicolaikirche. Although he tried for the post of Cantor to the Thomaskirche in March 1658, he was not elected. He was married on 3 July 1665, and one son survived him, Johann Albert Fabricius. He died on 9 January 1679 in Leipzig, forty-five years old, according to the contemporary account of him in Musica Davidica, order Davids Music, bei der Leichbe-stattung des ... Hern Werneri Fabricii ... durch Joh. Thilone, ad S. Nicolaum Ecclesiaste.
