= Ernst Richter =

German musical theorist (1808–1879)

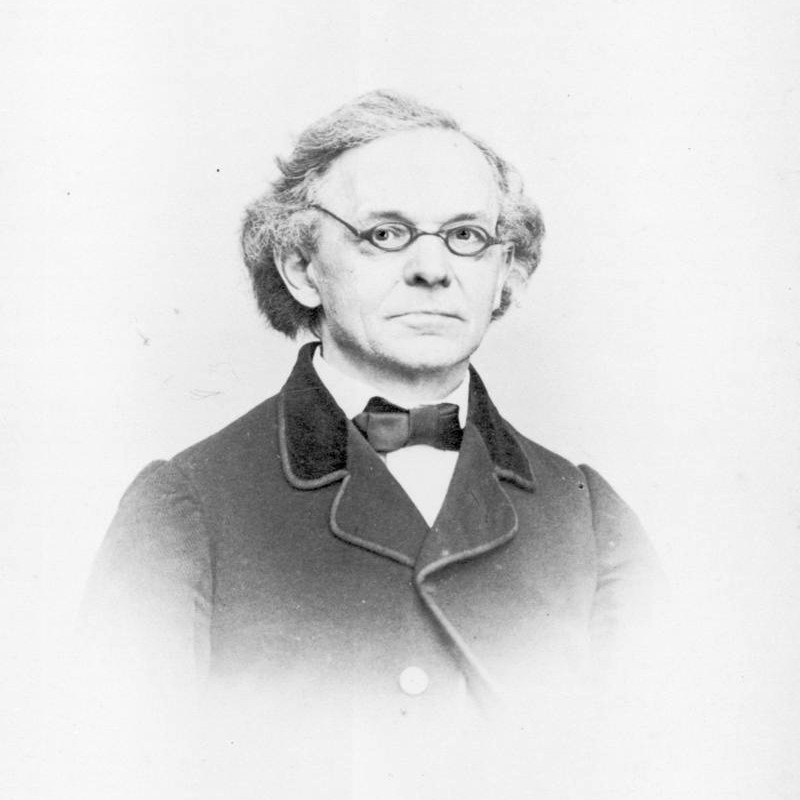

Ernst Friedrich Eduard Richter (24 October 1808 – 9 April 1879), was a German musical theorist and composer, born at Großschönau, Saxony.

He first studied music at Zittau, and afterwards at Leipzig, where he attained so high a reputation that in 1843 he was appointed professor of harmony and counterpoint at the conservatorium of music, then newly founded by Felix Mendelssohn. On the death of Moritz Hauptmann on 3 January 1868, he was elected cantor of Thomasschule zu Leipzig, conducting the Thomanerchor, an office he retained until his death.

He is best known by three theoretical works: Lehrbuch der Harmonie, Lehrbuch des einfachen und doppelten Contrapunkts and Lehrbuch der Fuge, valuable textbooks known to English students through the translation by J.C.D Parker and Franklin Taylor.

"Ernst Friedrich [Eduard] Richter [(1808-1879)]...His compositions include psalms for chorus and orchestra, motets, two masses, a Stabat Mater (voices only), part songs, string quartets and sonatas, and also pieces for organ and for piano. But it is his treatise on the theory of music that will keep Professor Richter's name from oblivion. As already mentioned, two English editions have appeared: one in London (printed without Richter's leave, by the way) by Mr. Franklin Taylor, which must by no means be accepted as a translation, but merely as a very moderate adaptation; the other, unfortunately little known in this country, printed with Richter's consent by John P. Morgan, in New York. The latter translation is most carefully done, and forms a strong contrast to the English edition. On last Good Friday, the 150th anniversary of the first production of Bach's Matthew Passion, the dear old cantor and beloved professor [Richter] was laid to his last rest, accompanied to his grave by the solemn sound of the beautiful choral, Jesu, meine Zuversicht. More hearty regret has rarely filled the hearts of those standing round a musician's grave. Once more the voices of his choir arose in Bach's beautiful melody to Wenn ich eimmal soil scheiden, and then with a last look at his coffin the crowd dispersed. But though gone to his last rest, the memory of many of us will long cherish, as one of the truest artists, most thorough musicians and excellent teachers, that we have ever met, the name of Ernst Friedrich Richter."

== Textbooks ==
- Die Grundzüge der musikalischen Formen und ihre Analyse, Leipzig: Georg Wigand, 1852.
- Lehrbuch der Harmonie, Leipzig: Breitkopf und Härtel, 1853.
- Lehrbuch der Fuge, Leipzig: Breitkopf und Härtel, 1859.
- Katechismus der Orgel, Leipzig: J. J. Weber, 1868.
- Lehrbuch des einfachen und doppelten Contrapunkts, Leipzig: Breitkopf und Härtel, 1872.
