= Johann Gottlieb Görner =

German composer and organist (1697–1778)

Johann Gottlieb Görner (16 April 1697 – 15 February 1778) was a German composer and organist.

== Biography ==
Görner was born in Penig, Saxony. His brother was the composer Johann Valentin Görner and his son the organist Karl Friedrich Görner. He was a student at the Thomasschule zu Leipzig and University of Leipzig, then organist of the city's Paulinerkirche from 1716 (whose music director he became in 1723) then its Nikolaikirche from 1721. In 1723 he founded a Collegium Musicum, which competed with Johann Sebastian Bach's. He died in Leipzig.
