= Hans-Joachim Rotzsch =

- Born: 25 April 1929; Bad Gandersheim, Germany
- Died: 25 September 2013 (aged 84); Leipzig, Germany
- Education: Musikhochschule Leipzig
- Occupations: Choral conductor; Thomaskantor; Academic teacher
- Organization: Thomanerchor

Hans-Joachim Rotzsch (25 April 1929 – 25 September 2013) was a German choral conductor, conducting the Thomanerchor from 1972 until 1991 as the fifteenth Thomaskantor since Johann Sebastian Bach. He was also a tenor and an academic teacher.

== Biography ==
Hans-Joachim Rotzsch was born in Leipzig and educated from 1940 to 1945 at the Musisches Gymnasium Frankfurt, directed by Kurt Thomas. In 1949 he began to study church music at the Hochschule für Musik und Theater "Felix Mendelssohn Bartholdy" Leipzig, learning organ with Günther Ramin.

Rotzsch became known as an oratorio tenor. In 1972 he was appointed professor at the Felix Mendelssohn-Bartholdy Hochschule. From 1972 until 1991 he was the Thomaskantor, as the 15th successor of Bach in this position. He was a Stasi informer from 1973 onward.

In 1992 he became a guest professor for Protestant church music at the Mozarteum University of Salzburg, where he taught until 2000.

== Literature ==
- Kurt Meyer: Der Fünfzehnte nach Bach. Thomaskantor Hans Joachim Rotzsch; Schkeuditzer Buchverlag, 2002; ISBN 3-9806705-4-6
- Corinna Wörner:Zwischen Kulturpflege und Kulturpropaganda – Thomaner- und Kreuzchor als Kulturbotschafter der DDR, in: Ritter, Rüdiger (Hg.): Musik und ihre gesellschaftliche Bedeutung in den staats- und postsozialistischen Ländern Mittel- und Osteuropas seit 1945, (Ostmitteleuropa interdisziplinär, Bd. 3), Wiesbaden 2023, p. 217–235, ISBN 978-3-447-12113-2.

== Recordings ==
- Bach Made in Germany Vol. 1 – Cantatas II – Boy soprano, Hans-Joachim Rotzsch (tenor), Hans Hauptmann, Thomanerchor, Gewandhausorchester, conductor Günther Ramin, Leipzig Classics
- Bach: Ich hatte viel Bekümmernis, BWV 21, Arleen Augér, Peter Schreier, Siegfried Lorenz, Thomanerchor Leipzig, Neues Bachisches Collegium Musicum, 1981–83
- Bach: Der Himmel lacht! Die Erde jubilieret, BWV 31 / Erfreut euch, ihr Herzen, BWV 66, Helga Termer, Heidi Rieß, Eberhard Büchner, Siegfried Lorenz, Hermann Christian Polster, Thomanerchor, Gewandhausorchester
