= Max Pommer =

German musicologist and conductor

- Born: 9 February 1936; Eibenstock, Germany
- Education: Thomasschule; Musikhochschule Leipzig; Leipzig University
- Occupations: Conductor; Academic
- Organizations: Leipziger Universitätschor; Neues Bachisches Collegium Musicum; Leipzig University
- Awards: Kunstpreis der DDR; Nationalpreis der DDR; Deutscher Schallplattenpreis; Biermann-Ratjen-Medaille

Max Pommer (born 9 February 1936) is a German musicologist and conductor, a director of the Leipziger Universitätschor and the founder and conductor of the Neues Bachisches Collegium Musicum.

== Career ==
Born in Leipzig, Pommer was a student of the Thomasschule in his home town, where he founded a chamber orchestra. He studied conducting and piano at the Musikhochschule Leipzig, and from 1960 to 1964 also musicology at the Leipzig University. He was the conductor of the Leipziger Universitätschor from 1973 to 1987. He founded in 1979 the Neues Bachisches Collegium Musicum, formed by players of the Gewandhausorchester, which gained him international recognition and awards. In 1980, he was appointed professor at the Leipzig University.

From 1987 to 1991, Pommer was Generalmusikdirektor of the MDR Sinfonieorchester. He was the conductor of the Hamburger Camerata from 2001 to 2011, when he celebrated his 75th birthday.

== Awards ==
- 1979: Kunstpreis der DDR
- 1985: Nationalpreis der DDR für Kunst und Literatur, III. Klasse
- 1985: Deutscher Schallplattenpreis
- 2011: Biermann-Ratjen-Medaille of Hamburg

== Literature ==
- Horst Riedel: Stadtlexikon Leipzig von A bis Z. Pro Leipzig, Leipzig 2005, ISBN 3-936508-03-8.
- Thomas Wolter: Hecht im Karpfenteich interview in alla breve – Magazin der Hochschule des Saarlandes für Musik und Theater, 8. Jahrgang (2003), H. 1, p 16 f
