= Neues Bachisches Collegium Musicum =

Orchestra

- Chamber orchestra
- Founded: 1979
- Location: Leipzig

Neues Bachisches Collegium Musicum (NBCM, New Bach's Collegium Musicum) is a German chamber orchestra, founded in Leipzig, Saxony. It follows the tradition of collegia musica, developed by Johann Sebastian Bach, also in Leipzig. The orchestra is dedicated to historically informed performances, based on the latest research.

== History ==
Neues Bachisches Collegium Musicum was founded in 1979 by Max Pommer and Walter Heinz Bernstein. All musicians are members of the Gewandhausorchester. The ensemble collaborates with the Bach Archive in applying historical research to performances with modern instruments.

The name refers to the Collegium Musicum which Georg Philipp Telemann founded in 1701 at the Leipzig University, and which Bach directed from 1729. The ensemble, subsequently called Bachisches Collegium, played Bach's works regularly at Zimmermannsches Kaffeehaus, including secular cantatas and instrumental works such as the Coffee Cantata, which Bach had composed for the ensemble.

Pommer was the first musical director of the NBCM. They produced many recordings and won international recognition and awards such as the 1985 Preis der Deutschen Schallplattenkritik for a recording of Bach's Brandenburg Concertos. They have recorded with Ludwig Güttler, the harpsichordist Christine Schornsheim and the Thomanerchor, among others.

Pommer was succeeded in 1988 by the oboist Burkhard Glaetzner. He added to the repertory, including works of the Classical period. From 2003 to 2013, the violinist and academic Albrecht Winter directed the NBCM, returning to the Baroque repertory, including works by Vivaldi, Corelli, Telemann, Bach's sons, and composers from the early days of the Gewandhaus. In a concert series from 2009 to 2011, the NBCM played the Gewandhaus programs which had been given 225 years earlier in the same hall, based on historic Programmzettel. The first such concert had been held in 2006 when the NBCM played the program of the first concert in the Gewandhaus in 1781, as the final concert of the Gewandhaus-Festwochen for the 225th anniversary of the house.

From 2013, the NBCM has had no single artistic director, but has worked with conductors such as Georg Kallweit and Stephan Mai (Akademie für Alte Musik Berlin) and Nadja Zwiener (The English Concert). They perform the series Bachische Abend-Musicken, in collaboration with the town's historic museum Stadtgeschichtliches Museum Leipzig in the hall (Festsaal) of the Old Town Hall.
