= Jesu, der du meine Seele, BWV 78 =

1641 Lutheran hymn in German

Jesu, der du meine Seele
- BWV 78
- Chorale cantata by J. S. Bach
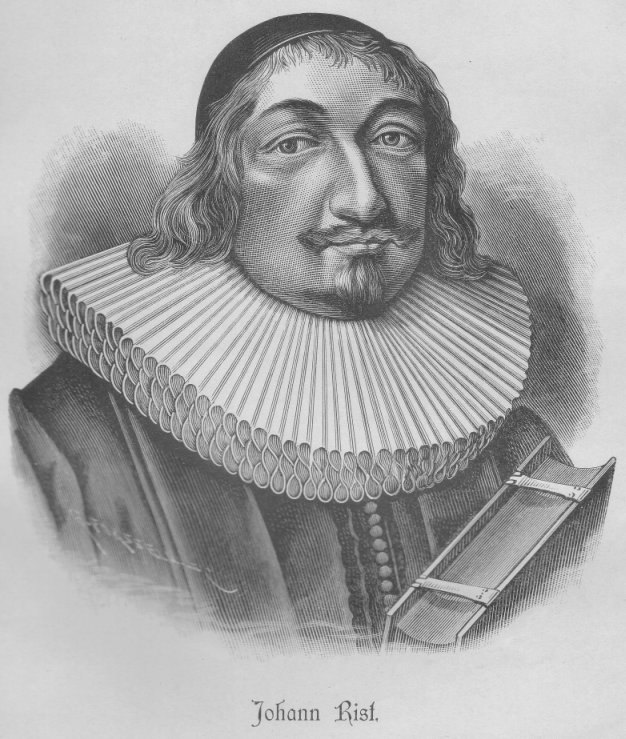
- Johann Rist, the author of the hymn
- Occasion: 14th Sunday after Trinity
- Chorale: "Jesu, der du meine Seele" by Johann Rist
- Performed: 10 September 1724: Leipzig
- Movements: seven
- Vocal: SATB choir and solo
- Instrumental: horn; flauto traverso; 2 oboes; 2 violins; viola; violone; continuo

Jesu, der du meine Seele (Jesus, you who [rescued] my soul), BWV 78, is a church cantata by Johann Sebastian Bach. He composed it in Leipzig for the 14th Sunday after Trinity and first performed it on 10 September 1724. It is based on the 1641 hymn by Johann Rist, "Jesu, der du meine Seele", for which it is named. The topic of the chorale, the Passion of Jesus cleansing the believer, is only distantly related to the Sunday's readings.

Jesu, der du meine Seele belongs to Bach's chorale cantata cycle, the second cycle during his tenure as Thomaskantor that began in 1723. The text retains the first and last stanza of the hymn unchanged, while the text of the inner stanzas was paraphrased by an unknown librettist into a sequence of five movements of alternating arias and recitatives, retaining several more lines from the original chorale. The first movement is a chorale fantasia in passacaglia form, and the work is closed by a four-part chorale setting.

The cantata is scored for four vocal soloists, a four-part choir, and a Baroque instrumental ensemble of flauto traverso, two oboes, strings and basso continuo, with a horn in the opening chorus. Bach achieved expression of contrasting affects in dramatic recitatives, anguish in "contrapuntal density" and accessible arias illustrating hope.

== History and words ==
Bach composed Jesu, der du meine Seele in his second year in Leipzig when he wrote an annual cycle of chorale cantatas. For the 14th Sunday after Trinity, 10 September 1724, he chose the chorale of Johann Rist, "Jesu, der du meine Seele", in 12 stanzas, published in 1641. Rist wrote the text and probably also the melody. The prescribed readings for the Sunday were from the Epistle to the Galatians, Paul's teaching on "works of the flesh" and "fruit of the Spirit" (Galatians 5:16–24), and from the Gospel of Luke, Cleansing ten lepers (Luke 17:11–19). The chorale seems only distantly related, dealing with the Passion of Jesus, which cleanses the believer.

An unknown librettist wrote the poetry for seven movements, retaining the first and last stanza for choral movements unchanged, and paraphrased the inner stanzas into a sequence of recitatives and arias, retaining some original lines. The second movement 2 corresponds to stanza 2 of the chorale, the third to stanzas 3–5, the fourth to stanzas 6–7, the fifth to stanzas 8–10, and the sixth to stanza 11. The poet referred to sickness and healing in a few lines, more than the chorale does, such as "Du suchst die Kranken" (you search for the sick).

Bach led the Thomanerchor in the first performance on 10 September 1724. An additional autograph flauto traverso part indicates at another performance between 1736–1740, an autograph violone part a performance after 1745. The cantata was performed again around 1755 when C. F. Barth and C. F. Penzel were interim music directors.

== Music ==
=== Structure and scoring ===
Bach structured the cantata in seven movements and scored it for four vocal soloists (soprano, alto, tenor and bass), a four-part choir, and a Baroque instrumental ensemble of a horn (Co) to reinforce the chorale tune in the outer movements, flauto traverso (Ft), two oboes (Ob), two violins (Vl), viola (Va), violone (Vo) and basso continuo, including pipe organ.

In the following table of the movements, the scoring, keys and time signatures are taken from Alfred Dürr's Die Kantaten von J. S. Bach, using the symbol for common time (4/4). The instruments are shown separately for winds and strings, while the continuo, playing throughout, is not shown.

Movements of Jesu, der du meine Seele
No.	Title	Text	Type	Vocal	Winds	Strings	Key	Time
1	Jesu, der du meine Seele	Rist	Chorus	SATB	Co Ft 2Ob	2Vl Va	G minor	3/4
2	Wir eilen mit schwachen, doch emsigen Schritten	anon.	Aria / duet	S A		Vo	B-flat major	common time
3	Ach! ich bin ein Kind der Sünden	anon.	Recitative	T				common time
4	Das Blut, so meine Schuld durchstreicht	anon.	Aria	T	Ft		G minor	6/8
5	Die Wunden, Nägel, Kron und Grab	anon.	Recitative	B		2Vl Va		common time
6	Nur du wirst mein Gewissen stillen	anon.	Aria	B	Ob	2Vl Va	C minor	common time
7	Herr, ich glaube, hilf mir Schwachen	Rist	Chorale	SATB	Co Ft 2Ob	2Vl Va	G minor	common time

=== Movements ===
The cantata is remarkable for its widely contrasting affects, painful intensity in "contrapuntal density" in the opening, accessible music in the arias, and dramatic intensity in the recitatives. John Eliot Gardiner who conducted the Bach Cantata Pilgrimage in 2000 noted that "an exceptional level of inspiration is maintained through all its movements".

==== 1 ====
The opening chorus, "Jesu, der du meine Seele ... herausgerissen" (Jesus, you, who my soul ... powerfully rescued). is a chorale fantasia in the form of a passacaglia. The theme, known as passus duriusculus or chromatic fourth, appears 27 times, sometimes reversed, sometimes in different keys. It is also used in the upper parts and in the voices. In the first pages it appears twice in the bass (bars 1–9), then at the top of the texture played by the first oboe at bar 9. It appears in inverted form sung by the choir altos at bar 25 and, a bar later, by the tenors. The theme is understood as a symbol of anguish.

This passacaglia bass was already in use before Bach. He had used it first in movement 5 of his early cantata for Easter Christ lag in Todes Banden, BWV 4, and notably in Weinen, Klagen, Sorgen, Zagen, BWV 12, which was a model for the Crucifixus of his Mass in B minor.

The movement falls into sections for the lines of the chorale. Each section builds up from imitative entrances of the choir's lower voices leading to the sopranos singing the hymn tune as a cantus firmus. A variety of motifs is used in the instrumental and lower vocal parts to express the meaning of the words, following the doctrine of the affections, which stated that specific emotions could be aroused by appropriate musical gestures.

Gardiner wrote that the movement compares to the opening movements of both the St John Passion and the St Matthew Passion in "scale, intensity and power of expression".

==== 2 ====
The duet for soprano and alto, "Wir eilen mit schwachen, doch emsigen Schritten, o Jesu, o Meister, zu helfen zu dir" (We hasten with weak, yet eager steps, O Jesus, O Master, to you for help), speaks of rushing steps, shown predominantly in the figures of the continuo. Gardiner described it as "smile-inducing music".

==== 3 ====
The tenor recitative, "Ach! ich bin ein Kind der Sünden" (Alas! I am a child of sin), begins and ends with lines quoted from the chorale. It begins secco, but ends in an arioso. The tenor voice in Bach's works often stands for the "sinful human being"; the music expresses awareness of sinfulness in "audacious harmonies", according to Ulrich Leininger writing for Carus-Verlag.

==== 4 ====
The aria, again for tenor, "Das Blut, so meine Schuld durchstreicht, macht mir das Herze wieder leicht" (The blood that cancels my guilt makes my heart light again), is accompanied by flute motifs to express the relief of the heart.

==== 5 ====
The recitative for bass, "Die Wunden, Nägel, Kron und Grab" (The wounds, nails, crown and grave), is accompanied by strings, reminiscent of the vox Christi (voice of Christ) in Bach's St Mathew Passion. It is marked with unusual precision: vivace, adagio, andante, con ardore. Bach achieved a dramatic impact, intensified by leaps in the vocal line. The end is a prayer set as an arioso with allusions to the chorale tune.

==== 6 ====
The last aria, also for bass, "Nun du wirst mein Gewissen stillen" (Now you will still my conscience), is similar to a concerto for oboe and the voice.

==== 7 ====
The closing chorale, "Herr, ich glaube, hilf mir Schwachen, laß mich ja verzagen nicht" (Lord, I believe, help my weakness, let me never despair), sets the original tune for four parts. The instruments play colla parte with the voices.

== Manuscripts and publication ==
The cantata's autograph score is lost. The first set of parts, copied essentially by Johann Andreas Kuhnau and Christian Gottlob Meißner with Bach supervising, was inherited by Anna Magdalena Bach and belonged to the Thomasschule already in 1750. It is held by the Bach Archive. Flute parts for movements 1 and 7 were added only for a performance after 1735.

The cantata was first published in 1870 in the first complete edition of Bach's work, the Bach-Gesellschaft Ausgabe. The volume in question was edited by Thomaskantor Wilhelm Rust. In the Neue Bach-Ausgabe it was published in 1958, edited by Werner Neumann, with a critical report following in 1959.

== Recordings ==
A list of recordings is provided on the Bach Cantatas Website. Choirs singing with one voice per part (OVPP) and ensembles playing period instruments in historically informed performances are shown with a green background.

Recordings of Jesu, der du meine Seele
Title	Conductor / Choir / Orchestra	Soloists	Label	Year	Choir type	Orch. type
Les Grandes Cantates de J. S. Bach Vol. 7	Fritz Werner Heinrich-Schütz-Chor Heilbronn Pforzheim Chamber Orchestra	soprano soloist from choir; Marga Höffgen; Helmut Krebs; Franz Kelch	Erato	1960		
Bach Cantatas Vol. 4 – Sundays after Trinity	Karl Richter Münchener Bach-Chor Münchener Bach-Orchester	Ursula Buckel; Hertha Töpper; John van Kesteren; Kieth Engen	Archiv Produktion	1961		
J. S. Bach: Cantatas BWV 78 & BWV 106	Wolfgang Gönnenwein Süddeutscher Madrigalchor Consortium Musicum	Edith Mathis; Sybil Michelow; Theo Altmeyer; Franz Crass	EMI	1965		
Bach: Das Kantatenwerk (7)	Hermann Max Dormagener Kantorei Collegium Instrumentale Köln	Barbara Schlick; Hilke Helling; Lutz-Michael Harder; Berthold Possemeyer	FSM Candide	1975		Period
J. S. Bach: Das Kantatenwerk • Complete Cantatas • Les Cantates, Folge / Vol. 20	Nikolaus Harnoncourt Tölzer Knabenchor Concentus Musicus Wien	Wilhelm Wiedl, soloist of the Tölzer Knabenchor; Paul Esswood; Kurt Equiluz; Ruud van der Meer	Teldec	1977		Period
Cantatas BWV 172 & BWV 78	Erhard Mauersberger Thomanerchor Gewandhausorchester	Adele Stolte; Annelies Burmeister; Peter Schreier; Theo Adam	Eterna	1978		
Die Bach Kantate Vol. 10	Helmuth Rilling Gächinger Kantorei Bach-Collegium Stuttgart	Arleen Augér; Carolyn Watkinson; Aldo Baldin; Wolfgang Schöne	Hänssler	1979		
Bach: Das Kantatenwerk (7)	Joshua Rifkin The Bach Ensemble	Julianne Baird; Allan Fast; Frank Kelley; Jan Opalach	Florilegium Digital	1988	OVPP	Period
Bach Edition Vol. 12 – Cantatas Vol. 6	Pieter Jan Leusink Holland Boys Choir Netherlands Bach Collegium	Ruth Holton; Sytse Buwalda; Nico van der Meel; Bas Ramselaar	Brilliant Classics	1999		Period
Bach Cantatas Vol. 7: Ambronay / Bremen	John Eliot Gardiner Monteverdi Choir English Baroque Soloists	Malin Hartelius; Robin Tyson; James Gilchrist; Peter Harvey	Soli Deo Gloria	2000		Period
J. S. Bach: Complete Cantatas Vol. 12	Ton Koopman Amsterdam Baroque Orchestra & Choir	Lisa Larsson; Annette Markert; Christoph Prégardien; Klaus Mertens	Antoine Marchand	2000		Period
J. S. Bach: Cantatas Vol. 25 – Cantatas from Leipzig 1724 (BWV 78, 99, 114)	Masaaki Suzuki Bach Collegium Japan	Yukari Nonoshita; Daniel Taylor; Makoto Sakurada; Peter Kooy	BIS	2003		Period
Bach: Wie schön leuchtet der Morgenstern – Cantata BWV 1, 48, 78 & 140	Karl-Friedrich Beringer Windsbacher Knabenchor Deutsche Kammer-Virtuosen Berlin	Sibylla Rubens; Rebecca Martin; Markus Schäfer; Klaus Mertens	Sony Music	2011		
