= Gerda Schriever =

German contralto (1928–2014)

- Born: 27 August 1928; Leipzig, Germany
- Died: 30 May 2014 (aged 85); Leipzig, Germany
- Occupations: Contralto; Academic teacher
- Organizations: Thomanerchor; University of Music and Theatre Leipzig

Gerda Schriever (27 August 1928 – 30 May 2014) was a German contralto in oratorio and recital, and an academic teacher. She appeared for decades with the Thomanerchor in Leipzig, also recording and for broadcast. She appeared at international festivals. Schriever was an academic voice teacher at the University of Music and Theatre Leipzig.

== Life ==
Schriever was born in Leipzig, the daughter of Fritz Schriever who was a teacher at the Thomasschule when Gustav Schreck and Karl Straube were Thomaskantor. She was exposed to the weekly Motette of the Thomanerchor early. From age 16, she was a in the Gewandhaus Chor and performed with conductors such as Hermann Abendroth and Günther Ramin. She studied voice at the Musikhochschule Leipzig from 1948 to 1953. She appeared already during her studies as a soloist with Diethard Hellmann, in 1951 in Bach's Christmas Oratorio and in 1952 in his St John Passion. She gave a first Lieder recital in Leipzig when she received the Carl Maria von Weber Prize for Lied interpretation in 1952. In 1953, she was awarded the prize for best German singer at the Geneva International Music Competition.

From 1954 onwards, she was soloist of the Thomanerchor for more than two decades, with Ramin, Kurt Thomas, Erhard Mauersberger and Hans-Joachim Rotzsch. With Mauersberger and the Gewandhausorchester, she performed several Bach cantatas at the Thomaskirche which were broadcast by East German Radio. In 1967, she appeared in a broadcast of the Christmas Oratorio, alongside Adele Stolte, Rotzsch and Hermann Christian Polster. With these soloists, she was a member of the Leipzig Bach Soloists from 1968 to 1972.

Schriever also performed with the Dresdner Kreuzchor, conducted by Rudolf Mauersberger and then Martin Flämig, She sang cantatas and oratorios in Germany and abroad and took part in Bach and Handel festivals as well as radio and record recordings. She was also internationally renowned as a lied singer.

Schriever taught singing at the University of Music and Theatre Leipzig. In 1992, she was appointed honorary professor. Among her students was Gotthold Schwarz.

Schriever was married to the pianist Hans-Joachim Drechsel. The couple had three children. She died in Leipzig at the age of 85. The Thomanerchor performed at her funeral.
