= St. Peter, Syburg =

St. Peter
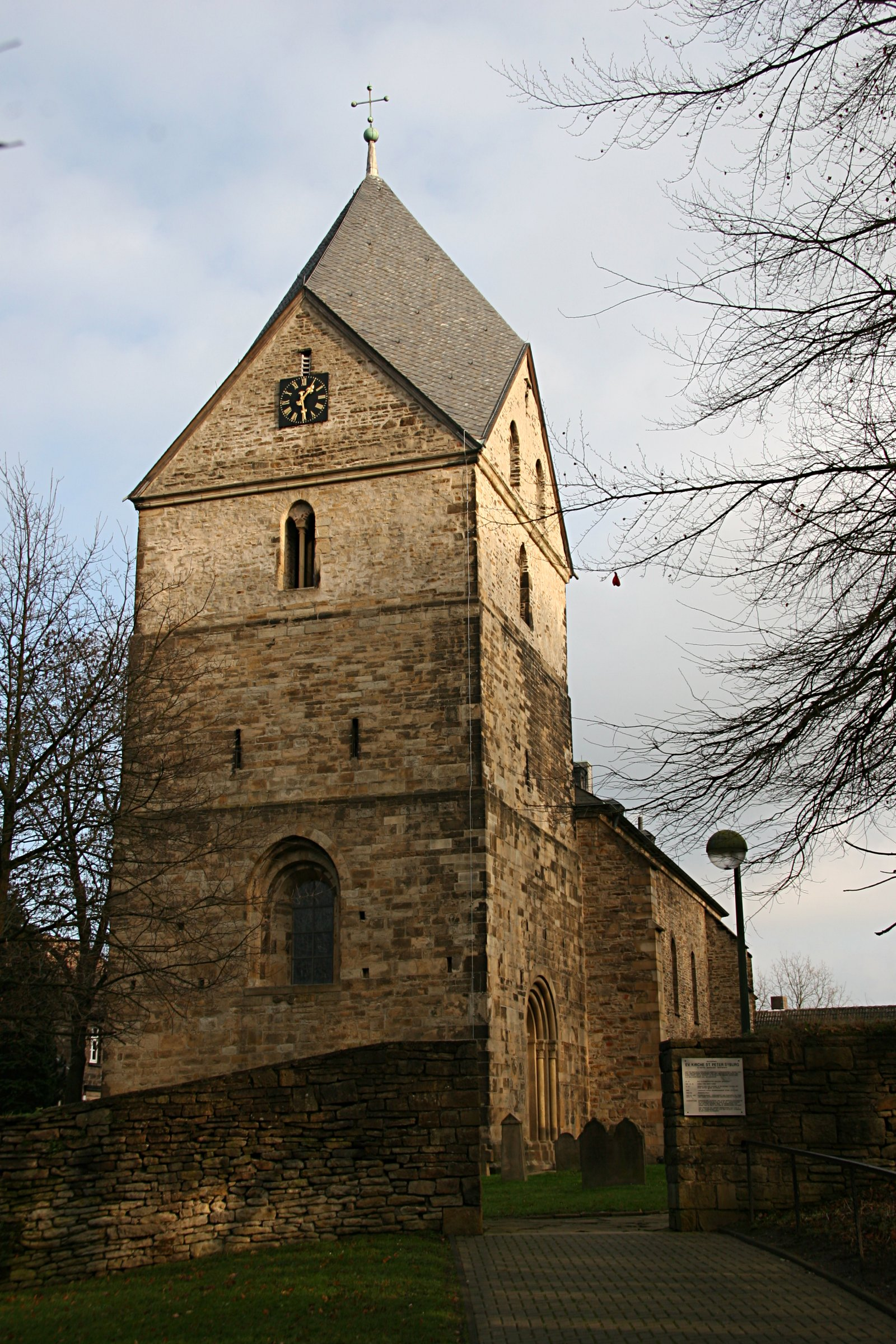
- St. Peter in 2006

- 51°25′21″N 07°29′24″E
- Location: Dortmund-Syburg, Northrhine-Westphalia
- Country: Germany
- Denomination: Protestant
- Previous denomination: Catholic
- Website: www.syburg.de/sy-kirche-st-peter.htm

History
- Consecrated: 799

Architecture
- Architectural type: Fortified church
- Style: Romanesque
- Completed: 12th century

Administration
- Parish: Ev. Kirche St. Peter zu Dortmund-Syburg

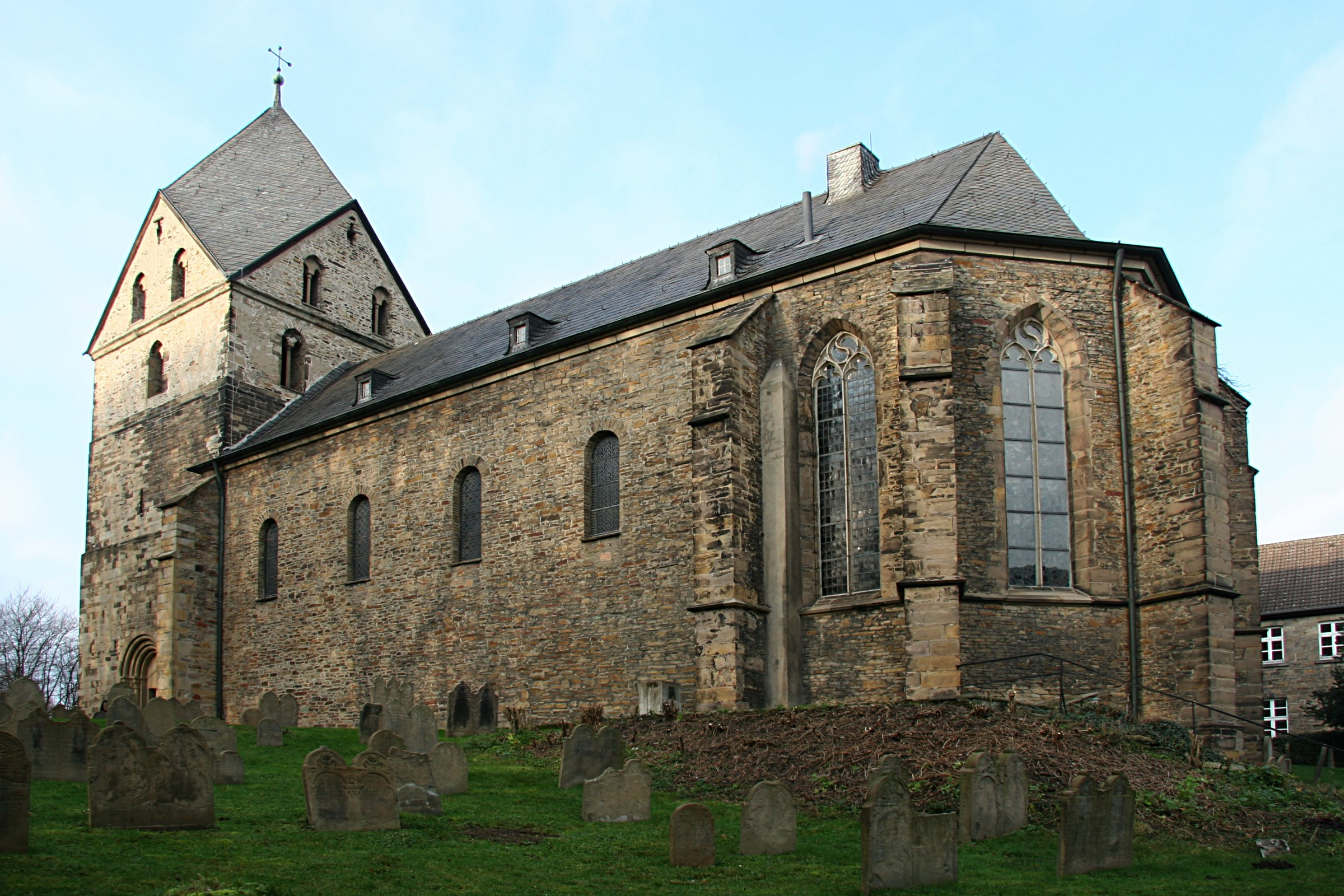
View from the north east

St. Peter (also St. Peter zu Syburg) is a Romanesque church in Syburg, now a suburb of Dortmund, Germany. It is the active Protestant parish church of Syburg, officially named "Ev. Kirche St. Peter zu Dortmund-Syburg". It serves as a concert venue for the bimonthly Syburger Sonntagsmusiken (Syburg Sunday Music).

== Location and significance ==
Standing on a rocky outcrop above the confluence of the Ruhr and the Lenne, the sandstone church is one of the most noticeable landmarks in the area. It is listed as a monument by the Denkmalbehörde der Stadt Dortmund.

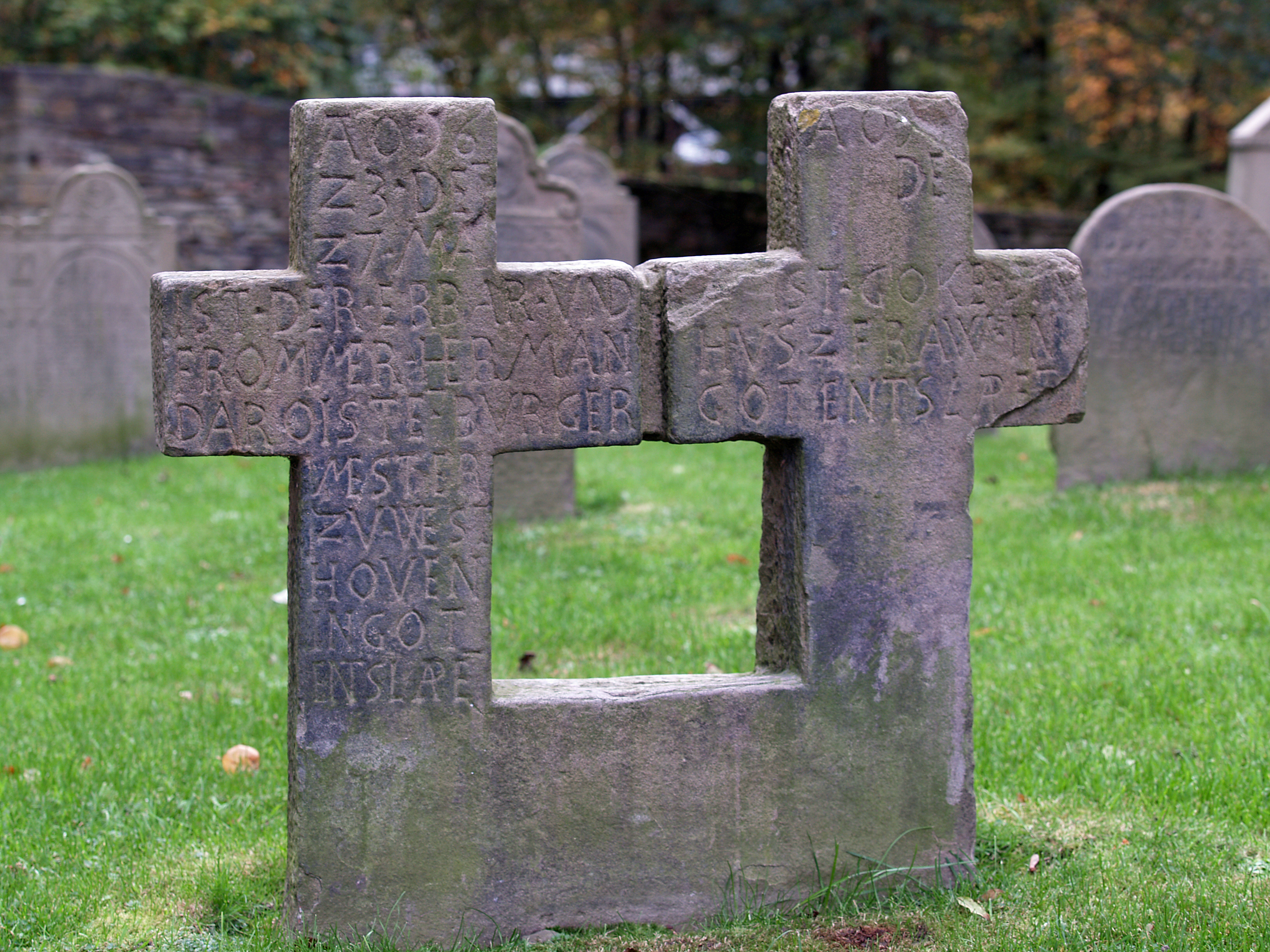
Ancient gravestones in the churchyard

The church is surrounded by a graveyard, which contains the oldest gravestones in Westphalia; three stones date back to between 750 and 850, one of which is in the church.

== History ==
In his desire for Christianization, Charlemagne conquered the strategic area in 775. The original church, described as a basilica, is documented in the Annals of Lorsch as early as 776, making it the oldest in Dortmund and probably in Westphalia. Remnants of the simple rectangular wooden building are now under examination. The neighbouring castle of Hohensyburg, taken the same year by the Saxons, was liberated by Pope Leo III in 799. In the presence of Charlemagne and other dignitaries, the Pope dedicated the church to St. Peter, the patron saint of the Carolingians. At the same time, Syburg was given pilgrimage rights associated with the feast of St. Mark on 25 April and was allowed to hold a two-week market associated with the feast. The pilgrims were attracted by the many relics in the church, including a silver skull of St. Barbara.

The present-day building dates from the 12th century. It was built around 1100 with a flat ceiling and was a Wehrkirche (Fortified church). The tower, still standing today, was built in the 13th century. The church was an important medieval pilgrimage site. The church was damaged by fire in 1673 during the Franco-Dutch War leading to the destruction of the Romanesque apse. Replacing the apse, the chancel was built in 1688 with pointed windows in the Gothic style.

In the spring of 1945, at the end of World War II, the church was badly damaged by a bomb which completely destroyed the nave. It was rebuilt, together with section of the chancel, from 1953 to 1954. During excavations in 1950–51, 1976–77 and 1983, foundations of a Romanesque apse and a square building from the time of Charlemagne were found.

== Furnishings and fittings ==
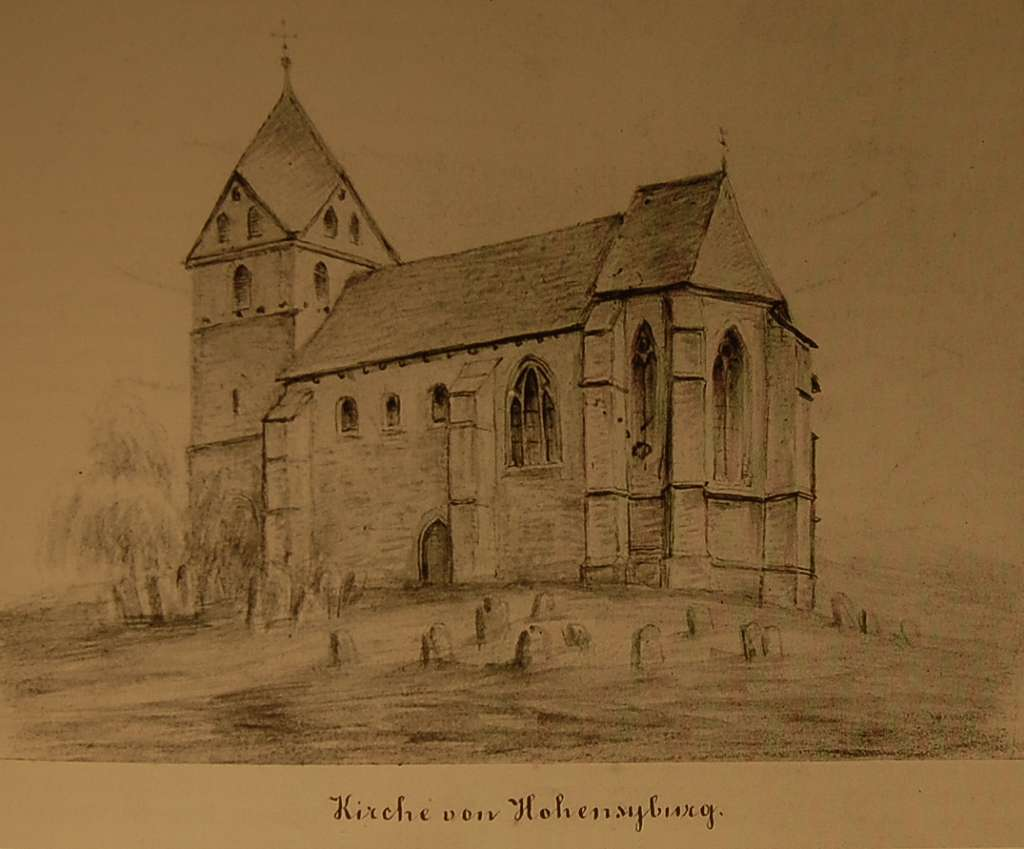
The fort-like look of the church in the mid-19th century (artist unknown)

After the Reformation, the Protestant pastor Luerman destroyed everything in the church associated with Catholicism. As a result, it is difficult to trace the building's history until 1580. The simple cross in white Carrara marble, the oldest artefact in the church, can therefore be dated to the end of the 16th century. The cross can now be seen on the first floor of the defensive tower.

In the 1950s, the church was furnished with stained glass windows by Walter Benner: a window depicting St. Barbara is in the tower while the three in the chancel show scenes from the life of St. Peter. The sculptor Bernhard Kleinhans (1926–2004) created the bronze figures of St. Peter and his wife whose existence is based on the story of Christ's healing of Peter's mother-in-law in Matthew, Chapter 18. The bronze cross on the altar with its enamel decoration is the work of Egino Weinert from Cologne.

The church is the setting for a novel by Gertrud von Le Fort, Spökenkieken. Eine Liebesgeschichte rund um die Kirche St. Peter zu Syburg und Haus Villigst.

== Music ==
A new organ was built in 1998 by the firm Claus Sebastian (Geesthacht). Since then, the church has served as a concert venue for the bi-monthly Syburger Sonntagsmusiken (Syburg Sunday Music) of organ music, chamber music and vocal music. On an initiative of Willi Gundlach, conductor of the Kammerchor der Universität Dortmund (chamber choir of the University of Dortmund), guest artists have included Martin Blindow, who played the first concert at the new organ on 10 May 1998, the Alsfelder Vokalensemble, conducted by Wolfgang Helbich, organist Heinz Wunderlich, and the VokalEnsemble Köln, conducted by Max Ciolek. The 100th concert was given in 2012. The regular event in December is called Offenes Kantatensingen (Open cantata singing) and featured in 2012 Bach's cantata Darzu ist erschienen der Sohn Gottes, BWV 40. In 2016, Georg Poplutz performed Schubert's Die schöne Müllerin, accompanied by a guitar duo.

== Literature ==
- Kirchengemeinde Syburg auf dem Höchsten (Hg.), Ein Leben für Syburg, Festschrift zum 80. Geburtstag des Ortshistorikers Willi Kuhlmann, Hardcover, 156 pages, 28 illustrations. ISBN 978-3-929931-13-6 (in German)
- Gertrud von Le Fort: Spökenkieken. Eine Liebesgeschichte rund um die Kirche St. Peter zu Syburg und Haus Villigst. Commentary and illustrations by Renate Breimann. Ingrid Lessing Verlag, 2010, ISBN 978-3-929931-28-0. (in German)
- Renate Breimann: Ev. Kirche St. Peter zu Syburg, Kirchenführer. Ingrid Lessing Verlag, 2007, 39 pages. ISBN 978-3-929931-24-2. (in German)
- Rüdiger Jordan: Von Kapitellen, Kanzeln und Taufsteinen. Ein spannender Führer zu 67 Kirchen und Klöstern im Ruhrtal. Klartext Verlag, 2006, ISBN 3-89861-436-0. (in German)
