= Willi Gundlach =

German choral conductor and academic (1929–2025)

- c. 2010
- Born: 15 May 1929; Oberhausen, Rhine Province, Prussia, Germany
- Died: 6 November 2025 (aged 96)
- Education: PH Braunschweig; Musikhochschule Hannover; Technical University of Hannover; Musikhochschule Kiel; Musikhochschule Köln
- Occupations: Choral conductor; Music editor; Academic teacher
- Organizations: Technical University of Dortmund; Syburger Sonntagskonzerte

Willi Gundlach (15 May 1929 – 6 November 2025) was a German choral conductor and musicologist. He taught music pedagogy at the music department of the Technical University of Dortmund. He researched and edited works by Fanny Hensel. He founded and conducted a chamber choir at the university, the Dortmund University Chamber Choir, and recorded with them, including operas for the Kurt Weill Foundation. After his retirement from teaching, he continued to conduct the chamber choir, and he cofounded and organised a concert series at St. Peter, Syburg, including organ concerts and vocal concerts with notable performers.

== Life and career ==
Born in Oberhausen on 15 May 1929, Gundlach studied first to be an elementary teacher at the Pädagogische Hochschule (PH, School of education) in Braunschweig. He studied to be a teacher of higher education in Hanover, at both the Musikhochschule and the Technical University. He studied musicology in Kiel and at University of Cologne for his doctorate.

=== Teaching ===
Gundlach first began teaching at the PH Flensburg in 1960, then from 1963 at the PH Dortmund. He conducted a choir at the PH Dortmund from 1976, and founded an additional chamber choir there in 1979. In 1980, when the PH was integrated into the Technical University of Dortmund, he was appointed professor of music and its pedagogy ("Musik und ihre Didaktik"). He published several books on his topics, including studies of Fanny Hensel. His editions of her choral works were published by Schott. In 1985, he founded an international week of music, Campus cantat (The campus sings). He retired from teaching in 1994, but conducted the choir of the university until 1995 and ran the Campus cantat project to 2001.

=== Kammerchor ===
Gundlach founded a chamber choir in 1979, still at the PH, which became the chamber choir of the university, named Kammerchor der Universität Dortmund (Dortmund University Chamber Choir). They recorded choral music, including works by Hugo Distler und Fanny Hensel. He conducted a recording of Distler's Choralpassion, Op. 7, for soloists and five-part choir a cappella, with Peter Kooy as vox Christi, Wilfried Jochens as the Evangelist, and Gerrit Miehlke as Pilate. He recorded in 1990 two operas by Kurt Weill for the Kurt Weill Foundation, with soloists, the Kammerchor and orchestra, Der Jasager, written in 1930, and Down in the Valley, written in 1948. He conducted the Kammerchor until 2005.

=== Syburg ===
He initiated and cofounded a concert series of bimonthly concerts at the Romanesque church St. Peter in Syburg, the Syburger Sonntagsmusiken. The series began in 1998 with the inauguration of a new organ. Performers have included Heinz Wunderlich, a pupil of Karl Straube and a professor in Hamburg, the composer and organist Wolfgang Stockmeier, professor of organ and improvisation at the Musikhochschule Köln, and Hatto Ständer who taught organ at the Dortmund University. Among the vocal groups were, besides the Kammerchor, the Alsfelder Vokalensemble, conducted by Wolfgang Helbich, and the Kettwiger Bach-Ensemble, conducted by Wolfgang Kläsener. The 100th concert was given in 2012.

Gundlach organised an Offenes Kantatensingen (Open cantata singing) as part of the concert series, regularly on the Second Sunday in Advent, calling volunteer singers to an all-day rehearsal the day before, and a rehearsal with soloists and orchestra, mostly students of the university. He moderated the event in the candle-lit church, conducting all who gathered in singing Advent songs and rounds, and conducting the cantata with the prepared project group. After a start in 1998 with varied choral music for Christmas, the programming was more and more ambitious. In 1999, Dieterich Buxtehude's Magnificat was performed, among others. In 2000 the first Bach cantata was tried, Nun komm, der Heiden Heiland, BWV 61, followed in 2001 by Herz und Mund und Tat und Leben, BWV 147, and in 2002 by Wachet auf, ruft uns die Stimme, BWV 140. In 2003, the ensemble performed a Magnificat in G major by Georg Philipp Telemann, while in 2004, the prepared cantata was Part VI from Bach's Christmas Oratorio, Fallt mit Danken. In 2005, Gundlach conducted the Oratorio de Noël by Camille Saint-Saëns. The choice of 2006 was Part I from Handel's Messiah, covering Advent and Christmas. In 2007 Gundlach selected Part III from the Christmas Oratorio, beginning Herrscher des Himmels, erhöre das Lallen, and in 2008 when the series celebrated its 10th anniversary, Part I, beginning Jauchzet, frohlocket!. Gundlach then passed the cantata series to younger musicians, but conducted one more Bach cantata in the 100th concert on 6 May 2012, the congratulatory cantata BWV 207, however with a new text written for the occasion by Martin Geck.

Gundlach died on 6 November 2025, at the age of 96.
