= Wie liegt die Stadt so wüst =

1945 motet by Rudolf Mauersberger

- Motet by Rudolf Mauersberger
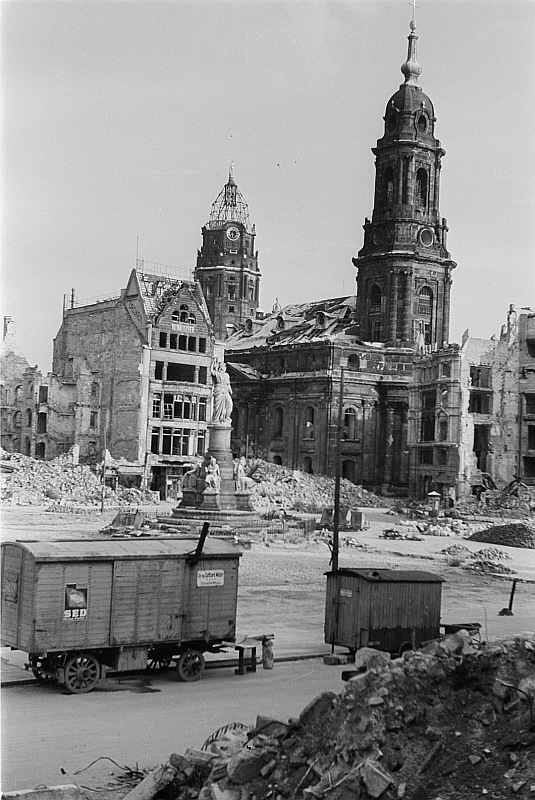
- Kreuzkirche, Dresden in 1946
- Key: F minor
- Catalogue: RMWV 4/1
- Text: excerpts from the Book of Lamentations
- Language: German
- Composed: 31 March 1945
- Performed: 4 August 1945
- Scoring: SATB a cappella

Wie liegt die Stadt so wüst (How doth the city sit solitary, lit.: How desolate lies the city, How Deserted Lies the City), RMWV 4/1, is a motet for choir, a cappella by Rudolf Mauersberger, composed in 1945 based on texts in German compiled by him from the Book of Lamentations. It is subtitled Trauermotette nach den Klageliedern Jeremiae, as a mourning motet after Jeremiah's Lamentations. He wrote it after the bombing of Dresden in World War II for a mixed choir of four to seven parts. It was first performed on 4 August 1945 by the Dresdner Kreuzchor in its first vespers after the war in the destroyed Kreuzkirche.

== History ==
Mauersberger was Kreuzkantor in Dresden from 1930 until his death in 1971, who not only conducted the Dresdner Kreuzchor but also composed for the group. After the bombing of Dresden, he escaped to his hometown Mauersberg. Eleven of the boys in the Kreuzchor, of the 33 who had remained, were killed in the bombing.

Mauersberger read on Good Friday in the Book of Lamentions (Klagelieder Jeremiae), and realised similarities to the actual situation. He chose expressive sentences in Luther's translation from the five chapters of the Book. The autograph manuscript of his motet dates to the following day, 31 March. He conducted the first performance on 4 August 1945, sung by the Kreuzchor in its first vespers service after the war in the destroyed Kreuzkirche. The motet was published by Merseburger Verlag, titled Wie liegt die Stadt so wüst. Trauermotette nach den Klageliedern Jeremiae für 4-7st. gemischten Chor.

== Text ==
The text of the motets is compiled from twelve excerpts taken from the Book of Lamentations in the translation by Martin Luther, ignoring its author's sequence. Mauersberger's intention was not to set Lamentations to music, but to use them as a means to express the actual suffering in Dresden.

In the following table, the first column is chapter and verse from the Lamentions, the second the German text, the third the English text in the King James Version, which is not always a translation of the German.

Divisions of the motet
Verse	German (Luther)	English (KJV)
1:1	Wie liegt die Stadt so wüst, die voll Volks war.	How doth the city sit solitary, that was full of people!
1:4	Alle ihre Tore stehen öde.	All her gates are desolate.
4:1	Wie liegen die Steine des Heiligtums vorn auf allen Gassen zerstreut	The stones of the sanctuary are poured out in the top of every street.
1:13	Er hat ein Feuer aus der Höhe in meine Gebeine gesandt und es lassen walten.	From above hath he sent fire into my bones, and it prevaileth against them.
2:15	Ist das die Stadt, von der man sagt, sie sei die Allerschönste, der sich das ganze Land freuet.	Is this the city that men call The perfection of beauty, The joy of the whole earth?
1:9	Sie hätte nicht gedacht, daß es ihr zuletzt so gehen würde;	She remembereth not her last end;
1:9	sie ist ja zu greulich heruntergestoßen und hat dazu niemand, der sie tröstet.	therefore she came down wonderfully: she had no comforter.
5:17	Darum ist unser Herz betrübt und unsere Augen sind finster geworden:	For this our heart is faint; for these things our eyes are dim.
5:20	Warum willst du unser so gar vergessen und uns lebenslang so gar verlassen!	Wherefore dost thou forget us for ever, and forsake us so long time?
5:21	Bringe uns, Herr, wieder zu dir, daß wir wieder heimkommen!	Turn thou us unto thee, O Lord, and we shall be turned.
5:21	Erneue unsre Tage wie vor alters.	Renew our days as of old.
1:9	Ach Herr, siehe an mein Elend!	O Lord, behold my affliction.

In Lamentations 1, 2 and 4, the destruction of Jerusalem is lamented, while chapters 3 and 5 express a confession of guilt and a prayer for turning the misery. In his selection, Mauersberger omitted the confession. His way to arrange the texts is understandable due to his state of mind after the bombing of Dresden.

== Music ==
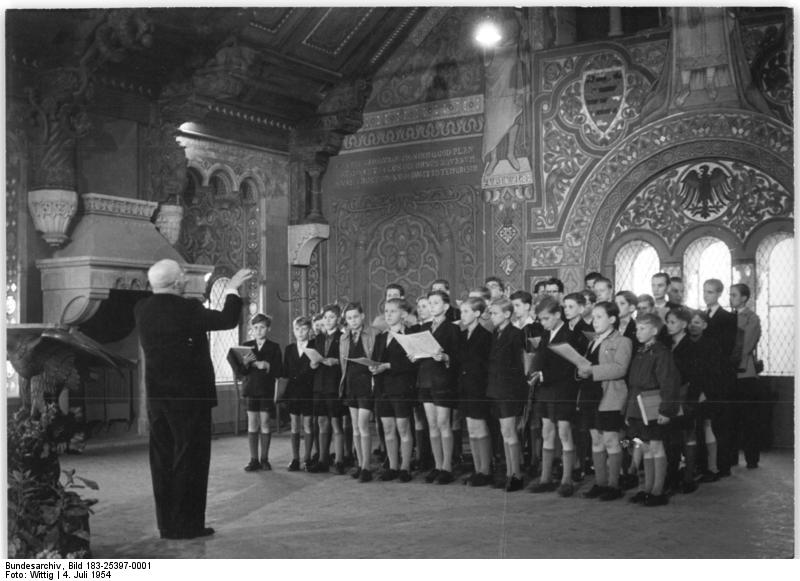
Mauersberger conducting the Dresdner Kreuzchor, Wartburg 1954

The composition is F minor and 3/4 time, marked Langsam (Slowly). The motet is structured in twelve divisions. The music follows the text word for word. It uses dissonances, and both tonal setting and sequences of chords without tonal relation. The text is often held syllabic, with occasional melismas to stress certain words such as "öde". The word "Heiligtum" (sanctuary) is in seven parts, using the symbolism of the number 7. The word "Höhe" (height) has the highest note in the composition. The lost beauty of the city is illustrated in soft mysterious sounds. The "heruntergestoßen" downward movement is portrayed in excited lines going down over more than an octave, while the following state of no consolation is expressed by empty fifths, low bass, and the only chromatic line in the composition.

In the second section, "Warum willst du unser so gar vergessen", the question "Warum" (Why?) is repeated often, with increasing intensity (crescendo). The prayer "Bringe uns, Herr, wieder zu dir" for a return to God is sung by the high voices only, divided in four parts; the melody is reminiscent of a song or chorale. In the section "Erneue unsre Tage wie vor alters", the remembrance of rich earlier times is illustrated by the longest melisma in the motet, over six bars.

The last section is the setting of one sentence, "Ach Herr, siehe an mein Elend!", now rendering the word "Elend" (misery) in seven parts of high intensity. The reflection of misery is expressed in parallels of fourths and fifths, softer and softer in downward movement.

== Critical reception ==
In 2017 the musicologist Wolfgang Mende lectured at the Sächsische Landesbibliothek – Staats- und Universitätsbibliothek Dresden about views of history in the musical memory of the bombing of Dresden ("Geschichtsbilder in der musikalischen Gedenkkultur zum 13. Februar"). He saw a problem in the repetition of the question "Warum?" (Why?), since, in his view, the political and military situation in Dresden that caused the bombing was obvious. Mende missed the questions of guilt and repentance that are central to Lamentations, but were omitted in Mauersberger's choice of text.

== Recordings ==
Recordings of Wie liegt die Stadt so wüst were made by the Dresdner Kreuzchor and other boys' choirs, but also by chamber choirs and vocal ensembles. The Kreuzchor recorded Wie liegt die Stadt so wüst in 1995, conducted by Matthias Jung, followed by the low bells of the Kreuzkirche, and then the Dresdner Requiem.

In 2013, the motet was recorded to conclude a collection The Lost City - Lamentations Through the Ages, of settings of texts from Lamentations through the centuries, performed by the Sospiri vocal ensemble founded by the composer John Duggan and the tenor Christopher Watson. A reviewer noted: "The music to which he set these words is homophonic and, despite the fact that much of the piece is quiet, it’s highly charged. Indeed, the effect is all the more powerful precisely because there is no raging in it; instead Mauersberger has composed a sorrowful, profoundly felt lament for his city."
