= Max Ciolek =

German tenor, conductor and photographer

- Occupation: Classical tenor
- Organizations: VokalEnsemble Köln | ensemble vocaliter

Max Ciolek is a German tenor, conductor and composer. He is the founder of VokalEnsemble Köln. As a singer, he is noted for his recordings of Bach works, particularly the Evangelist in his Passions, but he has recorded music from all periods of classical music and has appeared internationally.

== Career ==
Born in Dortmund, Ciolek first studied church music. He was "discovered" as a soloist when he sang in a choir for Bach's Mass in B minor, and stepped in as the tenor soloist for a singer who was ill. He received voice training as a member of The King’s Singers, working with Alastair Thompson. He studied voice formally at the Akademie für Alte Musik Bremen with John Potter and at the Musikhochschule Köln with Mechthild Georg. He took master classes with Emma Kirkby and Christoph Prégardien. His repertory ranges from Gregorian chant to contemporary and avant-garde.

Ciolek is noted for interpreting the Evangelist in Bach's Passions and oratorio. In 1999, he performed the part in a recorded concert of Bach's St Matthew Passion as part of the festival Musikwochen Weserbergland, with choirs and orchestra of the Marktkirche, Hameln, alongside Hans-Christian Hinz as the vox Christi, Veronika Winter, Gabriele Binder and Gotthold Schwarz, conducted by Hans Christoph Becker-Foss. In 2002 he was the Evangelist in a recording of Bach's Christmas Oratorio at St. Michael, Aachen, with Wolfgang Karius conducting the Aachener Bachverein and the Hamburger Barockorchester on period instruments, alongside Sabine Schneider, Christine Wehler and Raimund Fischer. In 2003 he was the Evangelist in a recorded performance of Bach's St John Passion as part of the Bach-Tage Wuppertral, with Wolfgang Kläsener conducting the Kantorei Barmen-Gemarke and the orchestra of the Immanuelskirche.

In 2000 Ciolek performed Bach's Mass in B minor with La Petite Bande conducted by Sigiswald Kuijken, a production which went on tours to Australia and South America. The soloists, Elisabeth Hermans, Midori Suzuki, Patrizia Hardt, Petra Noskaiová, Knut Schoch, Jan van der Crabben and Stephan MacLeod, also formed the choir (OVPP).

Ciolek is the founder of the chamber choirs VokalEnsemble Köln and ensemble vocaliter.
