= Aachener Bachverein =

Aachener Bachverein (often abbreviated as ABV) is a German oratorio choir of the Evangelical Church in the Rhineland in the city of Aachen that was founded in 1913 by Heinrich Boell. Although the chorus sings a varied repertoire that encompasses music from all historical periods to new compositions, the ensemble is particularly known for their historically informed performances of baroque and classical period music that are often made in conjunction with internationally renowned instrumental ensembles and orchestras. The choir frequently tours, has had several of their performances broadcast on German radio, and has recorded a number of cantatas by J.S. Bach.

== List of directors ==
- Heinrich Boell (1913–1924)
- Rudolf Mauersberger (1924–1925)
- Erhard Mauersberger (1925–1928)
- Hans Klotz (1928-1942)
- Hans Hulverscheidt (1956–1974)
- Johannes Geffert (1974–1979)
- Heribert Breuer (1979–1983)
- Wolfgang Karius (1983–2008)
- Georg Hage (2008–present)
