= Hans Klotz =

Hans Klotz (October 25, 1900 – May 11, 1987) was a German organist and musicologist.

== Life and career ==
Hans Klotz was born on October 25, 1900 in Offenbach am Main. He graduated from the Hoch Conservatory in 1922 with a diploma in piano. He later earned a doctorate from that same school in musicology in 1927 where he trained in that subject under Moritz Bauer. He then entered the Leipzig Conservatory where he trained as an organist under Karl Straube and continued piano studies with Anna Teichmüller. He also studied music theory there with Hermann Grabner. In 1933 he went to Paris to train further on the organ with Charles-Marie Widor.

Hans Klotz was organist at the Evangelical Church in the Rhineland and director of the Aachener Bachverein from 1928 through 1942. He then served as director of church music at St. Nikolas' Church, Flensburg from 1946 through 1952. He was a professor of the organ at first the Lübeck Academy of Music (1950-1953) and then the Hochschule für Musik und Tanz Köln (1954-1966). He published several academic works on organ music and performance practice, both historical and contemporary.

Hans Klotz died in Cologne on May 11, 1987.
