= Adele Stolte =

German soprano (1932–2020)

- Born: 12 October 1932; Sperenberg, Germany
- Occupations: Classical soprano; Academic voice teacher
- Organization: Thomanerchor

Adele Stolte (12 October 1932 – 26 September 2020) was a German soprano singer in concert and Lieder, and an academic voice teacher.

== Biography ==
Born in Sperenberg, Stolte attended schools in Lübeck and Potsdam. She studied voice with Anneliese Buschmann in Rostock. With the Thomanerchor she started broadcasting in 1958 and recording of Bach cantatas in 1960. In 1958 she sang in the premiere of Te Deum by Ernst Pepping in Dresden. She recorded the oratorio Das Gesicht Jesajas (The Vision of Isaiah) op. 41 of Willy Burkhard, with Kurt Huber, Jakob Stämpfli and the Bern Symphony Orchestra conducted by Martin Flämig. In the recording of Bach's St Matthew Passion conducted by Erhard Mauersberger and Rudolf Mauersberger in 1962 she was the soprano soloist with Peter Schreier as the Evangelist, Theo Adam as the Vox Christi (voice of Jesus), Annelies Burmeister, Hans-Joachim Rotzsch and Günther Leib. She recorded Bach cantatas with Peter Schreier, Theo Adam, the Thomanerchor and the Leipzig Gewandhaus Orchestra conducted by Erhard Mauersberger, such as the cantata for Pentecost Erschallet, ihr Lieder, erklinget, ihr Saiten! BWV 172 in 1970.

In 1964, together with Gerda Schriever, Hans-Joachim Rotzsch and Hermann Christian Polster she founded the quartet Leipziger Bachsolisten. In 1966 she became a member of the Direktorium of the Neue Bachgesellschaft, Leipzig. She started teaching in 1969, including classes in Poland and voice coaching for choirs. She taught at the Berlin University of the Arts from 1990 to 2005 and was appointed Honorary Professor in 1995. She was a teacher of Bogna Bartosz.

Adele Stolte was awarded prizes such as, in 1962, the Edison Award, in 1966 the East German Art Prize (Kunstpreis der Deutsche Demokratischen Republik) and in 2007 the Order of Merit of the Federal Republic of Germany.
