= Erhard Mauersberger =

German choral conductor

- Born: 29 December 1903; Mauersberg, Saxony, German Empire
- Died: 11 December 1982 (aged 78); Leipzig, East Germany
- Education: Leipziger Konservatorium
- Occupations: Choral conductor; Thomaskantor; Composer; Academic teacher
- Organizations: Aachener Bachverein; University of Music Franz Liszt Weimar; Thomanerchor

Erhard Mauersberger (29 December 1903 in Mauersberg, Saxony – 11 December 1982 in Leipzig) was a German choral conductor who conducted the Thomanerchor as the 14th Thomaskantor since Johann Sebastian Bach. He was also an academic teacher and composer.

== Biography ==
Mauersberger, the son of a cantor in Mauersberg, Saxony, was the younger brother of Rudolf Mauersberger, who was cantor of the Dresdner Kreuzchor. He was a Thomaner (a member of the Thomanerchor) from 1914 to 1920 under Gustav Schreck. He studied the organ with Karl Straube at the Leipziger Konservatorium.

In 1925 he became director of the Aachener Bachverein, and in 1928 became a teacher at the Mainz Conservatory and a cantor at the Christuskirche in Mainz. From 1930 he was cantor at the Georgenkirche in Eisenach. In 1932 he started teaching at the Hochschule für Musik "Franz Liszt", Weimar, and was appointed professor for choral conducting in 1946. In autumn 1933 he joined the German Christians. From 1939 on, he worked in their Institute for the Study and Elimination of Jewish Influence on German Church Life and was the musical editor of their "de-Judaized" hymnal, Grosser Gott, wir loben Dich. Beginning in 1950, he directed the Thüringer Kirchenmusikhochschule in Eisenach.

From 1961 to 1972 he was Thomaskantor, succeeding Kurt Thomas. With his brother, he conducted Bach's St Matthew Passion in a recording with Peter Schreier as the Evangelist, Theo Adam as the Vox Christi (voice of Jesus), Adele Stolte, Annelies Burmeister, Hans-Joachim Rotzsch and Günther Leib.

He composed works a cappella in late romantic style for the choir.

== Sources ==
- Eduard Crass: Die Thomaner. Kommentierter Bildbericht über ihre 750jährige Geschichte 1212–1962. VEB Verlag Leipzig 1962.
- Mauersberger, Helga (2007). Dresdner Kreuzchor und Thomanerchor Leipzig (in German). Marienberg: Druck- und Verl.-Gesellschaft. ISBN 978-3-931770-46-4.
- Waibel, Harry (2011). Diener vieler Herren : ehemalige NS-Funktionäre in der SBZ/DDR (in German). Frankfurt am Main: Peter Lang. p. 212. ISBN 978-3-653-01193-7. OCLC 815288500.
- Wörner, Corinna (2023). Zwischen Anpassung und Resistenz Der Thomanerchor Leipzig in zwei politischen Systemen (in German). Hildesheim: Georg Olms Verlag. ISBN 978-3-487-16232-4. OCLC 1374206639.
- Corinna Wörner:Zwischen Kulturpflege und Kulturpropaganda – Thomaner- und Kreuzchor als Kulturbotschafter der DDR, in: Ritter, Rüdiger (Hg.): Musik und ihre gesellschaftliche Bedeutung in den staats- und postsozialistischen Ländern Mittel- und Osteuropas seit 1945, (Ostmitteleuropa interdisziplinär, Bd. 3), Wiesbaden 2023, p. 217–235, ISBN 978-3-447-12113-2.
