= Mechthild Georg =

German opera singer

- Born: Germany
- Education: Cologne University; Robert Schumann Hochschule
- Occupations: Operatic mezzo-soprano; Academic teacher
- Organizations: Musikhochschule Köln
- Website: www.mechthild-georg.de

Mechthild Georg is a German operatic mezzo-soprano, and a professor of voice at the Musikhochschule Köln.

== Career ==
Georg studied Roman studies and history at the Cologne University, and music pedagogy at the Musikhochschule Köln. She then studied voice at the Robert Schumann Hochschule in Düsseldorf with Ingeborg Reichelt. She graduated in 1982 as a concert singer, and continued studies as an opera singer. She was a member of the Cologne Opera Studio in 1982/83, and took master classes with Giulietta Simionato and Elisabeth Schwarzkopf.

She performed roles of early Italian opera such as Penelope in Monteverdi's Il ritorno d'Ulisse in patria and Ottavia in his L'incoronazione di Poppea. She appeared as Cherubino in Le nozze di Figaro, and also in contemporary opera, such as Graf Mirabeau by Siegfried Matthus.

She participated in recordings of rarely recorded operas, performing roles such as Tyrsis in Telemann's Der neumodische Liebhaber Damon, conducted by Michael Schneider in 1996, Schubert's Die Verschworenen the same year, conducted by Christoph Spering, and Gundelind in the first recording of Siegfried Wagner's Die heilige Linde in 2001, conducted by Werner Andreas Albert.

As a concert singer, Georg has performed at international festivals, and made several recordings. On 23 June 1988 she performed two works by C. P. E. Bach, his Magnificat and the oratorio Die Israeliten in der Wüste, alongside Nancy Argenta, Lena Lootens, Howard Crook and Stephen Roberts, conducted by Frieder Bernius, in the first concert of the Rheingau Musik Festival in Eberbach Abbey. She recorded works by Bach with Helmuth Rilling, including his cantata Man singet mit Freuden vom Sieg, BWV 149, and his Ascension Oratorio.

She has taught at the Musikhochschule Köln from 1989, and was appointed professor of voice in 1998. Among her students are Max Ciolek and her daughter Uta Christina Georg, who also became a mezzo-soprano.
