= Lena Lootens =

Belgian soprano

Lena Lootens (born April 14, 1959, Ghent) is a Belgian soprano.

== Life and career ==
Lena Lootens was born in Ghent, Belgium on April 14, 1959. She trained as a classical soprano with Vera Rosza in London and later with Margaret Honig and Cristina Deutekom in Amsterdam. She began her career as a concert soprano; appearing on stages in The Netherlands, Belgium, Poland, and England; and her career has predominantly been focused on the oratorio repertoire and other classical sacred music. She has also appeared in operas with the Vlaamse Opera in both Ghent and Antwerp.

Lootens has performed in Claudio Monteverdi's L'Incoronazione di Poppea, and with the Concerto Vocale, amongst many others. On 23 June 1988 she performed two works by C. P. E. Bach, his Magnificat and the oratorio Die Israeliten in der Wüste, with soloists Nancy Argenta, Mechthild Georg, Howard Crook and Stephen Roberts under Frieder Bernius in the first concert of the Rheingau Musik Festival in Eberbach Abbey.
