= Peter Schreier =

German tenor and conductor (1935–2019)

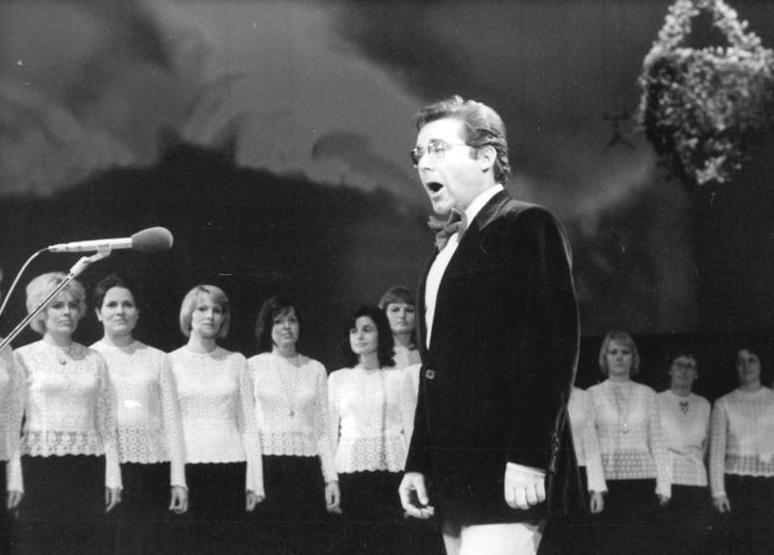
- Peter Schreier at the opening of the Palast der Republik in Berlin in 1976
- Born: 29 July 1935; Meissen, Germany
- Died: 25 December 2019 (aged 84); Dresden, Saxony, Germany
- Education: Dresdner Kreuzchor; Musikhochschule Dresden
- Occupations: Operatic tenor; Conductor
- Organizations: Staatsoper Dresden; Berlin State Opera
- Title: Kammersänger
- Awards: Ernst von Siemens Music Prize; Léonie Sonning Music Prize.

Peter Schreier (29 July 1935 – 25 December 2019) was a German tenor in opera, concert and lied, and a conductor. He was regarded as one of the leading lyric tenors of the 20th century.

Schreier was a member of the Dresdner Kreuzchor conducted by Rudolf Mauersberger, performing as an alto soloist. He became a tenor, focused on concert and lieder singing, well known internationally for the Evangelist parts in Bach's Christmas Oratorio and Passion. A member of the Berlin State Opera from 1963, he appeared in Mozart roles such as Belmonte in Die Entführung aus dem Serail and Tamino in Die Zauberflöte, and in the title role of Pfitzner's Palestrina, among others. He appeared at the Vienna State Opera and the Metropolitan Opera, among others, as one of few singers from the German Democratic Republic to perform internationally.

Schreier made many recordings, especially of Bach's works as both a singer and a conductor, even simultaneously. He recorded many lieder including the song cycles by Schubert and Schumann. He was known for intelligent understanding of texts and their musical expression with intensity. Schreier received awards including the Ernst von Siemens Music Prize, Léonie Sonning Music Prize.

== Early life ==
Schreier was born in Meissen, Saxony, and grew up in the village of Gauernitz, near Meissen, where his father was a teacher, cantor and organist. In June 1945, when Schreier was almost ten years old, and just a few months after the destruction of Dresden, he entered the boarding school of the Dresdner Kreuzchor boys' choir. Its conductor Rudolf Mauersberger recognized his talent. He let him sing many solo alto parts and created compositions with his voice in mind. Solo recordings from the time (1948–1951) were reissued on compact disc.

Schreier was 16 years old when his voice broke, and he became a tenor, as he had passionately wished, because of the several Evangelists – all tenors – in J.S. Bach's Passions and in his Christmas Oratorio. After he had decided to become a professional singer he took voice lessons, privately from 1954 to 1956, then at the Musikhochschule Dresden, where he also studied conducting.

== Career ==
Peter Schreier made his professional debut at the Dresdner Staatsoper in 1957, as the First Prisoner in Beethoven's Fidelio. His breakthrough came in 1962 as Belmonte in Mozart's Die Entführung aus dem Serail, and he also appeared as Tamino in The Magic Flute. In 1963, he became a member of the Berlin State Opera. Starting in 1966, he was for many years an annual guest of the Vienna State Opera. That same year he made his debut at the Bayreuth Festival as the young seaman in Tristan und Isolde with Karl Böhm as conductor. For 25 years, beginning in 1967, he took part in the program of the annual Salzburg Festival. In 1969, he starred as The Witch in Engelbert Humperdinck's Hansel and Gretel, in a CD recording that featured the Staatskapelle Dresden. He performed more than 60 operatic roles. It was important to him to sing the title role of Palestrina, the opera by Hans Pfitzner, not only in Munich but also in East Berlin — a controversial issue at the time in East Germany.

Schreier was one of few singers from the German Democratic Republic to perform internationally, including at the Metropolitan Opera. He appeared regularly at the Vienna State Opera, where he sang 200 performances, beginning as Tamino in 1967, also as Belmonte, Don Ottavio in Mozart's Don Giovanni, the title role of Idomeneo, Flamand in Capriccio by Richard Strauss, Lenski in Tchaikovsky's Eugen Onegin, Count Almaviva in Rossini's Il barbiere di Siviglia and Loge in Wagner's Das Rheingold. His Wagner roles also included Mime in Siegfried.

He recorded Bach cantatas regularly with the Thomanerchor and the Gewandhaus Orchestra conducted by Erhard Mauersberger, with soloists including Adele Stolte, Annelies Burmeister and Theo Adam, such as the cantata for Pentecost Erschallet, ihr Lieder, erklinget, ihr Saiten! BWV 172, in 1970. He was the Evangelist in Bach's St Matthew Passion in recordings conducted by both Rudolf and Erhard Mauersberger, Karl Richter, Claudio Abbado and Herbert von Karajan. He recorded Bach's St John Passion and Christmas Oratorio with Helmuth Rilling.

In June 2000, Schreier left the opera stage. His last role at the Berlin State Opera was Tamino; he argued that he could no longer pretend to be a young prince. He ended his singing career on 22 December 2005, combining the functions of Evangelist and conductor in a performance of Bach's Christmas Oratorio in Prague. He kept singing lieder, a genre he had pursued throughout his career, including the song cycles by Schubert and Schumann.

From the early 1970s, Schreier was also a conductor with a special interest in the works of Mozart, Bach, and Haydn. He conducted orchestras such as the Vienna Philharmonic and the New York Philharmonic.

== Personal life ==
Schreier was married and lived in Dresden from 1945 until his death, in the district of Loschwitz. He died in Dresden on Christmas Day, 25 December 2019, after a long illness. He was survived by his wife, Renate, and two sons, Torsten and Ralf. The funeral service took place at the Kreuzkirche, Dresden on 8 January 2020.

== Evaluation ==
Schreier was an extremely intelligent singer, with sympathetic feeling for the text. Monika Grütters, Federal Government Commissioner for Culture and the Media, summarised after his death that he was one of the most impressive voices from Germany ("eine der eindrucksvollsten Stimmen unseres Landes"), who represented Germany in the opera houses of the world as a nation of culture ("für die Kulturnation Deutschland gestanden"), remembered as the Evangelist in Bach's Passions, and having written music history in a career of four decades.

== Honours and awards ==
- Kammersänger (title conferred to singers of outstanding merit) by the governments of the GDR, Austria and Bavaria, 1963, 1980, 1982
- National First Class Prize of the GDR, 1967
- Robert Schumann Prize of the City of Zwickau, 1969
- Handel Prize of the City of Halle, 1972
- National Prize of the GDR, 1972
- Gold Vaterländischer Verdienstorden, 1984^{[5]}
- Ernst von Siemens Music Prize, 1988
- Léonie Sonning Music Prize, Denmark, 1988
- Honorary membership of the Musikverein Wien (Vienna Society of Music), 1986
- Star of People's Friendship, 1989
- Member of the Royal Swedish Academy of Music, 1989
- Bundesverdienstkreuz I. Klasse (Order of Merit of the Federal Republic of Germany), 1993
- Member of the Academy of Arts, Berlin, 1993
- Wiener Flötenuhr, 1994
- Georg Philipp Telemann Prize of the city of Magdeburg, 1994
- German Bible Prize, for service in the great Passions and Interpretation of the work of J.S. Bach, 1998
- European Church Music Prize, 2000
- Honorary citizen of the city of Meissen for efforts in fundraising for the city's restoration
- Royal Academy of Music/Kohn Foundation Bach Prize, 2009
- Hugo Wolf Medal, Hugo Wolf Academy, Stuttgart, 2011
- Leipzig International Mendelssohn Prize, 2011
- Bach Medal, Bach Festival Leipzig, for interpretation of Bach, 2013
- Sächsischer Verdienstorden, 2016
- Kunstpreis der Landeshauptstadt Dresden, 2016

== Discography ==
The German National Library holds recordings by Schreier, including:

=== As singer ===
- 80th Anniversary Edition, Berlin Classics (Edel) 2015
- Johann Sebastian Bach:
  - Matthäus-Passion (Evangelist and arias), conducted by Karl Richter, Archiv Produktion (Universal Music) 1989
  - Johannes-Passion, conducted by Hans-Joachim Rotzsch, RCA Classic (Sony Music) 1998
  - Weihnachtsoratorium, conducted by Martin Flämig, Dresdner Philharmonie, Dresdner Kreuzchor, Lukaskirche 1974
- Ludwig van Beethoven: An die ferne Geliebte, with András Schiff, piano, Decca (Universal Music) 1996
- Hector Berlioz: Requiem, conducted by Charles Munch, Deutsche Grammophon (Universal Music) 2009
- Johannes Brahms: Die schöne Magelone, with András Schiff, Belvedere (Harmonia Mundi) 2015
- Wolfgang Amadeus Mozart:
  - Opera Arias, Polygram Records 1990
  - Die Zauberflöte (Tamino), conducted by Wolfgang Sawallisch, EMI (Warner Classics) 1987
  - Der Odem der Liebe. Peter Schreier als Mozart-Tenor, conducted by Otmar Suitner, Eterna 1973
- Prokofjew – Hindemith: Lieder, Berlin Classics (Edel) 2004
- Franz Schubert:
  - Die schöne Müllerin (with Konrad Ragossnig, guitar), Berlin Classics (Edel) 2004
  - Die Winterreise (setting for voice and string quartet), Profil (Naxos) 2015
  - Schubert Songs, with András Schiff, Wigmore Hall Live (CODAEX Deutschland) 2006
- Heinrich Schütz: Johannes-Passion SWV 481 / Psalmen Davids, conducted by Martin Flämig, Berlin classics (Edel) 1997
- Robert Schumann:
  - Dichterliebe, with Christoph Eschenbach, Teldec Classics International GmbH 1991
  - Dichterliebe / Liederkreis, with Norman Shetler, Berlin Classics (Edel) 2007
- Vom Knabenalt zum lyrischen Tenor, Berlin Classics (Edel) 1995
- Richard Wagner: Tristan und Isolde (Melot), conducted by Herbert von Karajan, His Master's Voice, 1988
- Hugo Wolf:
  - Goethe-Lieder, with Wolfgang Sawallisch, Ariola Eurodisc 1986
  - Mörike-Lieder, with Karl Engel, Orfeo (Naxos Deutschland) 1998

=== As conductor ===
- Johann Sebastian Bach:
  - Weihnachtsoratorium, (selections) Staatskapelle Dresden. MC, Eterna-Digital, 1985
  - Johannes-Passion, Staatskapelle Dresden, Newton Classics (Membran), 2011
  - Zwei Hochzeitskantaten, Weichet nur, betrübte Schatten, BWV 202 / O holder Tag, erwünschte Zeit, BWV 210), the Kammerorchester Berlin, Brilliant Classics (c. 2000)
  - Weltliche Kantaten, Was mit behagt, ist nur die muntre Jagd, BWV 208 / Ich bin in mir vergnügt, BWV 204, Brilliant Classics (c. 2000)
  - Matthäus-Passion, Rundfunkchor Leipzig, Staatskapelle Dresden, VEB Schallplatten, Berlin/GDR, 1984
  - Messe h-Moll, Rundfunkchor Leipzig, Staatskapelle Dresden, Philips Classics Production, 1992
- Wolfgang Amadeus Mozart:
  - Requiem, Margaret Price, Trudeliese Schmidt, Francisco Araiza, Theo Adam; Rundfunkchor Leipzig & Staatskapelle Dresden, Philips, 1983

== Documentary films ==
- Peter Schreier – Alles hat seine Zeit. 83 Min., directed and produced by Heide Blum. D 2006. OCLC 315720106

== Literature ==
- Gottfried Schmiedel: Peter Schreier für Sie porträtiert. VEB Deutscher Verlag für Musik Leipzig, Leipzig 1976 DNB-IDN 770150675
- Peter Schreier: Aus meiner Sicht. Gedanken und Erinnerungen, Ostberlin 1983, 207 pages. ISBN 978-3-552-03535-5
- Lewinski, Wolf-Eberhard von (1992). Peter Schreier: Interviews, Tatsachen, Meinungen. Munich, Mainz: Piper, Schott. ISBN 978-3-492-18280-5.
- Jürgen Helfricht: Peter Schreier – Melodien eines Lebens. Verlag der Kunst Dresden, Husum 2008, ISBN 978-3-86530-109-3
- Renate Rätz: Schreier, Peter. In: Wer war wer in der DDR? 5. Ausgabe. Vol. 2, Ch. Links, Berlin 2010, ISBN 978-3-86153-561-4.
- Manfred Meier, Peter Schreier: Im Rückspiegel : Erinnerungen und Ansichten, recorded by Manfred Meier, Wien: Steinbauer 2005, ISBN 978-3-902494-04-7.
