= Wolfgang Karius =

German musician

- Born: June 4, 1943 (age 83); Gummersbach, Nazi Germany
- Genres: Classical
- Occupation: Conductor
- Instruments: Organ; harpsichord
- Labels: Erato; SFPP; Schwann; Electrola
- Formerly of: Aachener Bachverein

Wolfgang Karius (born 4 June 1943) is a German conductor, organist and harpsichordist.

== Biography ==
Karius was born at Gummersbach. He attended the Hochschule für Musik Köln where he studied organ under Wolfgang Stockmeier and Michael Schneider and the harpsichord under Hugo Ruf. After completing his studies in Cologne, he went to receive further education in Paris through a scholarship provided by the Government of France. Most of these studies were in the area of French organ music with Marie-Claire Alain and Jean Langlais. He pursued further master-classes in Baroque performance practice with Luigi Tagliavini, Anton Heiller and Kenneth Gilbert, and master-classes in conducting with Kurt Thomas and Sergiu Celibidache. He made further graduate studies in musicology and Romanistik studies at the University of Cologne.

After working as a church musician for many years, Karius took the position as organist, cantor, and choral conductor at the Annakirche in Aachen in 1983. In doing so he became the conductor of the Annakirche's internationally renowned oratorio choir, Aachener Bachverein. He led the ensemble up until 2008 during which time he toured with the choir throughout Western and Eastern Europe, Canada, Israel, and Lebanon. He has also made several radio appearances and CD recordings both as an organist and with the Aachener Bachverein for Erato, SFPP, Schwann and Electrola.

== Sources ==
- Biography of Wolfgang Karius at bach-cantatas.com
