= Heinrich Boell =

Heinrich Boell (13 September 1890, Wissembourg – 10 October 1947, Bonn) was a German organist and choir conductor.
