= Großrückerswalde =

- Municipality
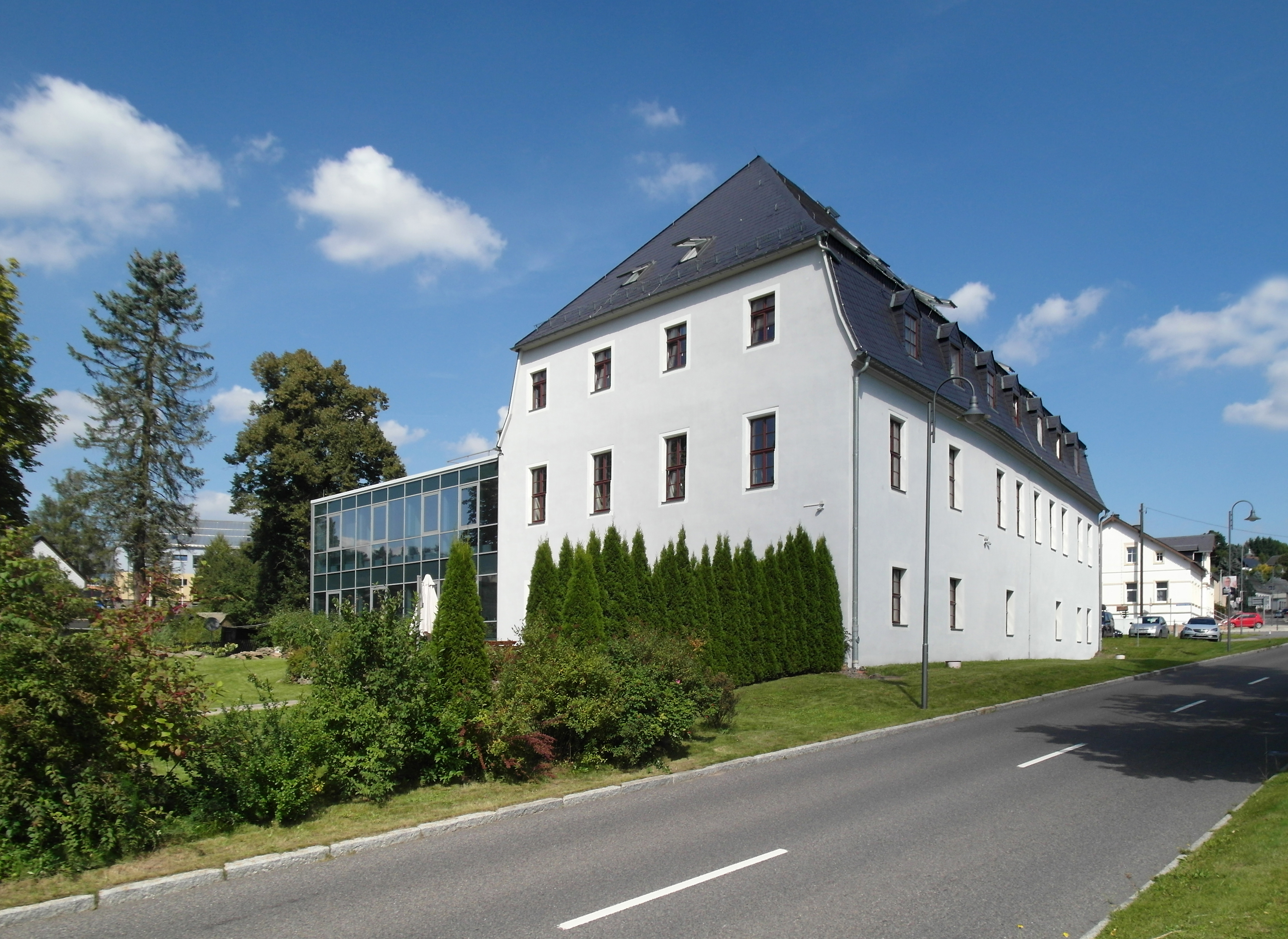
- House of Lords in Rückerswalde

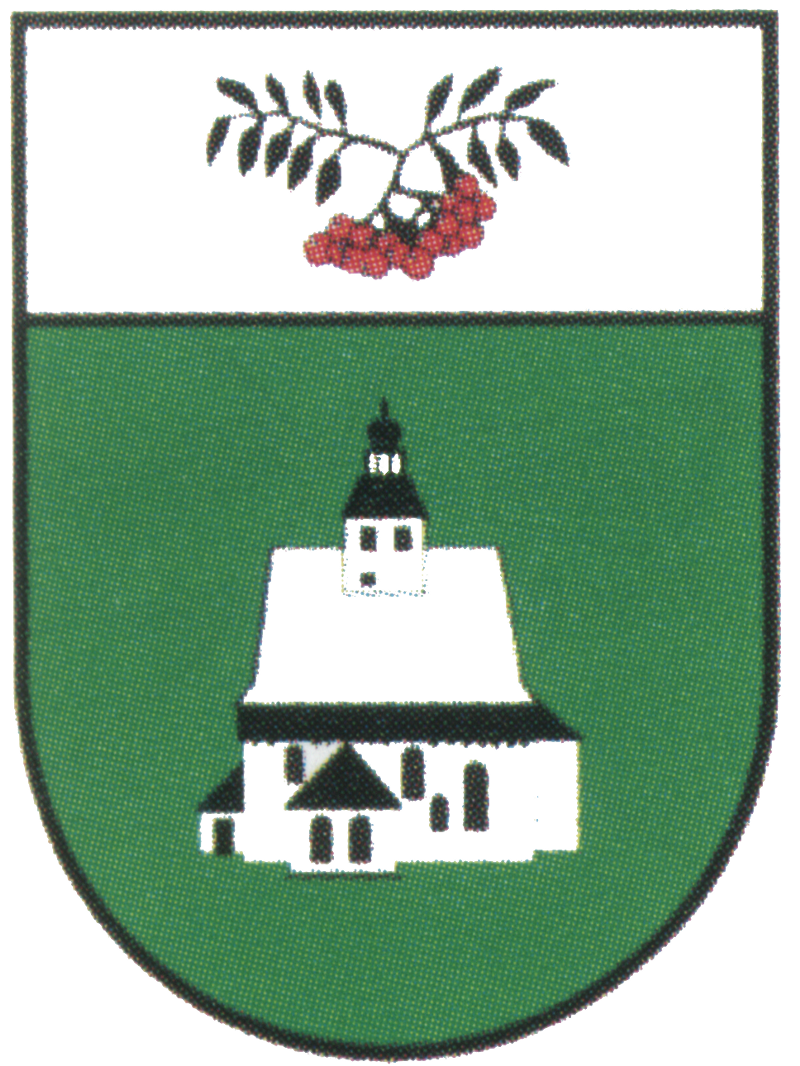
- Coat of arms

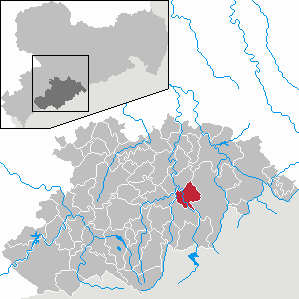
- Location of Großrückerswalde within Erzgebirgskreis district
- Interactive map of Großrückerswalde
- Location within Germany Location within Saxony
- Coordinates: 50°37′45″N 13°7′9″E
- Country: Germany
- State: Saxony
- District: Erzgebirgskreis
- Subdivisions: 6

Government
  - Mayor (2022–29): André Rösch

Area
  - Total: 26.69 km^{2} (10.31 sq mi)
- Elevation: 536 m (1,759 ft)

Population (2025-12-31)
  - Total: 3,121
  - Density: 116.9/km^{2} (302.9/sq mi)
- Time zone: UTC+01:00 (CET)
  - Summer (DST): UTC+02:00 (CEST)
- Postal codes: 09518
- Dialling codes: 03735
- Vehicle registration: ERZ, ANA, ASZ, AU, MAB, MEK, STL, SZB, ZP
- Website: www.grossrueckerswalde.de

Großrückerswalde is a municipality in the district Erzgebirgskreis, in Saxony, Germany.

It contains:

- Großrückerswalde with Boden (Großrückerswalde)
- Mauersberg
- Niederschmiedeberg
- Schindelbach
- Streckewalde
- Wolfsberg
