= Mauersberg =

- District of Großrückerswalde
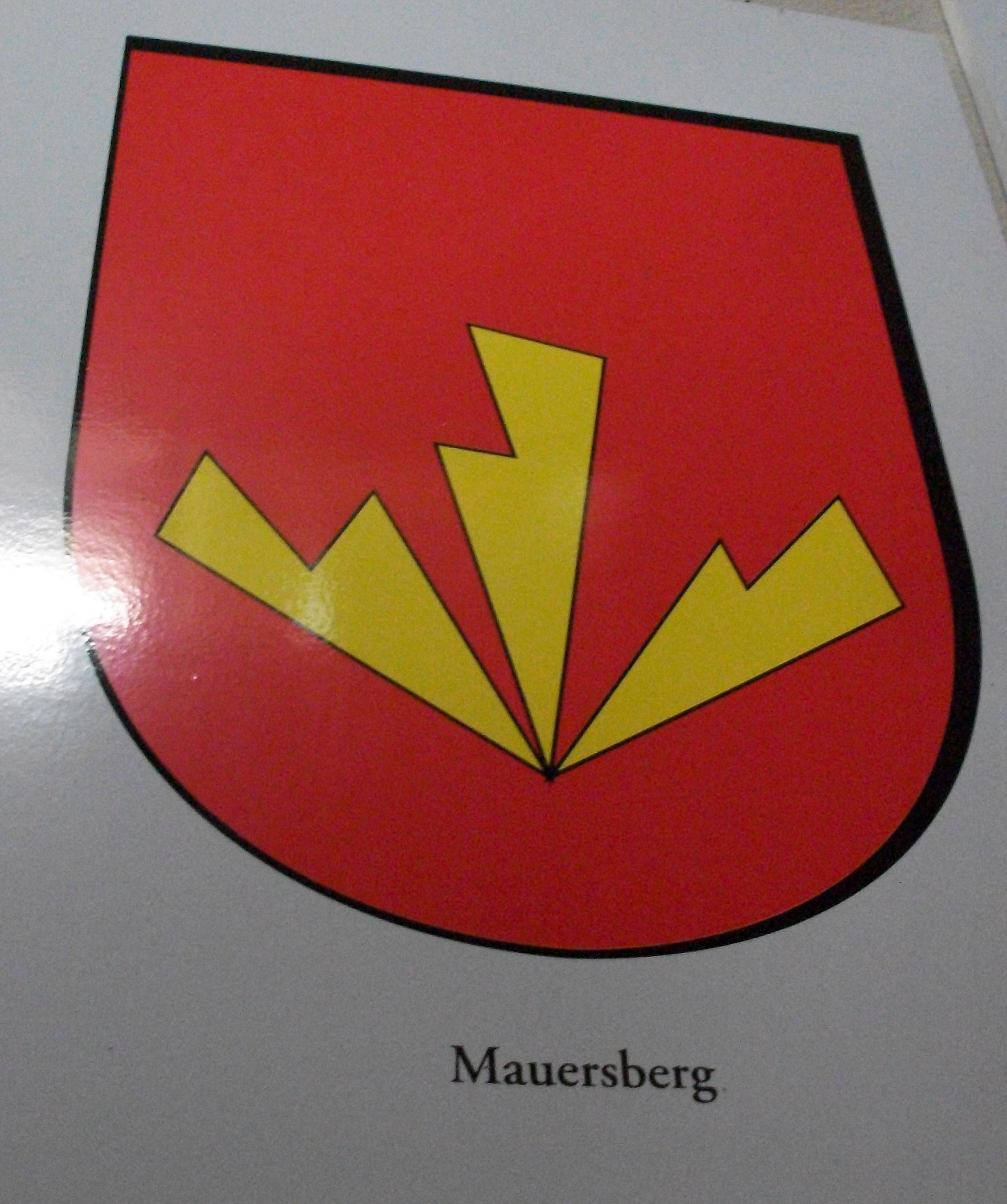
- Seal
- Interactive map of Mauersberg
- Coordinates: 50°36′32″N 13°5′25″E
- Country: Germany
- State: Saxony
- District: Erzgebirgskreis
- Municipality: Großrückerswalde
- Established: 1 January 1994
- Elevation: 549 m (1,801 ft)

Population (9 May 2011)
  - Total: 656
- Time zone: UTC+1
- Postal code: 09518
- Area code: 03735
- Website: https://www.mauersberg.net/

Mauersberg is a district of the Großrückerswalde municipality in the Erzgebirgskreis district of Saxony, Germany.

== Geography ==
=== Location ===
Mauersberg is located about 6.5 kilometres (4.0 mi) southwest of Marienberg in the Ore Mountains. The village extends over about 1.5 kilometres (0.93 mi) in the valley of a stream flowing north into the Preßnitz.

The state road 221 leads through the village from Marienberg via Großrückerswalde. It ends southwest of the village on the state road 218 Annaberg-Buchholz–Reitzenhain.

== History ==
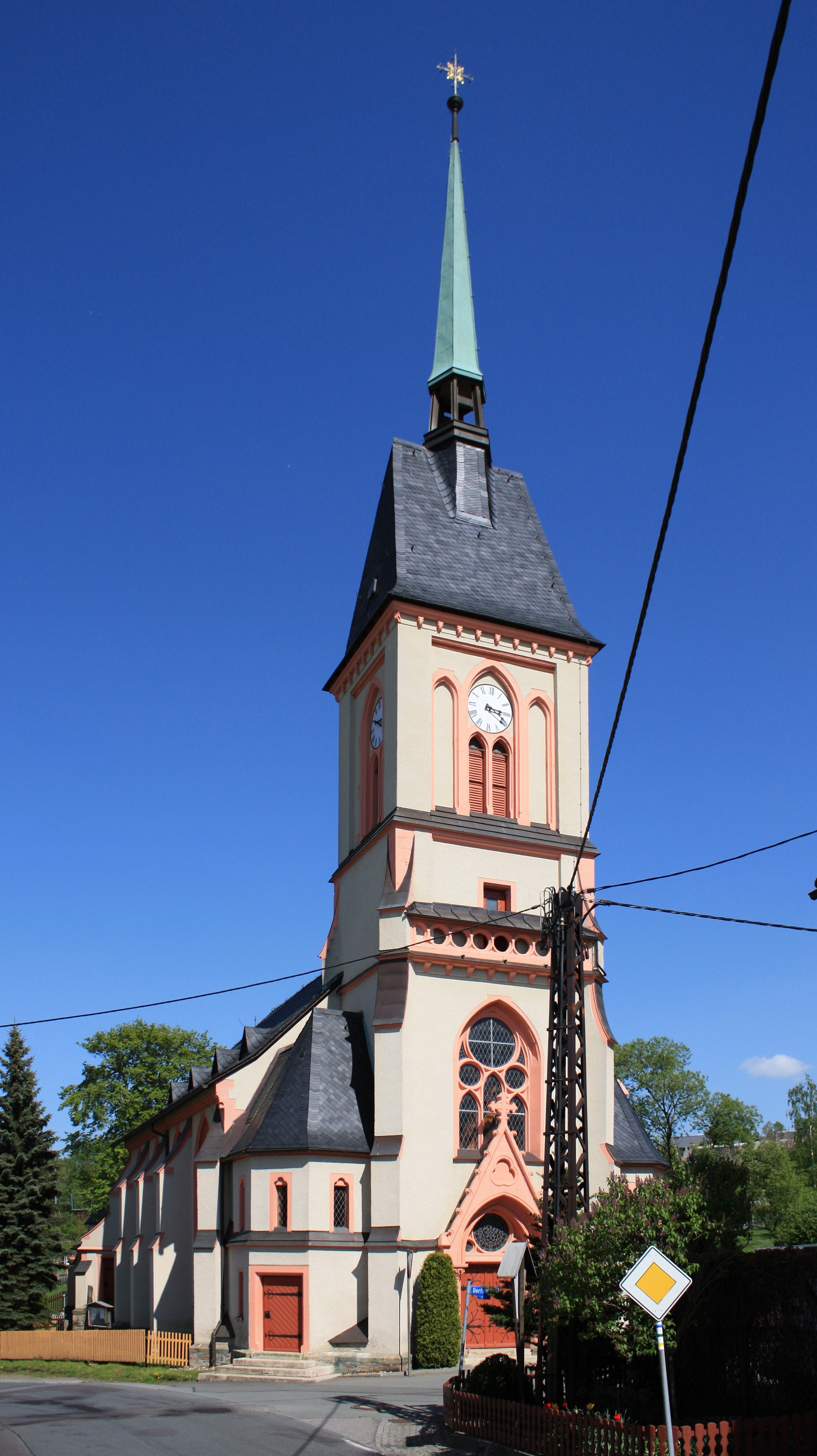
Kirche Mauersberg (Mauersberg Church)

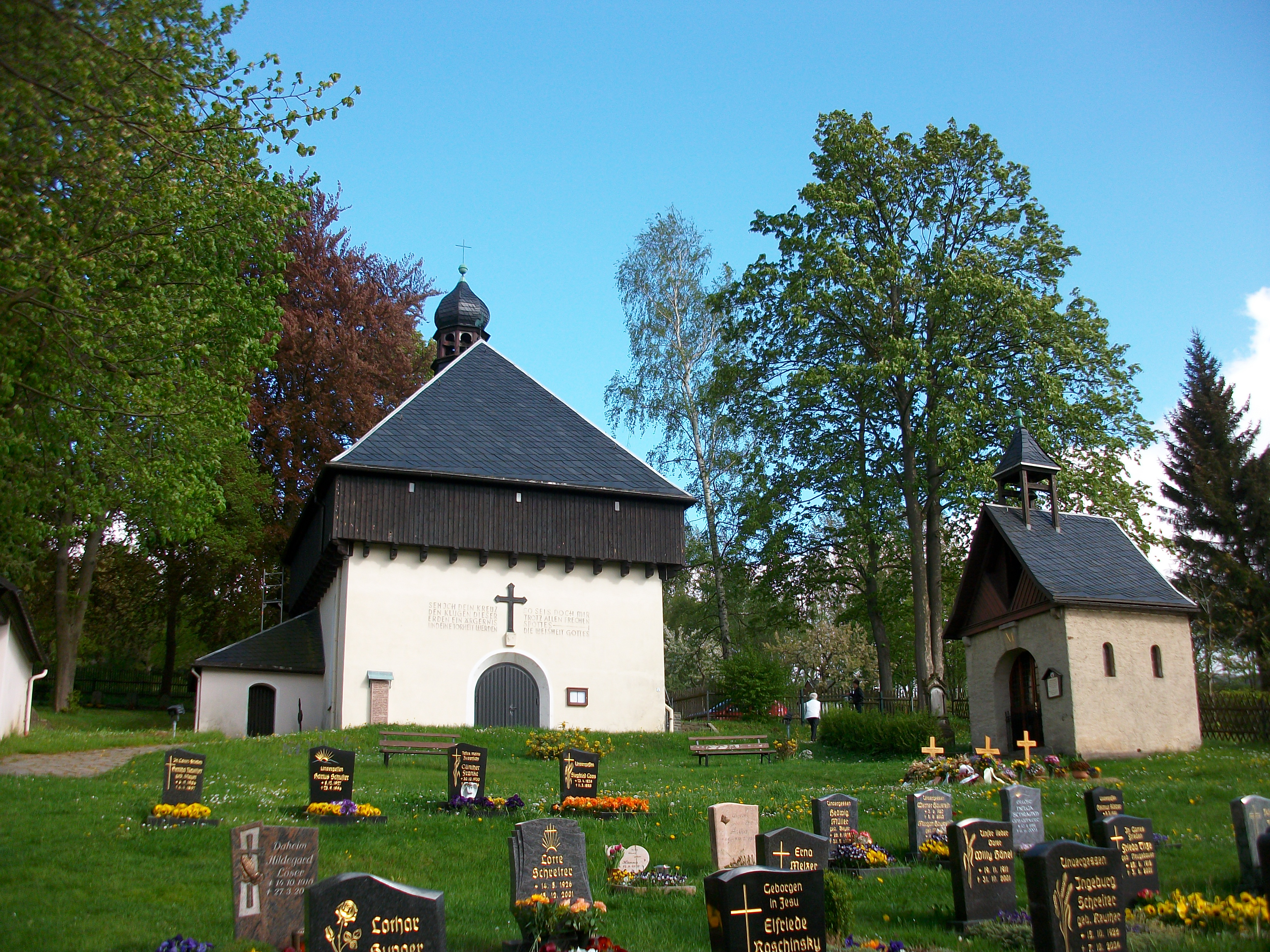
Mauersberg, Kreuzkapelle (Cross Chapel) (2016)

In connection with the Buch Abbey feud, the location was first mentioned in 1291 as Ursberg. At this time it belonged to the property of Buch Abbey, a Cistercian monastery. Around 1300, the monastery's possessions in the Upper Ore Mountains were sold to the landlords of Waldenburg in Wolkenstein.

From the second half of the 15th century, the town had a small wall-walk church which was looked after by the Franciscans of the Annaberg monastery. With the Reformation in 1537, Mauersberg became a branch church of the parish of Großrückerswalde, until it became an independent parish on 14 November 1721. From 1932 to 1938 it was again a branch church of Großrückerswalde.

In 1544 the village was acquired by the mining town of Marienberg. In 1654 an ironstone mine was set up, and the ore extracted was delivered to the hammer works in Preßnitztal for smelting. The colliery ceased operations in 1839. A village school was set up in 1655 and replaced in 1882 by a new building.

In 1844, the Freiberg professor August Breithaupt described the minerals bodenite and muromonerite found in Mauersberg. Until 1856 Mauersberg belonged to the collective municipality of Wolkenstein.

In February 1889, the old wall-walk church was demolished and replaced by a neo-Gothic building by the architect Theodor Quentin, which was consecrated on 17 December 1890.

On 31 May 1892, the Boden bei Wolkenstein stop on the Pressnitz Valley Railway opened, giving Mauersberg access to the railway network, albeit deep in the valley and about 1.6 kilometres (0.99 mi) from the town center. Passenger services finally ceased on 1 October 1984.

The connection to the electrical grid took place in 1913, but the connection to the central drinking water supply was not made until 1970. In 1939, a Wehrmacht air base was set up on the so-called Richterhöhe.

In the course of land reform in 1949 Mauersberg had 44 farms with 148 employees.

The Kreuzkapelle (Cross Chapel) Mauersberg, donated by Rudolf Mauersberger, was built between 1949 and 1953 and is modeled on the demolished wall-walk church. The chapel was consecrated on 15 July 1953.

In 1956 the LPG "1 May" was founded. It merged with the LPG "Vorwärts" Mildenau in 1974.

On 1 January 1994, Mauersberg was incorporated into Großrückerswalde.

== Culture and attractions ==
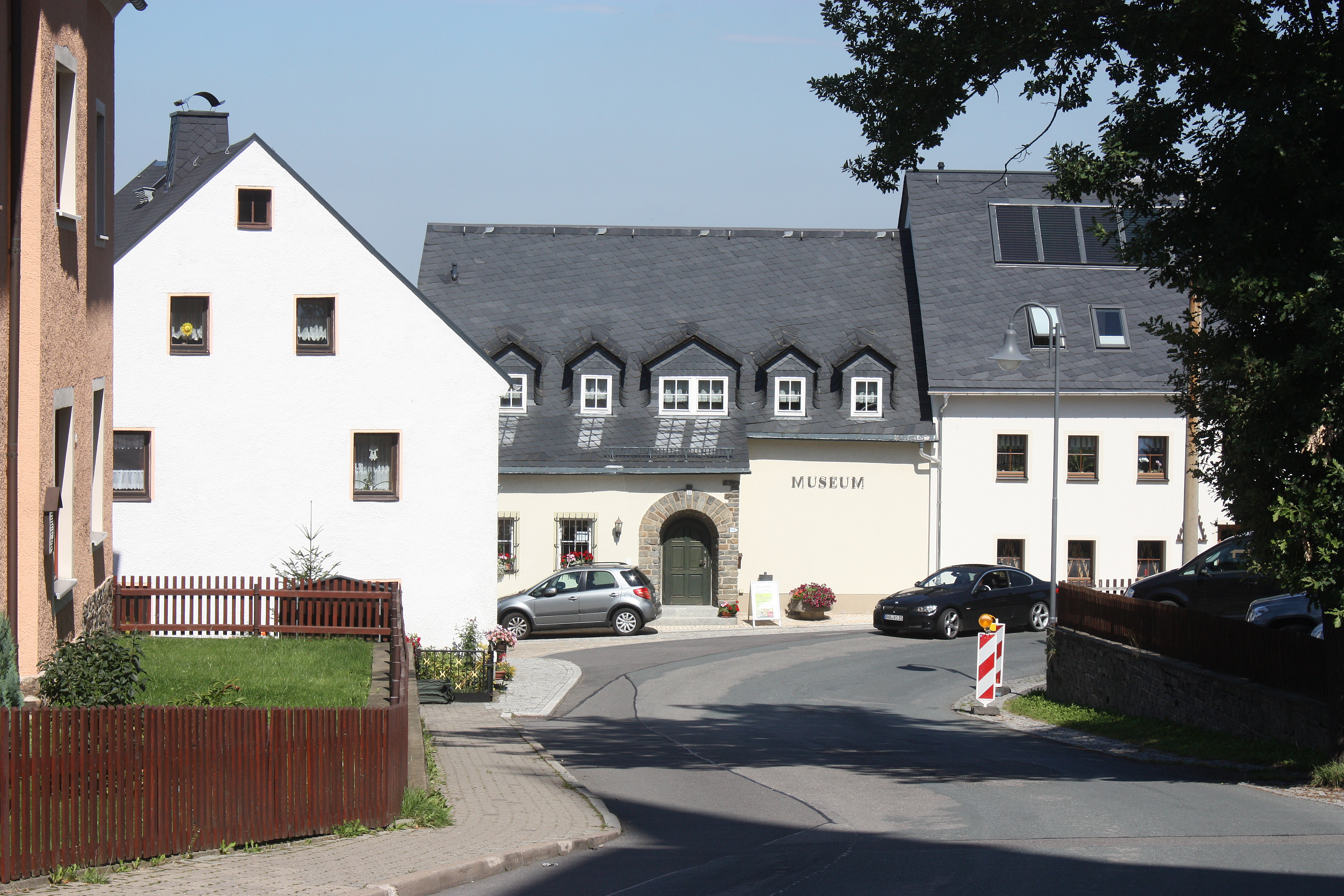
Museum

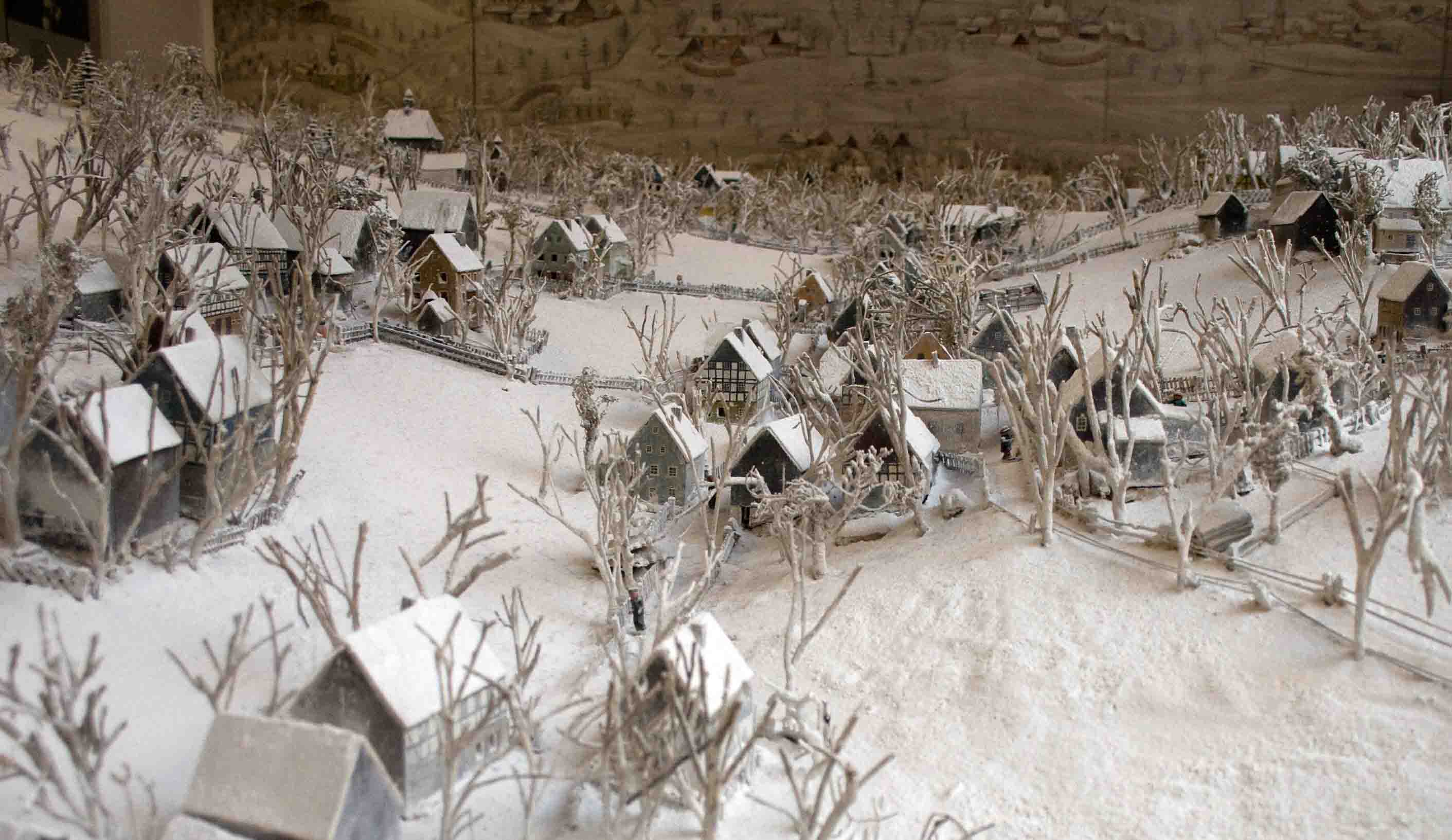
Village model by Rudolf Mauersberger (1926), exhibited in the Mauersberger Museum

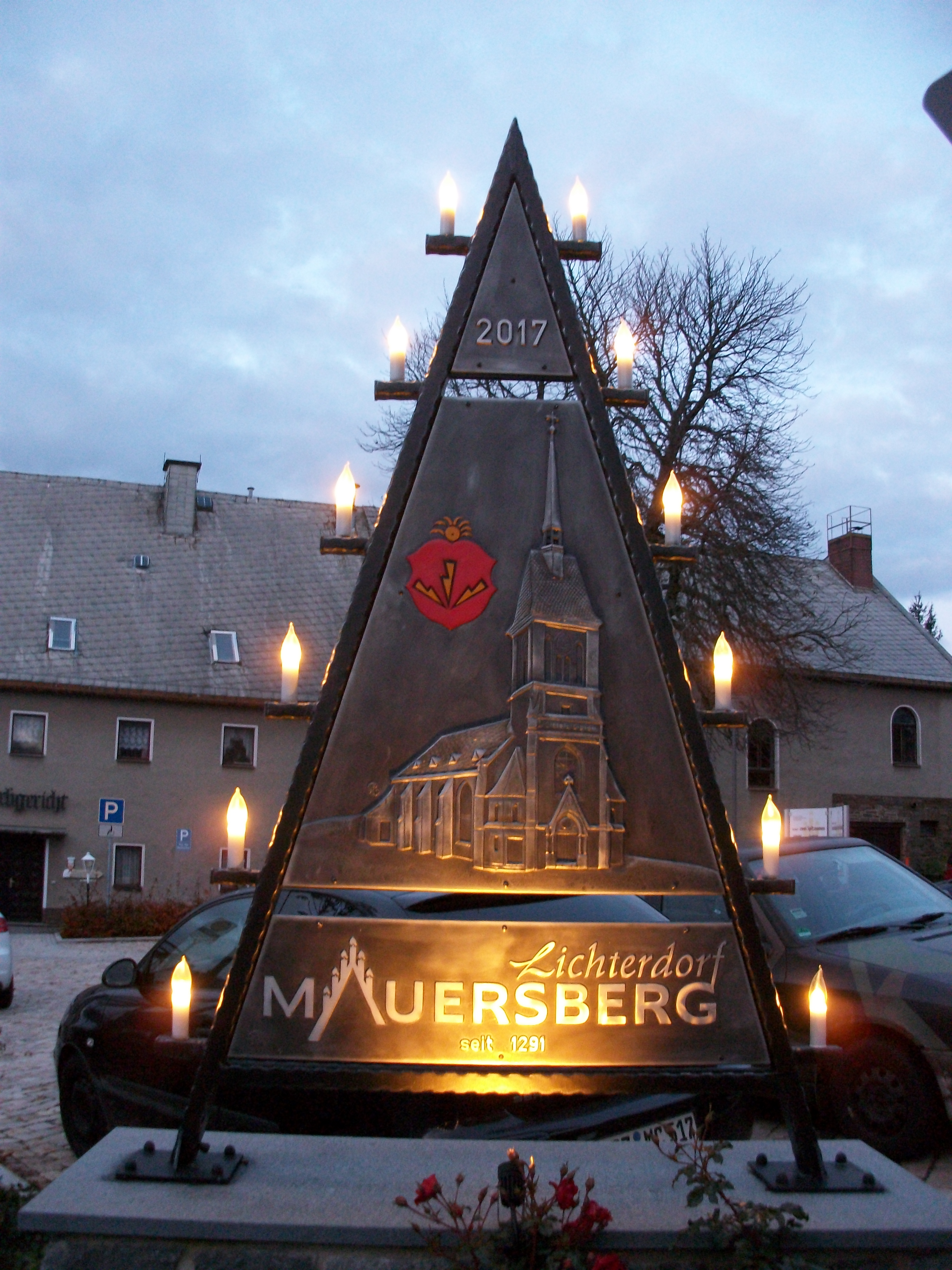
Mauersberger Lichterecke (Christmas artwork)

From 1954 to 1956 Rudolf Mauersberger composed the Gesänge für die Kreuzkapelle zu Mauersberg (Songs for the Kreuzkapelle Mauersberg), the chapel which had been consecrated in 1953.

The Mauersberger Museum was dedicated to the late Kreuzkantor Rudolf Mauersberger in 1973 and expanded in 1984 to pay tribute to the former Thomaskantor Erhard Mauersberger as well. The Mauersberger brothers' estate, preserved in the museum, also includes Rudolf Mauersberger's extensive Ore Mountains collection and a self-made model landscape of Mauersberg. The similarity in name ("Mauersberg" and "Mauersberger") is probably just a strange coincidence.

== Notable people ==
- Johann Christoph Schreiter (1770–1821), Protestant theologian and university teacher in Kiel
- Rudolf Mauersberger (1889–1971), Cantor of the Dresdner Kreuzchor from 1930 to 1971
- Erhard Mauersberger (1903–1982), Thomaskantor from 1961 to 1972
- Brigitte Lange (1939–2012), politician (SPD), member of the Bundestag
