= Heinz Wunderlich =

German composer (1919–2012)

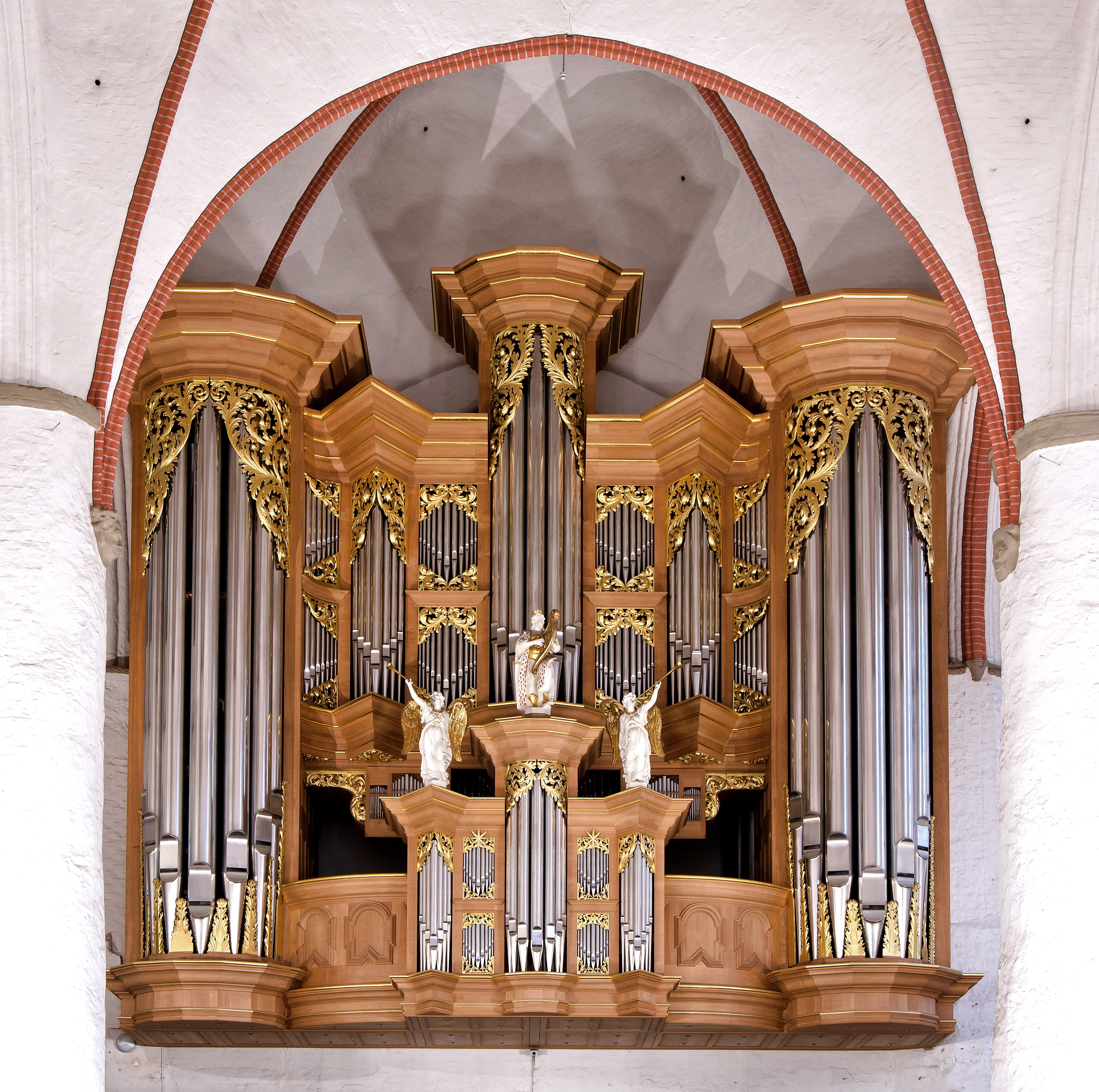
- Arp Schnitger organ in St. Jakobi, Hamburg where Wunderlich worked
- Born: 25 April 1919; Leipzig, Free State of Saxony, Weimar Republic
- Died: 10 March 2012 (aged 92); Großhansdorf, Schleswig-Holstein, Germany
- Occupations: Organist; Church nusician; Academic; Composer; Kirchenmusikdirektor
- Organizations: St. Moritz, Halle; Kirchenmusikhochschule Halle; Musikhochschule Halle; St. Jacobi, Hamburg; Musikhochschule Hamburg

Heinz Wunderlich (25 April 1919 – 10 March 2012) was a German organist, academic, and composer. He was known for playing the organ works of Max Reger. He studied in Leipzig with Karl Straube, a friend of Reger. Wunderlich worked as both a church musician and academic in Halle until 1957 when he fled to West Germany and became a church musician and academic in Hamburg. He toured internationally and attracted students from many countries to study with him in Hamburg. After retiring from teaching, he went on to more compositions.

== Career ==
Born in Leipzig, Wunderlich studied at the Musikhochschule there, with Karl Straube who was a friend of Reger and premiered many of his organ works. He was in Halle the Kirchenmusikdirektor (KMD, director of church music) at the church St. Moritz and lecturer of organ at both the Evangelische Hochschule für Kirchenmusik Halle, an academy of Protestant church music, and at the Staatliche Hochschule für Musik, a state academy of music, from 1943 to 1957. He was known as an organ virtuoso. In 1950, he played all the organ works by Johann Sebastian Bach in a Bach-Marathon of 21 concerts.

After he fled to West Germany in 1958, Wunderlich was KMD at the Hauptkirche Sankt Jacobi (Main church of St. James) in Hamburg, where he took care of the Arp Schnitger organ which Bach had once admired when he applied for the same position. Wunderlich held the post until 1982. He was professor of organ playing and improvisation at the Musikhochschule Hamburg from 1959 to 1989.

Wunderlich toured internationally as a concert organist. His performance of Bach's Toccata and Fugue in D minor was reviewed by Stanley Sadie as "a performance of which Stokowski would not have been ashamed". Students from Europe, the US, and Japan came to Hamburg to study with him. After he retired, he turned more to composition. Wunderlich was also member of the Protestant St. Michael's Fraternity of the Berneuchen Movement.

The last surviving pupil of Karl Straube, he died in Großhansdorf.

== Recordings ==
During his Hamburg period, Wunderlich recorded many works by Bach, Franz Liszt, Max Reger and György Ligeti. His recordings of Reger's works are regarded as exemplary.

Together with his second wife, the violinist Nelly Söregi-Wunderlich, he recorded works for violin and organ by Joseph Rheinberger, by Reger, and of his own composition.

== Work ==
Wunderlich's works are held by the German National Library. His main work is the scenic oratorio for Easter, Maranatha – Unser Herr kommt, composed in 1953. It is based on biblical narrations from Easter to Ascension, including elements from Gregorian Chant and Protestant hymns.

- Kontrapunktische Chaconne, 1938
- Präludium und Doppelfuge im alten Stil, 1939
- Fuga Variata (Fantasie in Form einer Variationsfuge), 1942/1943
- Partita on "Macht hoch die Tür", 1946
- Mixolydische Toccata on "Gelobet seist du, Jesu Christ", 1947
- Drei Motetten, 1956
- Orgelsonate über ein Thema, 1956
- Sonata Tremolanda Hiroshima, 1984
- Introduktion und Toccata über den Namen B-A-C-H, 1988
- Invocatio "Dona nobis pacem", 1993
- Sonate über den Psalm Jona, 1996
- Variationen Twelvetonata für Violine und Orgel, 1998
- Emotionen und Fuge per Augmentationem et Diminutionem über ein gegebenes Thema von Johann Nepomuk David, 2002
