= Annelies Burmeister =

German operatic contralto singer (1928–1988)

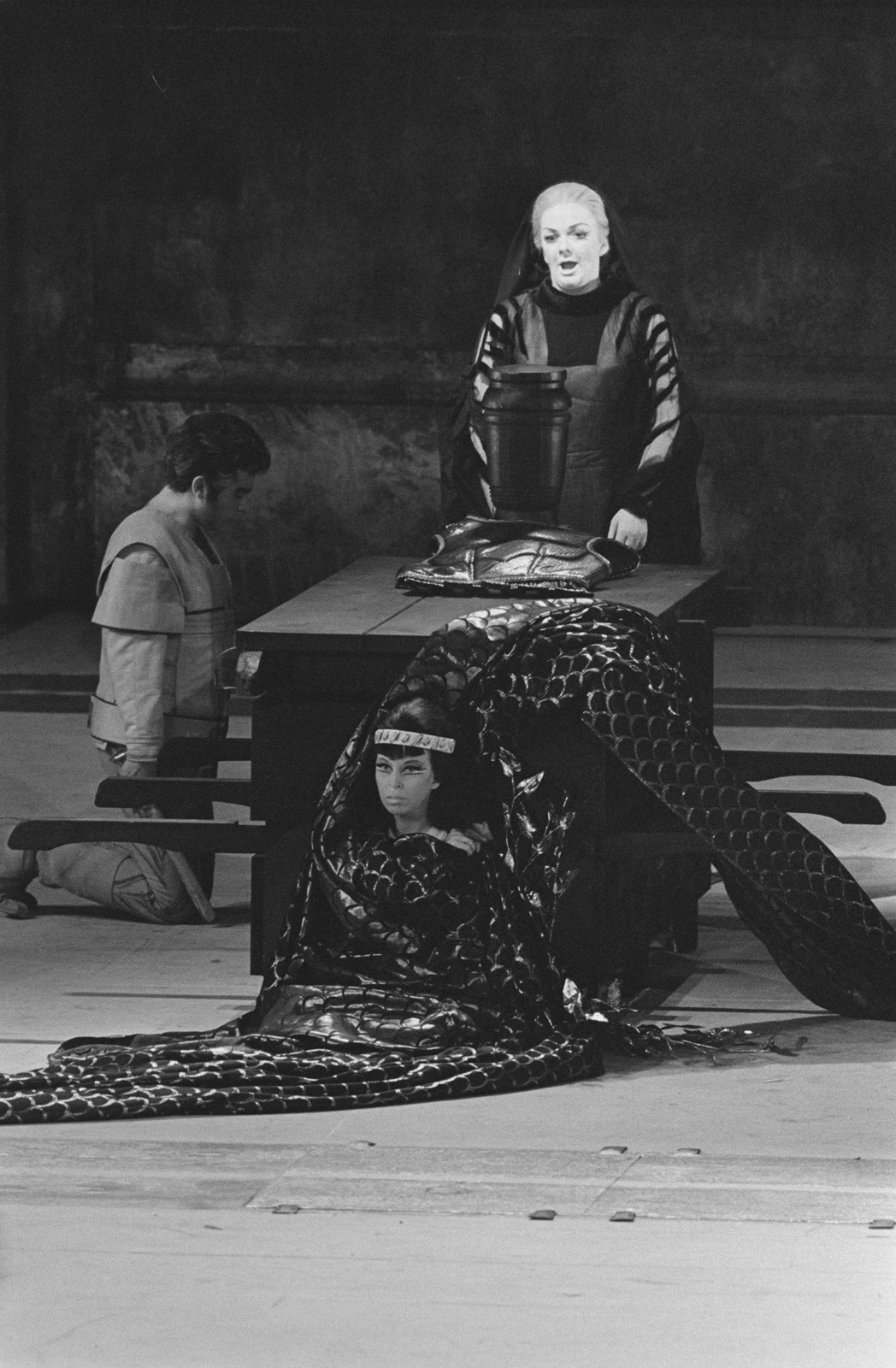
- Burmeister (top) as Cornelia in Handel's Giulio Cesare, Berlin, 1970, with Sylvia Geszty (bottom), and Peter Schreier (left)
- Born: 25 November 1928; Ludwigslust, Germany
- Died: 16 June 1988 (aged 59); Berlin, Germany
- Occupation: Opera singer

Annelies Burmeister (25 November 1928 in Ludwigslust – 16 June 1988 in Berlin) was a German contralto and actress.

Burmeister studied at the Hochschule für Musik in Weimar. She was a member of the Deutsche Oper in Berlin and made several guest appearances with other ensembles, including the Hamburg State Opera and the Paris Opera. She performed at the Bayreuth Festival in 1966 and 1967, where her roles included Fricka and Siegrune in Der Ring des Nibelungen conducted by Karl Böhm. which has been released on Compact Discs. Also in her discography is her interpretation of Mary in Der fliegende Holländer, with Theo Adam and Anja Silja, conducted by Otto Klemperer for EMI, in 1968. She sang Brahms' Alto Rhapsody and Lieder for VEB ETERNA in 1968 and 1971 with the Rundfunkchor Leipzig conducted by Horst Neumann, reissued on CD 0031402BC by Berlin Classics in 1996. Burmeister sang in Beethoven's 9th Symphony with Paul Kletzki conducting the Czech Philharmonic for Supraphon label.
