= Rudolf Mauersberger =

German choral conductor and composer

- Rudolf Mauersberger, c. 1930
- Born: 29 January 1889; Mauersberg, Großrückerswalde, Kingdom of Saxony, German Empire
- Died: 22 February 1971 (aged 82); Dresden, Bezirk Dresden, East Germany
- Occupations: Choral conductor; Kreuzkantor; Composer
- Organization: Dresdner Kreuzchor

Rudolf Mauersberger (29 January 1889 – 22 February 1971) was a German choral conductor and composer. His younger brother Erhard was also a conductor and composer.

== Career ==
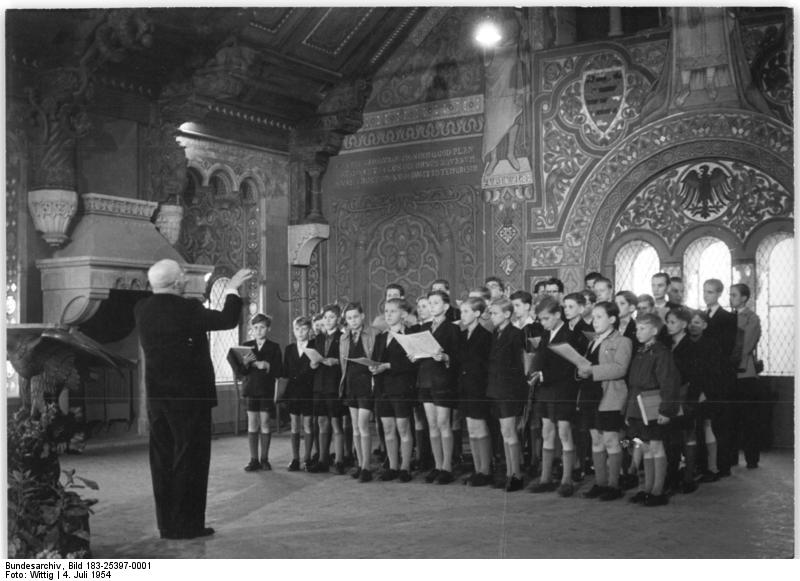
Mauersberger conducting the Dresdner Kreuzchor, Wartburg 1954

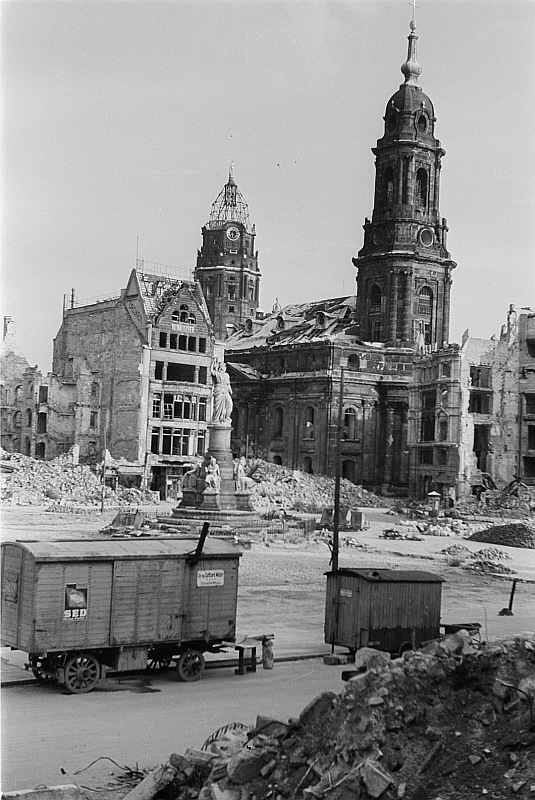
The ruins of the Kreuzkirche in 1945

After positions in Aachen and Eisenach, he became director of the renowned Dresdner Kreuzchor in 1930, a position he held until his death. In May 1933, Mauersberger became a member of the Nazi Party; there are strong indications though that he tried to minimize the influence of the NS-Ideology and in particular of the Hitler-Jugend onto the choir. He refused to stage NS-songs with the choir, and continued to perform the works of banned composers such as Felix Mendelssohn Bartholdy and Günter Raphael, at least as late as 1938.

Probably his most famous work is the motet Wie liegt die Stadt so wüst (How desolate lies the city), written after the destruction of Dresden in February 1945. The text is taken from the Lamentations of Jeremiah, verses 1,1.4.9.13; 2,15; 5,17.20–21. The work is often seen as a bemoaning of the destroyed city, but given the biblical context, it can also apply to the whole of Germany and her people, the destruction of the country being punishment for its iniquities. Mauersberger's Dresden Requiem also reflects the destruction. He wrote a Passion music after St Luke, Passionsmusik nach dem Lukasevangelium, and the Dresdner Te Deum.

== Selected works ==
Choral cycles for soloists and mixed choir a capella

- Tag und Ewigkeit, 1943
- Weihnachtszyklus der Kruzianer (Christmas Cycle of the Kreuzchor), 1944–1946, including "Kleiner Dresdner Weihnachtszyklus" (excerpts), 1951 (de)
- Chorzyklus Dresden (Choral Cycle Dresden), 1945–1950, finished 1955, including Wie liegt die Stadt so wüst
- Erzgebirge, 1946–1954
- Der kleine Jahreskreis, 1950

Religious works

- Christvesper mit Turmgesängen, 1932–1963
- Christmette, 1936
- Fangt euer Tagwerk fröhlich an, 5 kleine Spruchmotetten 1940, 1943
- Ostermette, 1941
- Dresdner Te Deum, 1944/45
- Passionsmusik nach dem Lukasevangelium, 1947
- Dresdner Requiem, 1947/48 (de)
- Geistliche Sommermusik, 1948
- Eine kleine Weihnachtskantate (Christmas cantata), 1948
- Motette vom Frieden, 1953
- Evangelische Messe, 1954
- Gesänge für die Kreuzkapelle zu Mauersberg, 1954–1956 (de)

Secular works

- Maiwärts, Frühlingsode (Ode for spring), 1917/18
- Pfeifen, 1942
- Kritik des Herzens, 1958
- Habt Ruh und Frieden, Gedächtnisgesang, 1943
- Drei Jahreszeitengedichte, 1965/66

Instrumental music

- Piano trio in C minor, 1913/14
- Introduktion, Ciaconna und Choral E minor for organ, 1912–1914
- Introduktion und Passacaglia A minor for organ, 1912–1914
- Präludium und Doppelfuge (prelude and double fugue) D minor for organ, 1912–1914
- Freie Orgelwerke, 1914–1916
- Symphony E minor ("Tragische"), 1914–1916

== Recordings ==
with the Dresdner Kreuzchor:

- Bach: Mass in B minor
- Schütz: Geistliche Chormusik
- Schütz: Psalmen Davids

with the Kreuzchor and the Thomanerchor, conducted together with Erhard Mauersberger:

- Bach: Matthäuspassion
