= Karl Straube =

German organist and choral conductor (1873–1950)

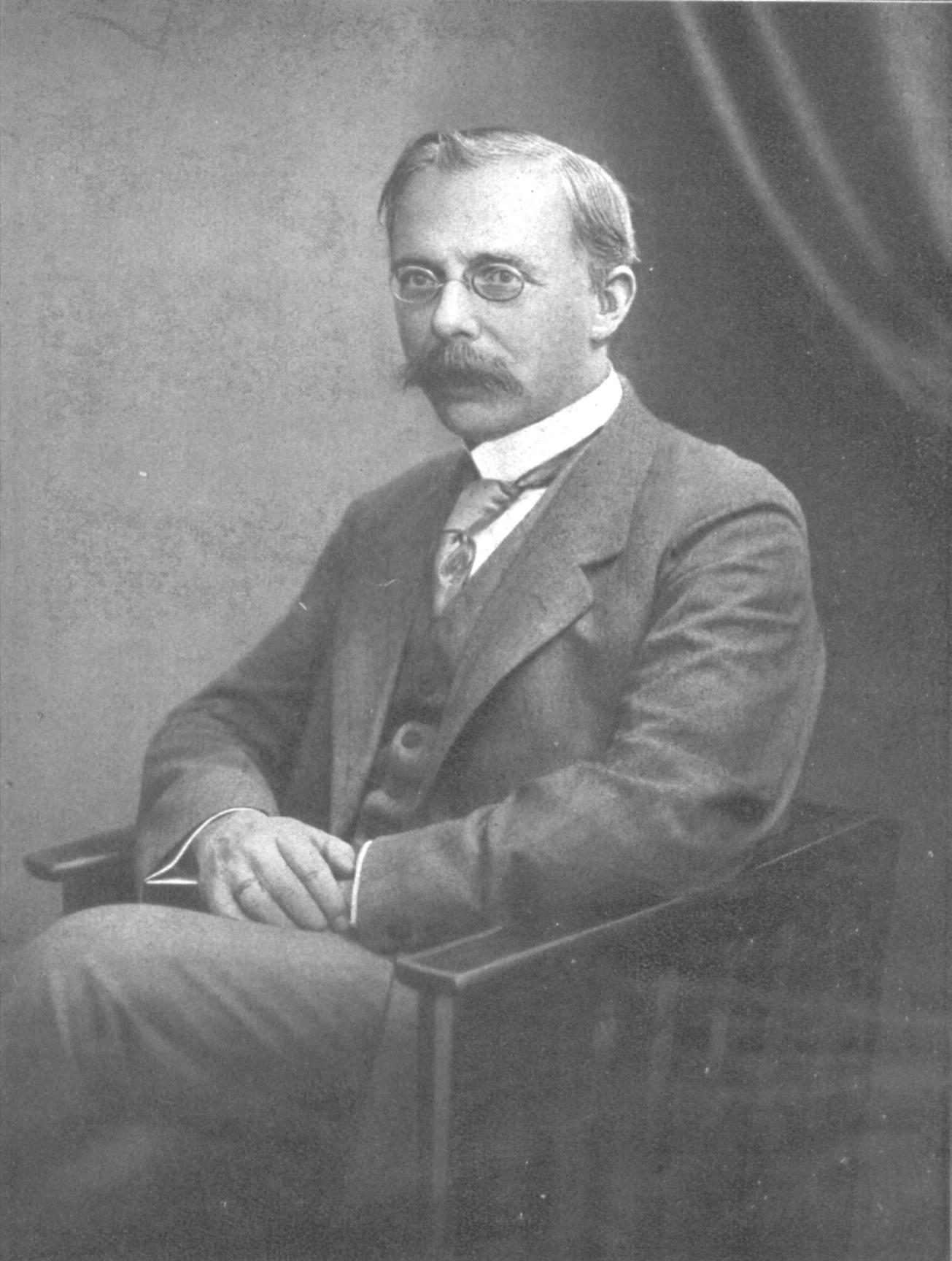
- Born: Montgomery Rufus Karl Siegfried Straube; 6 January 1873; Berlin, German Empire
- Died: 27 April 1950 (aged 77); Leipzig, East Germany
- Occupations: Organist; conductor

Montgomery Rufus Karl Siegfried Straube (6 January 1873 – 27 April 1950) was a German church musician, organist, and choral conductor, famous above all for championing the abundant organ music of Max Reger.

== Career ==
Born in Berlin, Straube studied organ under Heinrich Reimann there from 1894 to 1897 and became a widely respected concert organist. In 1897 he was appointed organist at Willibrordi-Dom (St Willibrord Cathedral) in Wesel, but left in 1902 to take up the position of organist at the Thomaskirche in Leipzig.

He gave up his career as a performer relatively early in order to pursue teaching and publishing, particularly the music of Max Reger, though he still kept his position at the Thomaskirche. He was also appointed to the organ faculty of the Leipzig Conservatorium in 1907, receiving the title of "Royal Professor" in 1908. This most honorary title, which is seemingly astounding for a professor of only one year, reflects more on Straube's cleverness than his merit. Since he was offered a job in Berlin (that supposedly paid ℳ 6,000), he wrote a letter of requests to his superior. These subtle "demands" were cleverly wrought (so as not to come off poorly, as his tenure at this point was rather short). He, among other things, requested a raise from ℳ 1,000 to ℳ 5,000 and also requested that the Wilhelm Sauer organ of 1888 at the Thomaskirche be enlarged (not only in manual compass—an extension from f3-a3, but also in size—all done under his supervision by the firm of Wilhelm Sauer). He succeeded Gustav Schreck as cantor of the Thomasschule and director of the Thomanerchor in 1918 and held the post until 1939. His contribution to the history of organ performance was chiefly through his advocacy of the music of Reger and his many students, including Heinz Wunderlich and Karl Richter.

Having received the older tradition of organ playing from Reimann in Berlin, Straube revolutionized his technique in collaboration with the orchestral-style instruments of Sauer (and the encouragement from this mentor who spoke of the "unplayable" organ works of Reger). This allowed him to interpret music by using the full resources of Sauer's massive instruments, with their stop-change mechanisms and expressive divisions; however, he also performed on organs that contained no such devices as well and simply adapted the music accordingly (even Reger was played on purely mechanical instruments with no mechanisms to assist the player, though these were mid-period Romantic organs built by Haas, etc., i.e. not organs of the Orgelbewegung movement).

== Writing ==
Straube considered himself more of a historian than a musician, and changed opinions many times throughout his life. He edited editions of works by "old masters" (Buxtehude, Bach, etc.) and also editions of works by Reger (the latter of which differed highly from the composer's autographs). However, Straube compiled these editions "with the approval of the composer," regarding his many "subjective" editorial markings (most of which completely change the architectural concept of Reger's music). This is exactly how he performed and advocated his editions—he stated that his editorial markings were not dry thoughts made at a desk, but rather inspirations that came to him at the instrument itself. Many reviews comment on his obsession with the clarity of contrapuntal voices and variety and color of his creative registrations.

Straube is a conundrum and the validity of his editions has been brought into question in most recent Reger scholarship. It has been presupposed by many that later in life he advocated the principles of the Orgelbewegung movement, which looked to an "historically pure" interpretation of old music (especially Bach) and also looked back to the organ building principles of the Baroque period (which were largely misinterpreted). Nevertheless, Straube never advocated for this movement, though he did move away from the ideals of the Romantic organ to what the Germans called a compromise [Komprimiß] organ (in America, this style of organ is referred to as "eclectic", i.e. one that plays almost all of the organ repertory, but not necessarily well). This is demonstrated by his being responsible for the rebuild of the Leipzig Conservatory Sauer organ in 1927. However, he went back and forth between supporting the "eclectic" organ and the Romantic organ and certainly did not want Reger to fall out of fashion during this extreme shift in the organ world (i.e. the Orgelbewegung movement). Reger's music was not like that of Wagner, as he looked back to Bach for his highly contrapuntal writing (despite his "modern" harmonic—highly chromatic—language). This is precisely why Straube stated that even Reger can be performed on an organ lacking orchestral colors and the ability to employ these subtle color changes (i.e. one with only the ability to realize dynamic changes in a terraced manner, referring to the "Neo-Baroque" organs of the Orgelbewegung movement). He made this statement in the preface (1938) to his final Reger edition of Ein feste Burg ist unser Gott, op. 27 (not because he advocated this aesthetic change, but rather for the sake of his good friend and colleague's musical contributions).

In his musical biography of Straube, musicologist Christopher Anderson writes: "As the eleventh successor to J. S. Bach in the cantorate of St. Thomas School, Leipzig, he focused the choir's mission as curator of Bach's works and, in the unstable political climate of the interwar years, as international emissary for German art. His fraught exit from the cantorate in 1939 bore the scars of his Nazi affiliations and issued in a final decade of struggle and disillusionment as German society collapsed."

== Death ==
Straube was buried in the Südfriedhof, Leipzig in 1950. His grave was thoroughly restored on behalf of the Paul-Benndorf-Gesellschaft in 2021.

== Sources ==
- Anderson, Christopher (2003). Max Reger and Karl Straube: Perspectives on an Organ Performing Tradition. Routledge. ISBN 978-1-351-55876-1.
- Anderson, Christopher (2022). Karl Straube (1873–1950): Germany's Master Organist in Turbulent Times. Eastman Studies in Music. University of Rochester Press. ISBN 9781648250385. (also available in EPDF and EPUB format in April 2022)
- Corinna Wörner: Zwischen Anpassung und Resistenz. Der Thomanerchor Leipzig in zwei politischen Systemen. Studien und Materialien zur Musikwissenschaft, Bd. 123. Georg Olms Verlag, Hildesheim 2023. (Abstract) ISBN 978-3-487-16232-4.
