= Lipsius =

Lipsius is a surname. Notable people with the surname include:

- Constantin Lipsius (1832–1894), German architect
- Fred Lipsius (born 1943), American musician
- Ida Marie Lipsius (1837–1927), German writer and music historian
- Justus Lipsius (1547–1606), Flemish humanist
- Justus Hermann Lipsius (1834–1920), German classical scholar
- Richard Adelbert Lipsius (1830–1892), German theologian
