= Ida Marie Lipsius =

German writer and music historian (1837–1927)

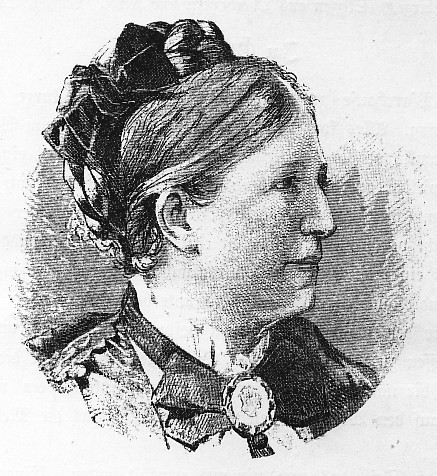

Ida Marie Lipsius (30 December 1837 in Leipzig – 2 March 1927 in Schmölen), alias La Mara, was a German writer and music historian.

== Life ==
Lipsius was born as daughter of the later director of the Leipzig Thomasschule Karl Heinrich Adelbert Lipsius and grew up at Leipzig, where she was given a profound musical training, thus by the Saxon composer Richard Müller. Her three brothers were the theologian Richard Adelbert Lipsius, the architect Constantin Lipsius and the classical scholar Justus Hermann Lipsius. In 1856, at nineteen, she met Franz Liszt at a concert; she should belong from henceforth to his closer friends. During the ending 19th and starting 20th century, she played an influential role in the German music business, especially at the grand-ducal Weimarian court and in the Richard Wagner circle at Bayreuth. An intimate friend to Liszt's long-time life partner, the princess Carolyne zu Sayn-Wittgenstein, she was distinguished with the title of professor in honor of her eightieth birthday in 1917.

== Work ==
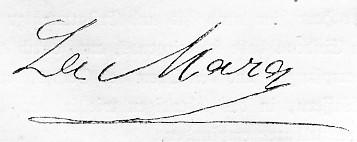
La Mara's signature

Besides several early written travel sketches, under her alias "La Mara", Marie published a lot of musician biographies, concerning dead as well as contemporaries of hers, which, beginning from 1867, first were printed in the Westermanns Monatshefte before being edited in the then popular series Musikalische Studienköpfe (Musical study portraits) by the house Breitkopf & Härtel. Her well-nuanced, empathetically written portraits often were inspired by her personal acquaintance to many of whom she described and also may be characterized as authentic testimonies of a female contemporary involved in the German music society of her epoch – a character in which their importance for today music history mostly consists.

Marie Lipsius was the first musicologist to conduct systematic research to identify Beethoven's mysterious "Immortal Beloved": In 1909, she published Therese Brunsvik's Memoirs, and she interpreted her glowing admiration of the composer as a secret love. This was revised after the World War I, when letters and other documents were discovered in the Brunsvik estate, which pointed to Therese's sister Josephine Brunsvik.

A part from her original writings, Marie also took care of an edition of the correspondence of Franz Liszt. In 1917, her autobiography was published.

== Publications ==
=== As author ===
- Musikalische Studienköpfe, 5 vol., Leipzig 1868–1882:
  - Hector Berlioz, Leipzig ^{5}1913.
  - Joseph Haydn, Leipzig ^{5}1913.
  - Adolf Henselt, Leipzig ^{9}1919.
  - Edvard Grieg, Leipzig ^{9}1919.
  - Franz Schubert, Leipzig ^{12}1919.
  - Johann Sebastian Bach, Leipzig ^{7}1919.
  - Johannes Brahms, Leipzig 1919.
  - Richard Wagner, Leipzig ^{12}1919.
  - Robert Schumann, Leipzig ^{12} 1919.
  - Anton Rubinstein, Leipzig ^{9}1920.
  - Carl Maria von Weber, Leipzig ^{12}1920.
  - Felix Mendelssohn, Leipzig ^{12}1920.
  - Franz Liszt, Leipzig ^{13}1920.
  - Georg Friedrich Händel, Leipzig ^{6–7}1921.
  - Hans von Bülow, Leipzig ^{9–10}1921.
  - Wolfgang Amadeus Mozart, Leipzig ^{8–9}1922.
  - Christoph Willibald Gluck, Leipzig ^{6–7}1923.
  - Ludwig van Beethoven, Leipzig ^{10–12}1923.
  - Friedrich Chopin, Leipzig ^{4}1924.
- Classisches und Romantisches aus der Tonwelt, Leipzig 1892.
- Beethovens unsterbliche Geliebte. Das Geheimnis der Gräfin Brunswik und ihre Memoiren, Leipzig 1909.
- Liszt und die Frauen, Leipzig 1911.
- Beethoven und die Brunsviks. Nach Familienpapieren aus Therese Brunsviks Nachlass, Leipzig 1920.
- An der Schwelle des Jenseits. Letzte Erinnerungen an die Fürstin Carolyne Sayn-Wittgenstein, die Freundin Liszts, Leipzig 1925.

=== As editor ===
- Franz Liszt:
  - Franz Liszt's Briefe, 8 vol., Leipzig 1893–1905.
  - Correspondance entre Franz Liszt et Hans von Bülow, Leipzig 1899. (French)
  - Correspondance entre Franz Liszt et Charles Alexandre (Grand-Duc de Saxe), Leipzig 1909. (French)
  - Franz Liszts Briefe an seine Mutter. Aus dem Frz., Leipzig 1918.
- Aus der Glanzzeit der Weimarer Altenburg. Bilder und Briefe aus dem Leben dem Fürstin Carolyne Sayn-Wittgenstein, Leipzig 1906.

== Autobiography ==
- Durch Musik und Leben im Dienste des Ideals, 2 vol., Leipzig 1917.

== Sources ==
- Entry in the Deutsche Biographische Enzyklopädie
