= Karl Heinrich Adelbert Lipsius =

German theologian, philologist and educator

Karl Heinrich Adelbert Lipsius (19 January 1805, in Großhennersdorf – 2 July 1861, in Leipzig) was a German theologian, philologist and educator.

He studied philology and theology at the University of Leipzig, receiving his habilitation in 1827. In the autumn of 1827, he was named conrector at the gymnasium in Gera. In 1832 he began work as a teacher of religious studies at the Thomasschule in Leipzig, where in 1847 he became conrector. In 1861 he succeeded Johann Gottfried Stallbaum as academic rector at Thomasschule, but died soon afterwards in July 1861.

He was the father of theologian Richard Adelbert Lipsius (1830–1892), architect Constantin Lipsius (1832–1894), philologist Justus Hermann Lipsius (1834–1920) and music historian Ida Marie Lipsius (1837-1927).

The Lipsiusstraße, a residential street in Reudnitz was named in his honour in 1908. Today it is located in the district of Reudnitz-Thonberg (Leipzig).

== Published works ==
- De modorvm vsv in Novo Testamento : qvaestionis grammaticae pars prima indicativi vsvm explicans, 1827.
- Commentationes Plautinae, 1836 (with Friedrich Wilhelm Ehrenfried Rost).
- De Aristidis Plutarchei locis quibusdam commentatio, 1860.
- Schulreden bei verschiedenen Gelegenheiten gehalten : mit der Lebensbeschreibung des Verfassers, 1862 – School speeches on various occasions.
- Grammatische Untersuchungen über die biblische Gräcität über die Lesezeichen, 1863 – Grammatical studies of the Biblical Gräcität.
