= Otto Crusius =

Otto Crusius may refer to:

- Ludwig Friedrich Otto Baumgarten-Crusius, (1788–1842), German Protestant divine
- Otto Crusius (1857–1918), German classical scholar
