= List of rectors of Thomasschule zu Leipzig =

Rectors of the Thomasschule zu Leipzig (St. Thomas School of Leipzig), in Leipzig, Germany have included:

- 1676 Jakob Thomasius
- 1730 Johann Matthias Gesner
- 1734 Johann August Ernesti
- 1835 Johann Gottfried Stallbaum
- 1863 Friedrich August Eckstein
