= Crusius =

Crusius is a Latinized German surname, typically from the names Kraus or Krause. It may refer to:

- Christian August Crusius (1715–1775), German philosopher and Protestant theologian
- Ludwig Friedrich Otto Baumgarten-Crusius (1788–1843), German Protestant divine
- Martin Crusius (1524–1607), German classicist, historian, and professor
- Otto Crusius (1857–1918), German classical scholar
- Patrick Crusius (born 1998), perpetrator of the 2019 El Paso Walmart shooting
- Yeda Crusius (born 1944), Brazilian politician
