= Friedrich Wilhelm Ehrenfried Rost =

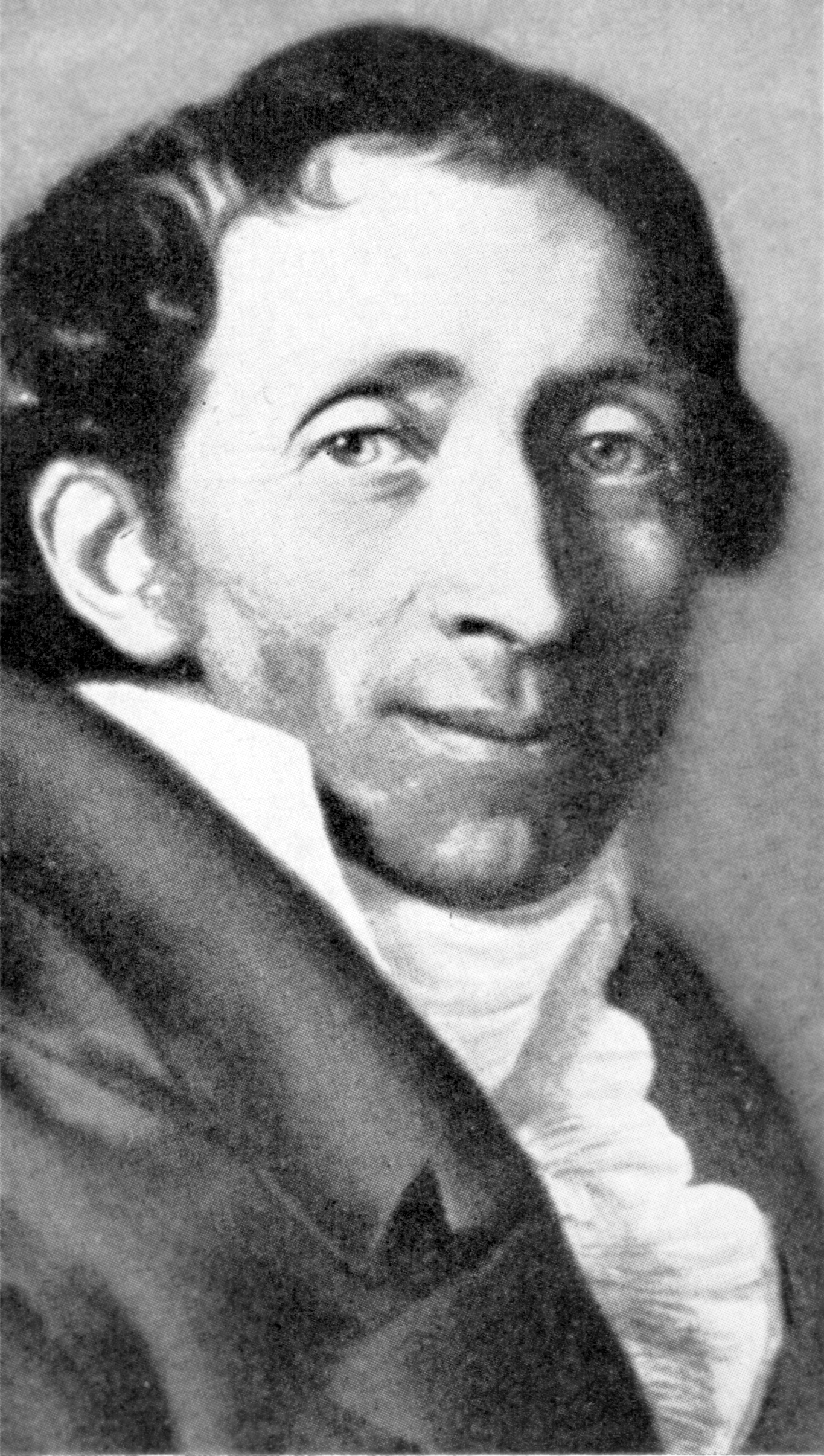
- Friedrich Wilhelm Ehrenfried Rost
- Born: 11 April 1768; Bautzen, Electorate of Saxony
- Died: 12 February 1835 (aged 66); Leipzig, Kingdom of Saxony
- Occupation(s): German theologian and philologist

Friedrich Wilhelm Ehrenfried Rost (11 April 1768 – 12 February 1835) was a German theologian, philosopher and classical philologist.

He studied theology and philology at the University of Leipzig, receiving his doctorate in 1792. In 1794 he served as a vespers minister at the university church, then relocated to Plauen as rector at the lyceum. In 1796 he returned to Leipzig as conrector at the Thomasschule zu Leipzig, where from 1800 to 1835, he held the post of rector.

From 1804 to 1809 he was a privat-docent of philosophy at the University of Leipzig, where afterwards, he served as an associate professor until his death in 1835. He was a member of the Lateinischen Gesellschaft zu Jena and the Historisch-Theologischen Gesellschaft zu Leipzig.

== Published works ==
- Analecta critica, 5 parts., Leipzig 1802–1807.
- Rostiorum Latina Carmina, cum appendice quorundam Irmischii Poematum, Leipzig 1812. Epigrams by his father, Christoph Jeremias Rost (1718–1790).
- Die Feyer des 600jährigen Bestehens der Thomasschule zu Leipzig, Leipzig 1822 – The Feyer of the 600th anniversary of Thomasschule in Leipzig.
- Neun Lustspiele des M. Accius Plautus. Epidikus, Pseudolus, Mostallaria, Der Kaufmann, Der Perser, Amphitruo, Curculio, Truculentus und Pönulus, Leipzig 1836 – Nine comedies of Titus Maccius Plautus : Epidicus, Pseudolus, Mostellaria, Mercator (play), Persa (play), Amphitryon, Curculio, Truculentus and Poenulus; after Rost's death, they were collected and edited by Karl Heinrich Adelbert Lipsius.
- Opuscula Plautina, Leipzig 1836 (collected and published in two volumes by Karl Heinrich Adelbert Lipsius).
