= Karl Heinrich Heydenreich =

German philosopher and poet (1764-1801)

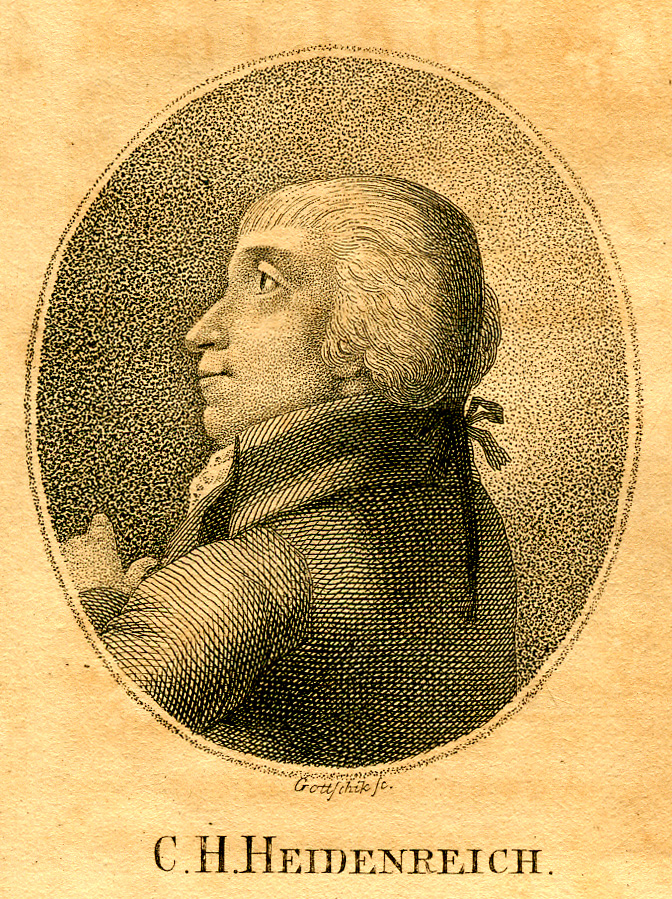
Karl Heinrich Heydenreich (1815)

Karl Heinrich Heydenreich (19 February 1764 – 26 April 1801) was a German philosopher and poet.

Heydenreich was born in Stolpen and was educated at the Thomasschule zu Leipzig and the University of Leipzig. In 1787 he became professor of philosophy at Leipzig. Writing works on Spinoza in the late 1780s, he became increasingly influenced by Immanuel Kant: his Betrachtungen (1790-1) was "the first real example of a Kantian philosophical theology". Forced to give up his professorship in 1797, he died unsalaried in Burgwerben.

== Works ==
- Über Mendelssohns Darstellung der Spinozismus, 1787
- Natur und Gott nach Spinoza, 1789
- System der Ästhetik, 1790
- Betrachtungen über die Philosophie der natürlichen Religion, 2 vols., 1790-1
- System des Naturrechts nach kritischen Prinzipien, 1794-5
- Briefe über den Atheismus, 1796
- Grundsätze der Kritik der Lächerlichen mit Hinsicht auf das Lustpiel, 1797
- Psychologische Entwickelung des Aberglaubens und der damit verknüpften Schwärmerey, 1798
- Vesta. Keine Schriften zur Philosophie des Lebens, 5 vols., 1798-1801
