= Georg Österreich =

German Baroque composer and collector

Georg Österreich (baptized on 17 March 1664 – 6 June 1735) was a German Baroque composer and collector. He is regarded as the founder of the so-called Bokemeyer collection (German: Sammlung Bokemeyer) which is now housed in the Staatsbibliothek in Berlin and is considered one of the most important music collections of the late 17th and early 18th century.

== Life ==
=== Youth (1664–1686) ===
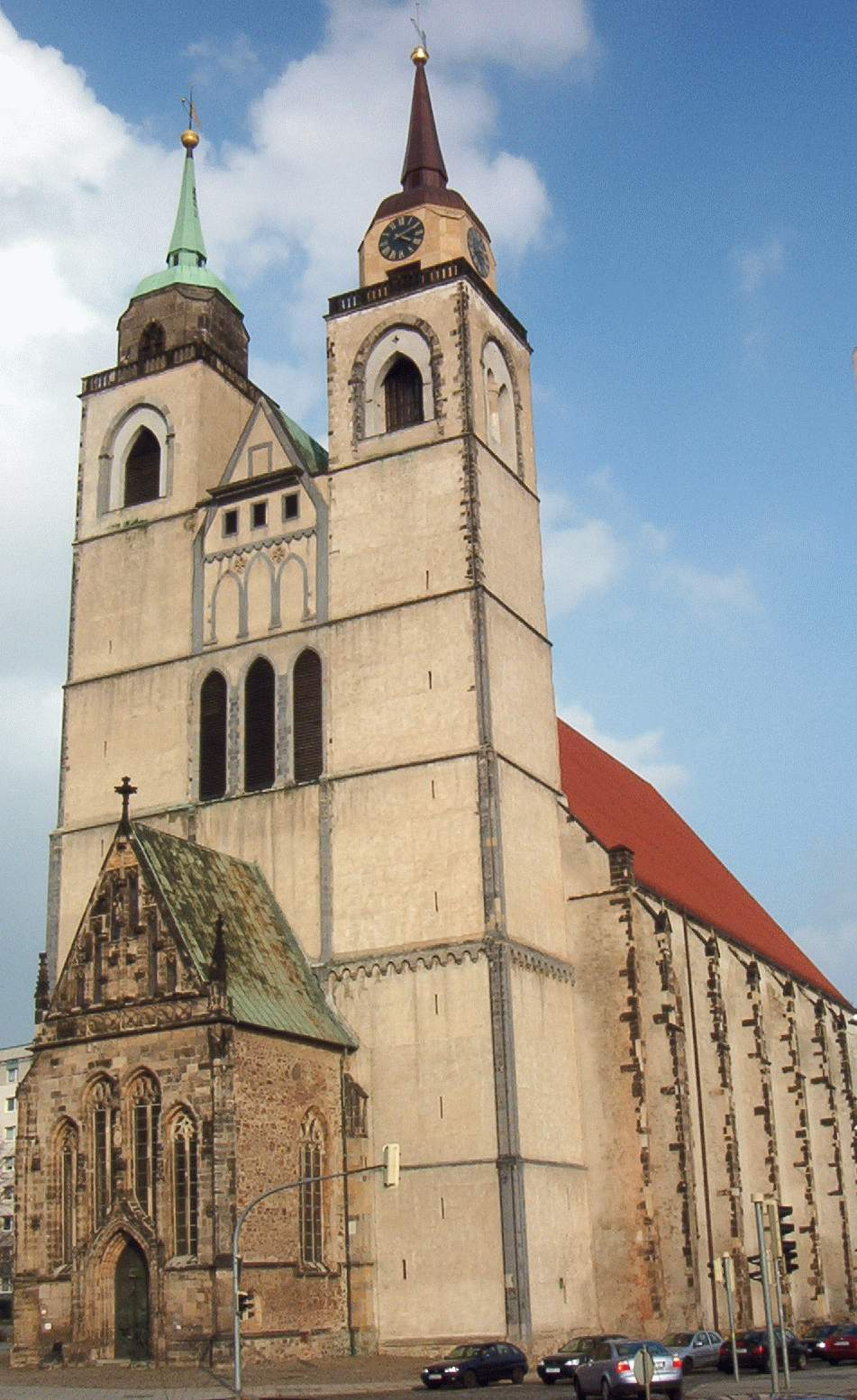
The Johanniskirche in Magdeburg where Österreich was baptized

Österreich was born in March 1664, the son of brewer Johann (or Hans) Österreich and Elisabeth Österreich and was baptized on March 17 in the Johanniskirche in Magdeburg. The Österreich family came originally from Augsburg and belonged to a very distinguished patrician family. In 1552, they fell out of favor with the Emperor when they tried to reinstate the guild government which had been in place prior to 1547. As a result, they lost many of the rights associated with their position and were forced to leave Augsburg. A majority of the family settled in Central Germany.

Österreich received his first musical education from his godfather, the Magdeburg cantor Johann Scheffler, who also instructed Johann Theile and was one of the most respected musicians of his time. However, little is known of Scheffler's life and there is no record of his skill as a composer.

Österreich appears to have been very musically gifted and in 1678, at age 14, he applied, with a letter of recommendation from Scheffler, for a position at the Thomasschule zu Leipzig (St. Thomas School of Leipzig) where his brother, Michael, had also attended. The headmaster of the school noted in his diary: "Michael Oesterreich [...] presented to me his brother Georg (entering his 14th year) son of Johann, townsman and beer brewer in Magdeburg: to date has gone to school in Magdeburg and sat in Class II. [...] In music, the cantor gave him praise and a good recommendation."

Österreich committed to attend the Thomasschule for at least two years and offered to stay many more years. His teacher at this time was the cantor Johann Schelle, who recognized the exceptional abilities of his young student and granted him as much support as possible. He soon became an important part of the weekly choir at the St. Thomas Church.

In the summer of 1680, the plague broke out in Leipzig. Despite strict safety measures by the school leadership, many at the school fell ill. A general panic spread, and the students who had not yet fallen ill fled the city. Among them were Georg and his brother Michael, who returned to Magdeburg. At that point, Österreich's parents sent him to Hamburg, to the Gelehrtenschule des Johanneums to continue his education, which was being led at that time by the Baroque composer, Joachim Gerstenbüttel. On account of his voice, Österreich soon achieved a modest celebrity in Hamburg and was hired as an alto in the council choir. In this position he took part in all the important religious and secular celebrations in the city and made the acquaintance of influential merchants and townspeople. Exactly how long Österreich kept his position in Hamburg is not certain. Likely the breaking of his voice brought on the end of this position. In the fall of 1683, he enrolled at Leipzig University, though this was probably only to fill the time as his voice finished changing, because by the end of 1684 he was once again working as a singer, now as a tenor, in the Oper am Gänsemarkt theater in Hamburg.

=== Brunswick-Wolfenbüttel (1686–1689) ===
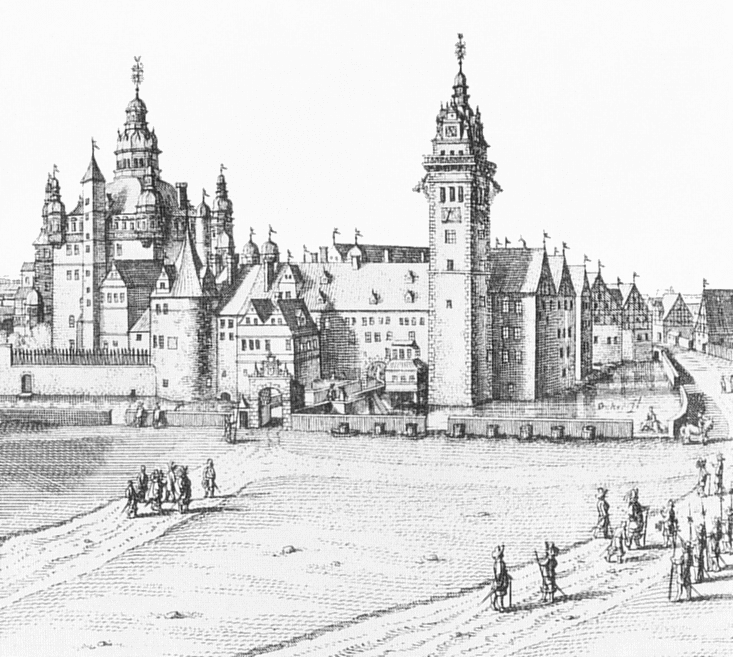
Engraving of Wolfenbüttel Castle in 1654

Critical for Österreich's career was his lifelong friendship with Johann Theile. When the arts-lover Anton Ulrich was appointed co-regent of the Duchy of Brunswick-Wolfenbüttel and made funds available for the fine arts, it was Theile who attached Österreich to the Wolfenbüttel court, took him into his house, and gave him lessons in composition. Alongside this, Österreich continued his voice studies with two Italian castrati who were also at the court, Giuliano Giuliani and Vincentino Antonini. His time at Brunswick-Wolfenbüttel was a formative period in every respect and marked the beginning of his activity as a composer. His first works date from the years 1687 and 1688. These three religious concertos, "Laetatus sum in his," "Levavi oculos meos," and "Ich will den Hern Loben allezeit" more strongly reflect the contrapuntal tradition of Johann Theile. His official duties at court were limited to participation as a tenor in the ducal choir and duties as a "Cammer-Diener", a page (servant) or valet. He had no official duties as a composer, though his works of the time were almost certainly performed in the court church.

In Wolfenbüttel, he married Magdalena Darnedden, the daughter of a brewer, on 15 October 1689, shortly before his move to Schleswig. His father-in-law, Hans Darnedden, was successful and respected and left the couple a house, a garden, and a considerable sum of money at his death in 1702.

=== Schleswig (1689–1702) ===
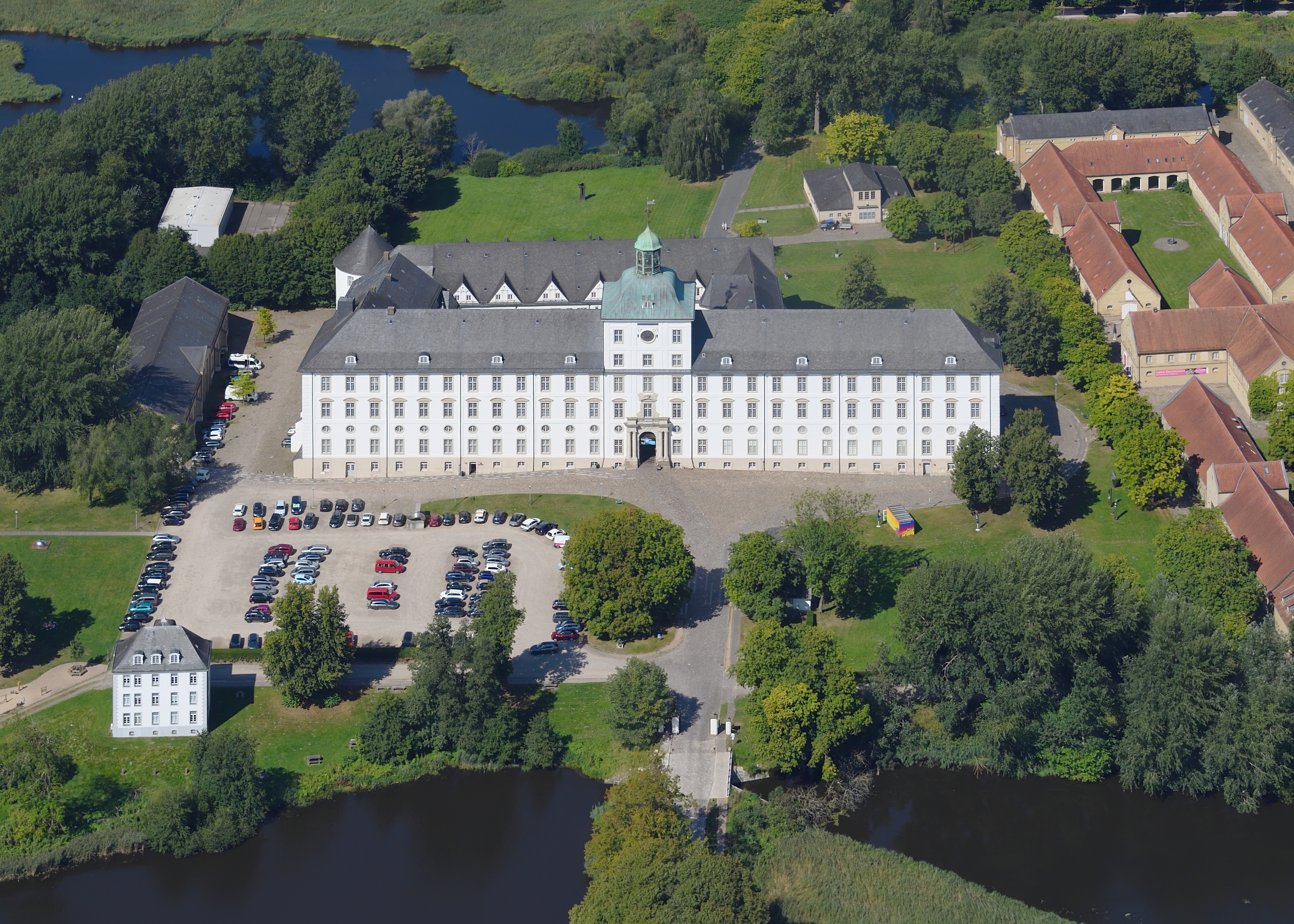
Gottorf Castle, where Österreich worked from 1689 to 1702

At the end of the 17th century, the Duchy of Holstein-Gottorp was in an extremely unstable political situation. Several times, the dukes had been forced out of their residence in Schleswig into exile in Hamburg. These exiles generally led to a large reduction, if not the dissolution of the court's musical ensemble. In 1689, Duke Christian Albrecht had been in exile in Hamburg for years when King Christian V of Denmark and Norway was forced by Charles VI, Holy Roman Emperor to sign the so-called "Altonaer Vergleich" (Altona Compromise) which permitted Christian Albrecht to return to Schleswig. Johann Philipp Förtsch had officially been the Duke's Kapellmeister (music director) since 1680 but had probably only sporadically performed any duties related to this office because of the exile. In the meantime, he had begun pursuing a medical career and was already serving as a court physician for his employer and did not intend to resume his activity as Kapellmeister. With the return of the court to Schleswig, however, it became necessary to find a capable person to fill the position. Förtsch, who had worked with Theile and Österreich for a time at the Hamburger Oper, suggested Österreich for this post. Österreich led his first performance as the Gottorfer Hofkapellmeister not later than the Advent season of 1689. During his tenure, the Gottorfer court ensemble became one of the most important in the German-speaking world.

==== Interval in Coburg ====
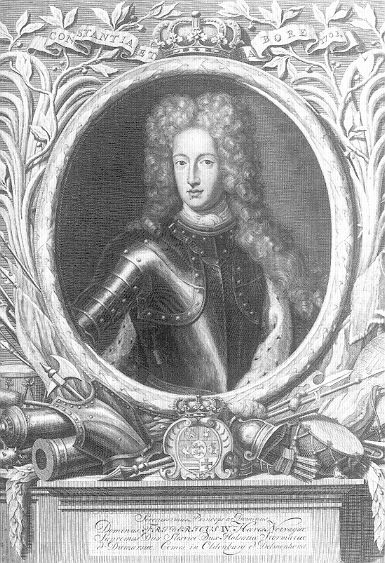
Engraving of Duke Frederick IV of Holstein-Gottorp from 1703

The surviving works of the Gottorfer Court Ensemble testify to a high level of musical performance. However, the period of flourishing was cut short when Christian Albrecht died on 27 December 1694. His son, Frederick IV, Duke of Holstein-Gottorp, then 23 years old, soon began dismissing members of the ensemble in order to increase his military expenditures. As a result, the courtly music was disrupted and Österreich assumed a position as Kapellmeister in Coburg from 1695 to 1697. The exact details of this position are not entirely known. It is possible it was merely a "loan" of his services for the time that the Gottorfer Court Ensemble was dormant since the Gottorfer accounts reflect salary payments of 80 reichsthaler during that period - a fraction of his full salary which had been 350 reichsthaler in 1694. Musical historian Johann Gottfried Walther described it somewhat differently in 1732; according to Walther, Albert V, Duke of Saxe-Coburg had invited Österreich to his Coburg residence and commissioned some of his work "to be used at festivities of the time." The Duke was so enthusiastic about Österreich that he invited him to stay to replace his recently deceased court Kapellmeister.

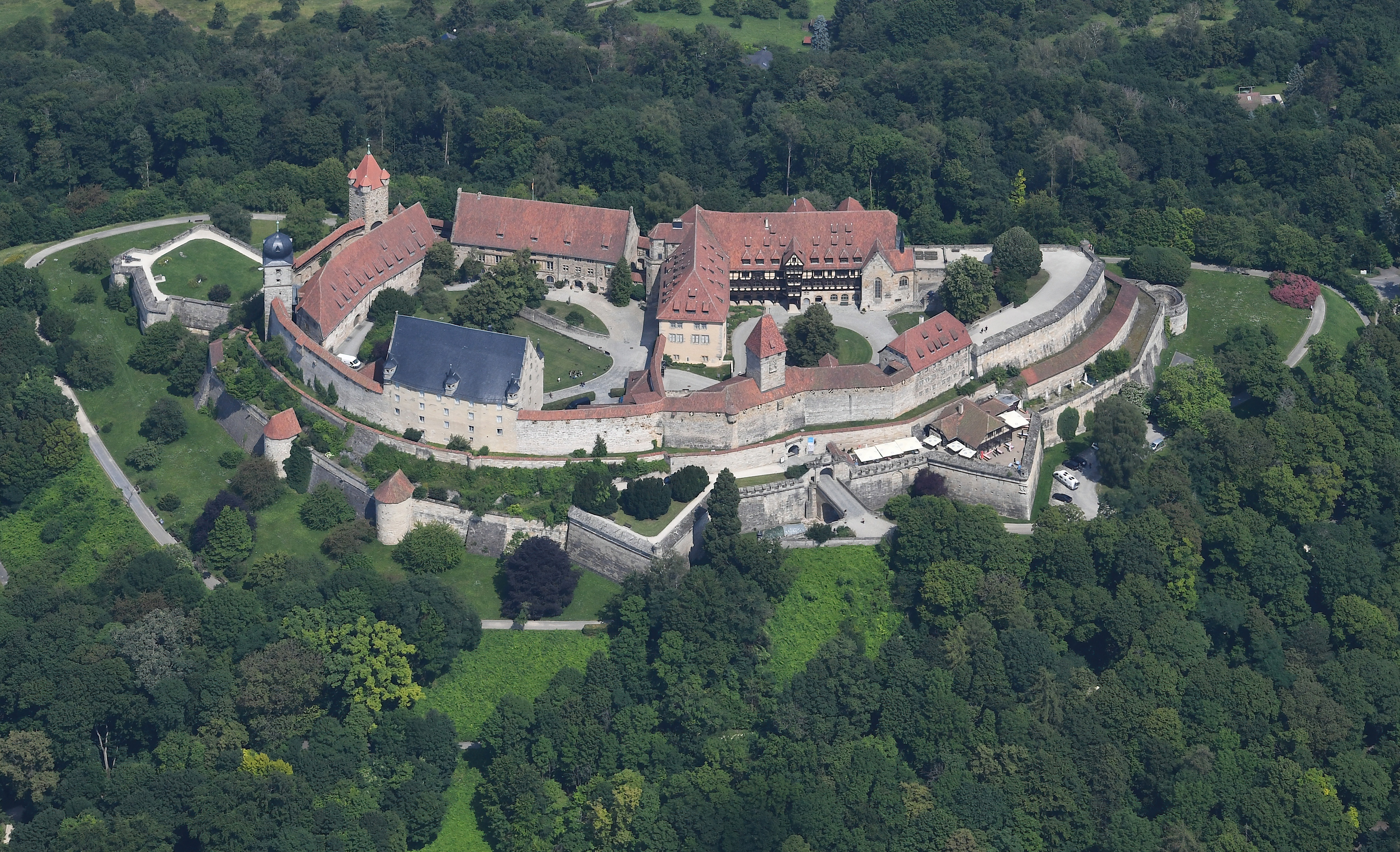
Veste Coburg, the former seat of the Dukes of Saxe-Coburg

Whether by a temporary appointment or an invitation from the Duke of Saxe-Coburg, Österreich desired to remain in Coburg on account of the relatively stable political situation. Frederick IV, however, did not want to lose Österreich permanently and promised that if he would return to his old position in Schleswig, he would reverse the cutbacks to the court's music budget. It is not clear whether the Duke kept his promise. Some documents from the period 1698 to 1702 reference the court ensemble and works from the time would require a considerable number of performers. However, court accounts reflect salaries only for the Kapellmeister and one organist, though it may be the case that non-resident musicians were used for larger performances and were paid by the project.

==== Decline of the Gottorfer Court Ensemble ====
In 1701, when Frederick IV set off to the east to serve at the side of his brother-in-law Karl XII of Sweden in the Northern War, the court at Schleswig was dissolved once again. Only Österreich retained his position, though the duke permitted him to leave and make his living by music elsewhere as long as he returned and resumed his duties as soon as the court was reconstituted. In the meantime, Österreich had inherited a brewery in Brunswick from his father-in-law where he moved with his family in 1702. But in December of that year, he had to resume his duties in Gottorf for Frederick IV's burial after he was killed in the Battle of Klissow.

=== Brunswick Wolfenbüttel (1702–1735) ===
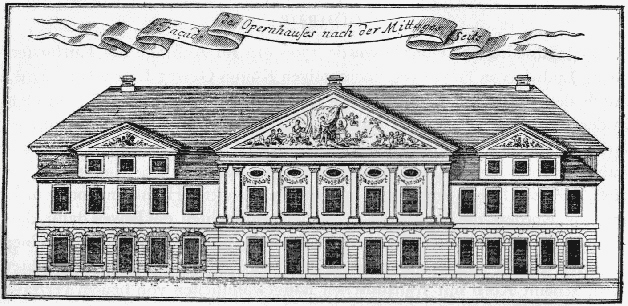
1747 Etching of the Brunswick Opera House

It is difficult to reconstruct Österreich's employment after he moved to Brunswick. Initially, he and his family probably lived off of the inheritance from his father-in-law and the income from the brewery. However, as a 1704 letter shows, these savings began to run short and Österreich would have needed to find a new position even if he had not been dismissed from service in Gottorf. One biographer writes that he participated in the church music and took over as cantor of the castle church but his position as castle cantor can only be confirmed from 1724, though it cannot be ruled out that he held the position earlier. It is certainly the case that Österreich was participating in opera performances at the Theater am Hagenmarkt in Brunswick by at least 1708, when he was named in connection with a staging of Georg Caspar Schürmann's "Der erfreuten Ocker Schäfer eingestelltes Fest," though he was likely involved earlier than that. The opera was founded by Anthony Ulrich, Duke of Brunswick-Wolfenbüttel in 1690 and staged productions twice a year during the local fairs. Österreich continued to work in connection with the opera until at least 1721.

In Brunswick Wolfenbüttel, Österreich came into contact with the modern musical currents of the age. In the late 17th century, the French style of Kapellmeister Johann Sigismund Kusser was the fashion. However, at the beginning of the 18th century, a dramatic shift took place when, in 1701, the Duke sent Schürmann to study in Italy to adapt to the new musical tastes. Österreich was not unaffected by these changes. He also changed his musical vocabulary drastically. Unfortunately, few works from this transitional period (1704-1719) survive, so the development of his style can only be partially reconstructed.

In addition to his duties as singer, cantor, and singing instructor, Österreich also taught composition, passing on what he had learned from Johann Theile, above all regarding counterpoint. His most important student was Heinrich Bokemeyer who was Cantor at the princely Schule zu Wolfenbüttel and from 1739 was a member of Lorenz Christoph Mizler's Corresponding Society of Musical Sciences. How long Bokemeyer was Österreich's student is not known (the documents state "around 1706") but they developed a close friendship. In the 1720s, Österreich successively sold Bokemeyer the music collection, primarily church music, that he had established in Gottorf. Bokemeyer added to the collection with mainly secular works from contemporary composers. At least half of the collection survives today and is maintained by the Berlin State Library. It includes currently 1,839 titles, which are primarily scores. Most musicologists call it the "Bokemeyer Collection" though 1,702 of the works go back to the Gottorf collection, rendering the name somewhat misleading.

It is written in various places that Österreich held the position of vice-Kapellmeister in Wolfenbüttel. However, this cannot be confirmed in surviving contemporary documents, as many archives of the time were lost or destroyed during the world wars. In any event, it appears that at the very least he held such a position in a de facto form, even if he was never formally appointed.

By the end of the 1720s, in his mid-sixties, Österreich was gradually withdrawing from the musical events in Brunswick-Wolfenbüttel, likely not least due to the growing popularity of Italian composers and the changes in fashionable tastes. On 9 May 1735, Georg Caspar Schürmann was sent into retirement by the new Duke, Ferdinand Albert II, who found his style too old-fashioned. Österreich was supposed to remain in his position as court cantor, but died a few weeks later. His death is recorded in the court's church register for 6 June 1735: "in the evening at 10 o'clock, after a short illness, died gently and peacefully, and was buried on the 10th."

== Children ==
Österreich had four children with his wife Magdalena:

- Johann Samuel (25 May 1691 – 27 May 1712)
- Anton August (19 December 1692 – 1745)
- Georg Christoph (5 November 1694 – 1762)
- Sophie Amalie (20 June 1696 – ?)

The social standing which he attained in his position as court Kapellmeister is apparent in the list of his children's godparents. Among them are found such prominent names as Anthony Ulrich, Duke of Brunswick-Wolfenbüttel; crown prince and later duke Augustus William of Brunswick-Lüneburg; and Augustus William's second wife, Sophie Amalie, born Duchess of Holstein-Gottorf, in addition to Österreich's predecessor and teacher Johann Theile.

Österreich's sons all pursued careers in the church and held high ecclesiastical offices in northern Germany. Only his daughter, Sophie Amalie, devoted herself to music and became a celebrated opera singer at the Brunswick Theater.

== Biographical sources ==
Österreich's family tree was reconstructed in the 20th century. His last known direct descendant was the wife of a major general in the German Army who lived in Blankenburg (Harz). She died childless in the 1950s. In the possession of the family were several letters of Österreich's along with a handwritten autobiography in his own hand. A student at the time, Adam Soltys, was writing his dissertation on Österreich in 1922. This document came to his attention and he cited it several times in his work. Despite intensive searches, the present whereabouts of the manuscript have not been ascertained. The only reliable sources of information about Österreich's life are letters and the records of the courts where he was employed. The state archive in Schleswig maintains many valuable documents from Österreich's time in Gottorf, while a majority of the archive of Brunswick-Wolfenbūttel was lost in World War II.

Another important biographical source is the article on Österreich in Johann Gottfried Walther's Musicalisches Lexicon from 1732. Based on the detail in the article, it can be assumed that he received his information from Österreich himself. It is possible Österreich wrote his biography specially for Walther and accordingly some statements, particularly those regarding his motives for his various changes of employment must be treated with caution.

== Reputation ==
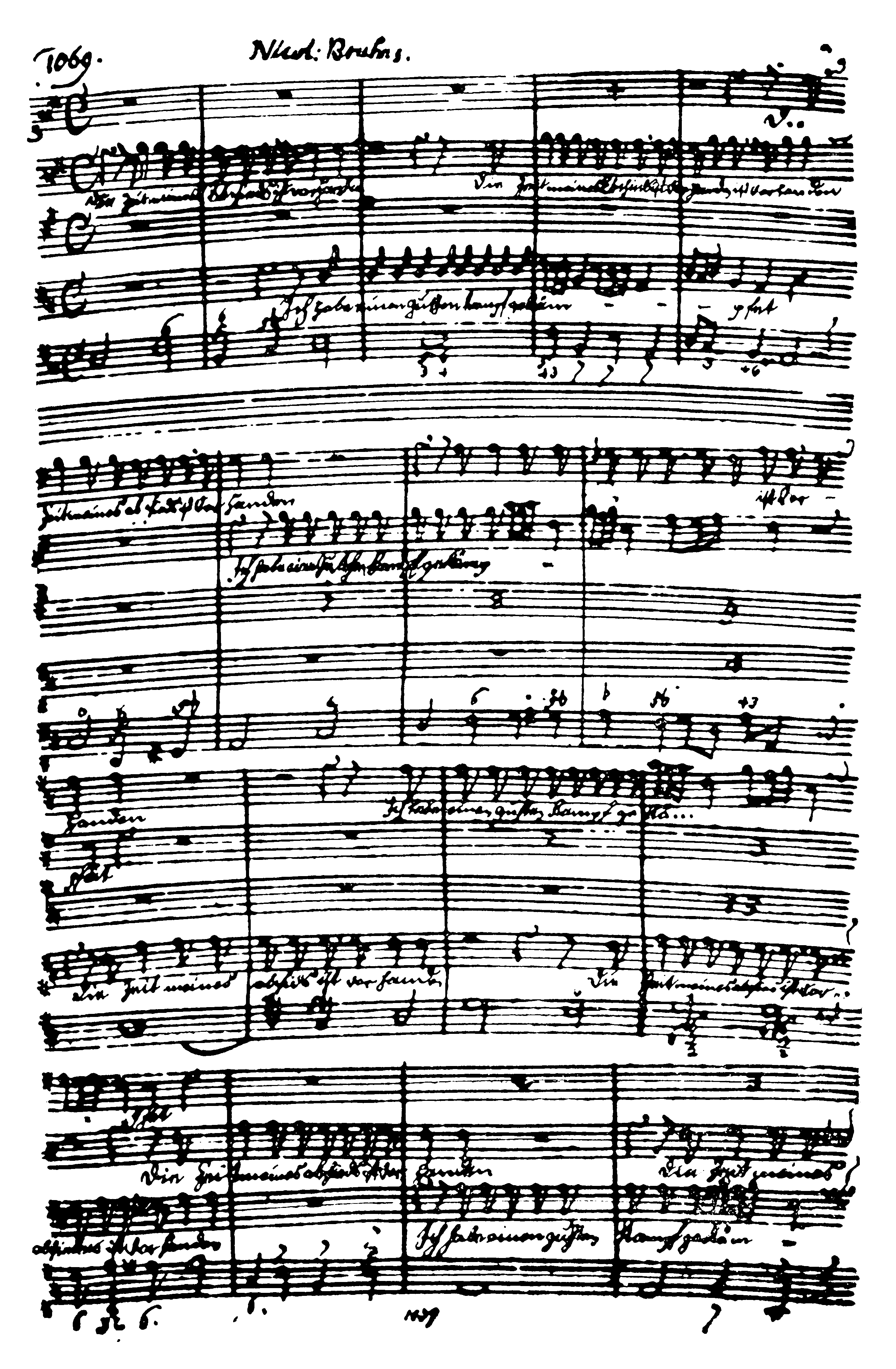
Georg Österreichs handwritten score of Nicolaus Bruhns’ cantata Die Zeit meines Abschieds ist vorhanden

Harald Kümmerling, a musicologist who has researched and catalogued the Bokemeyer collection, writing in the musical encyclopedia Die Musik in Geschichte und Gegenwart, was critical of Österreich's work, saying "Österreich, like, Gustaf Düben was a great collector but a sterile composer."

It is true, Düben's and Österreich's passion for collecting – Düben in Sweden and Österreich in Gottorf and Brunswick-Wolfenbüttel – is almost unique in the history of music. These great musical libraries are of enormous value, providing unique insight into the musical practice of the late 17th and early 18th centuries. Thanks to his collection, the works of famous composers like Dietrich Buxtehude, Nicolaus Bruhns, Johann Rosenmüller, Matthias Weckmann, Vincent Lübeck, and Johann Philipp Krieger, among others have been preserved.

For Österreich, counterpoint and canon were concrete manifestations of the "order of God" (Ordnung Gottes), their elaboration revealing the divine, inscrutable essence of God's creation, not merely as a metaphor for His order, but as the concrete actualization of that order. Österreich was certainly not a particularly innovative composer but he understood his work very well and was held in high regard during his lifetime.
