= Johann Matthias Gesner =

German classical scholar and schoolmaster (1691–1761)

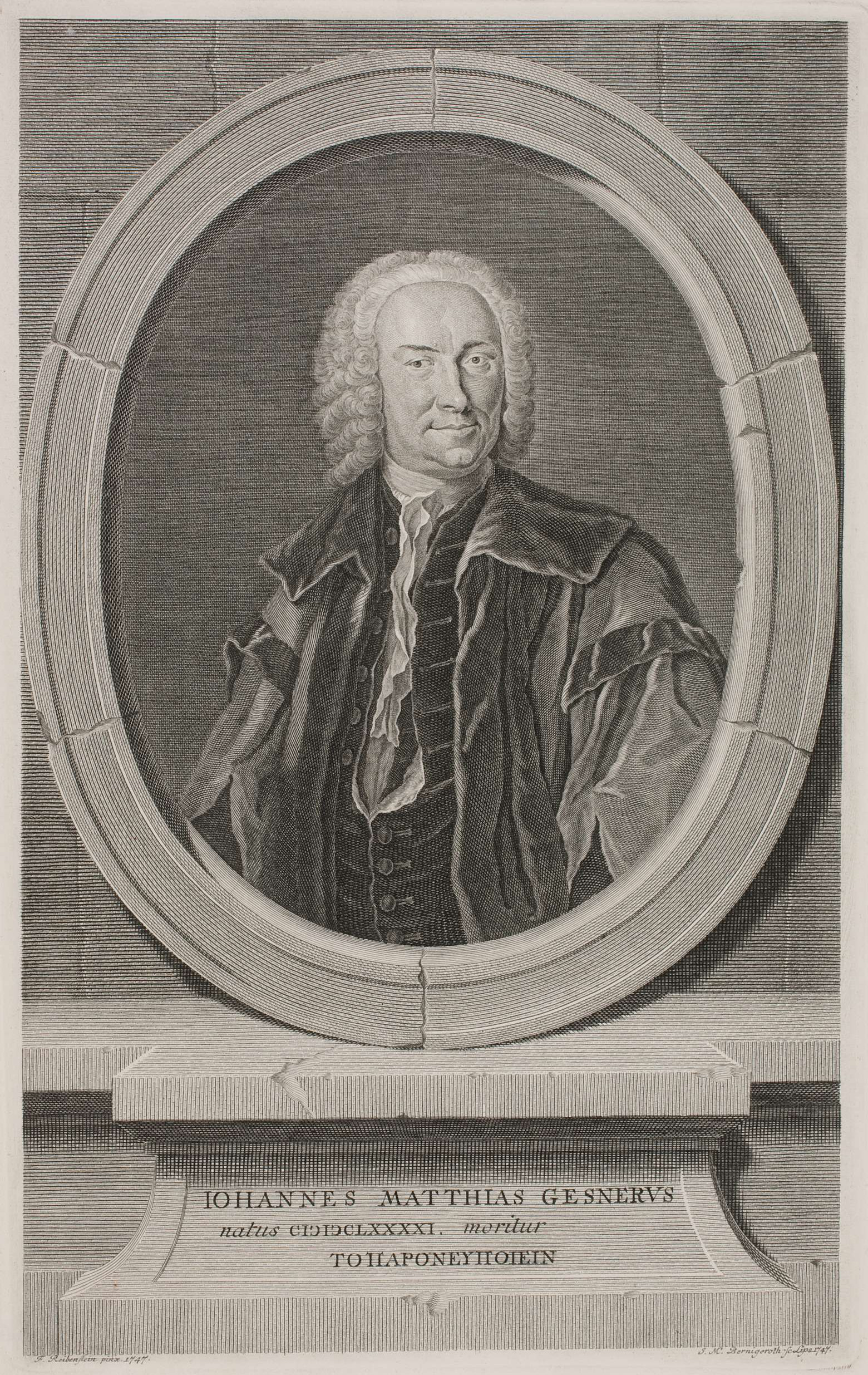
Frontispiece of Gesner's Novus Linguae et Eruditionis Romanae Thesaurus, 1747.

Johann Matthias Gesner (9 April 1691 – 3 August 1761) was a German classical scholar and schoolmaster.

== Life ==
He was born at Roth an der Rednitz near Ansbach in the Principality of Ansbach. His father, Johann Samuel Gesner, a pastor in Auhausen, died in 1704, leaving the family in straitened circumstances. Gesner's mother, Maria Magdalena (born Hußwedel), remarried, and Johann Matthias's stepfather, Johann Zuckermantel, proved supportive.

Noticing the boy's gifts, Zuckermantel prepared him for the Ansbach Gymnasium. As the costs of the school surpassed the family's means, the boy was supported by public resources and spent his school years in a dwelling for poor students. He was given special attention and instruction by the rector of the Gymnasium, Georg Nikolaus Köhler, who sparked his interest in languages, loaned him Greek texts, and devised special exercises in which the boy had to reconstruct intelligible texts from fragments. Gesner later recalled his Gymnasium years the most pleasant in his life.

He went on to study metaphysics, Semitic languages, and classical literature as a theology student at the University of Jena, working under Johann Franz Buddeus, who befriended Gesner and allowed the student to live in his own house. Despite Buddeus's support, however, he was passed over for a position in Jena. In 1714, he published a work on Philopatris (ascribed to Lucian).

In 1715, he became librarian and vice-principal at Weimar, where he became good friends with Johann Sebastian Bach (Bach later dedicated his Canon a 2 perpetuus BWV 1075 to Gesner), in 1729 (having been dismissed as librarian at Weimar) rector of the gymnasium at Ansbach, and in 1730 rector of the Thomasschule at Leipzig. The faculty at the University of Leipzig refused Gesner teaching privileges, however.

At the University of Göttingen he became Professor of Poetry and Eloquence (1734) and subsequently librarian, continuing to publish works on classical languages and literature as well composing Latin poetry and publicizing the university. Having probably become familiar with a similar organization in Leipzig, in 1738 he founded the Deutsche Gesellschaft, devoted to the advancement of German literature. He died at Göttingen.

Baumgarten, in his Aesthetics (1750), quoted passages from writers such as Horace, Virgil, Catullus, Juvenalis, and Cicero. According to Lessing, many of those passages were taken from Gesner’s Novus Linguae et Eruditionis Romanae Thesaurus [New Thesaurus of the Roman Language and Learning] (1747).

Gesner won a wide reputation as a reformer, a scholar, and a humanist.

== Works ==
- an edition of Basilius Faber's Thesaurus eruditionis scholasticae (1726), afterwards continued under the title Novus linguae et eruditionis Romanae thesaurus (1749)
- Opuscula minora varii argumenti (1743—1745)
- De corporum motu et viribus (in Latin). Zürich: David Gessner. 1746.
- Index etymologicus latinitatis (1749)
- Primæ lineæ isagoges in eruditionem universalem (1756)
- Thesaurus epistolicus Gesnerianus (ed. Klotz, 1768—1770)
- editions of the Scriptores rei rusticae, of Quintilian, Claudian, Pliny the Younger, Horace and the Orphic poems (published after his death)

== Sources ==
- JA Ernesti, Opuscula oratoria (1762), p. 305
- H Sauppe, Göttinger Professoren (1872)
- CH Pöhnert, J.M. Gesner und sein Verhaltnis zum Philanthropinismus und Neuhumanismus (1898), a contribution to the history of pedagogy in the 18th century
- articles by FA Eckstein in Allgemeine deutsche Biographie ix
