= Georg Fabricius =

German Renaissance poet, historian and archaeologist

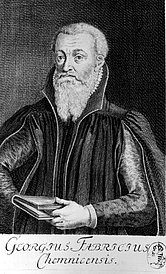
- Portrait of Georg Fabricus
- Born: 23 April 1516 Chemnitz, Holy Roman Empire
- Died: 17 July 1571 (aged 55) Meissen, Germany

Georg Fabricius (Latin: Georgius Fabricius Chemnicensis; 23 April 1516 – 17 July 1571) was a Protestant German poet, historian and archaeologist who wrote in Latin during the German Renaissance.

== Life ==
Fabricius was born as Georg Goldschmidt in Chemnitz in Saxony on 23 April 1516. He was educated at the University of Leipzig. In 1546 he was appointed rector of Saint Afra in Meissen.

Travelling in Italy with one of his pupils, he made an exhaustive study of the antiquities of Rome. In 1549 Fabricius edited the first short selection of Roman inscriptions focusing specifically on legal texts. This was a key moment in the history of classical epigraphy: for the first time in print a humanist explicitly demonstrated the value of such archaeological remains for the discipline of law, and implicitly accorded texts inscribed in stone as authoritative a status as those recorded in manuscripts. He published fuller results in his Roma, in which the correspondence between every discoverable relic of the old city and the references to them in ancient literature was traced in detail. In his sacred poems he affected to avoid every word with the slightest savour of paganism; and he blamed the poets for their allusions to pagan divinities.

He encouraged music at his school, although he was not himself a musician. Some of his writings were set to music by composers such as Martin Agricola, Johann Walter, Mattheus Le Maistre, Antonio Scandello, Johann Reusch and Wolfgang Figulus.

Fabricius died at Meissen on 17 July 1571.

== Works ==
Fabricius was a prolific author. Editions of Fabricius's own works include:

- Odarum Libri Tres ad Deum Omnipotentem (in Latin), ex officina Ioannis Oporini, 1552, Wittenberg 1545, Basel 1552.
- De Syntaxi Partium Orationis apud Graecos Liber Emendatior et Auctior (in Latin), Strasburg 1546, 1551, Köln 1561, 1564, Leipzig 1560.
- Itinerum Liber Unus (in Latin), Leipzig 1547, Basel 1550.
- Elegantiarum Puerilium ex M. Tullii Ciceronis Epistolis Libri Tres (in Latin), Leipzig 1548, 1563, 1565, 1572, 1575, 1576, 1582, Köln 1555, 1562, 1565, Dortmund 1565, Nürnberg 1556.
- Antiquitatum Libri II (in Latin), Basel 1549, 1560 (Johannes Oporinus).
- Antiquitatis Aliquot Monumenta Insignia ex Aere, Marmoribus Membranisque Veteribus (in Latin), 1549, Strasburg 1549.
- Elegantiarum Poeticarum ex Ovidio, Tibullo, Propertio... Libri Duo (in Latin), Leipzig 1549, 1560, 1562, 1564, 1570, Köln 1573, Düsseldorf 1558.
- Roma (in Latin), 1551, Basel 1551.
- Epithalamiorum Liber Unus (in Latin), Leipzig 1551.
- Indicationes Multorum, quae ad Lectionem Fabularum Plauti Nonnihil Momenti Afferre Possint (in Latin), Leipzig 1553.
- De Historia et Meditatione Mortis Christi, quae in Noctis Dieique Tempus Distributa Est, Hymni Viginti Quatuor (in Latin), Leipzig 1552, Basel 1553.
- Victoriarum Coelestium Liber Unus (in Latin), Leipzig 1553.
- Iesu Christi in Cruce pro Humana Salute Pendentis Heptalogus (in Latin), Leipzig 1553.
- Elegantiarum ex Plauto et Terentio Libri Duo and Publii Mimorum et Sententiarum ex Poetis Antiquis Similium Liber Unus (in Latin), Leipzig 1554, 1560, 1571, 1589, Basel 1555.
- De Re Poetica Libri Quatuor (in Latin), Leipzig 1556, 1560.
- Poematum Sacrorum Libri Quindecim (in Latin), Basel 1560.
- Partitionum Grammaticarum, quae Tabulis Delineatae Sunt, Libri Tres (in Latin), Basel 1560.
- Poetarum Veterum Ecclesiasticorum Opera Christiana et Operum Reliquiae atque Fragmenta (in Latin), per Ioannem Oporinum, 1564, Basel 1562, 1564.
- Regum Asmonaeorum et Idumaeorum usque ad Devastationem Urbis, Virorum Illustrium seu Historiae Sacrae Libri Decem (in Latin), Leipzig 1564, 1571, 1572, 1580, 1582, 1590.
- Scholae Fabricianae Puerilis Libri Undecim (in Latin), Basel 1564.
- Paeanum Angelicorum Libri Tres (in Latin), Leipzig 1565.
- Antiquae Scholae Christianae Puerilis Libri Duo (in Latin), Basel 1565.
- Historiarum Sacrarum e Poetis Veteribus Christianis Libri Duo (in Latin), Leipzig 1566.
- De Re Poetica Libri Septem (in Latin), Leipzig 1566, 1571, 1578, 1580, 1584, 1589.
- Poematum Sacrorum Libri Viginti Quinque (in Latin), Basel 1567.
- In Paeanas Tres, Prudentii, Sedulii, Fortunati, de Vita et Morte Christi, in Hymnos Tres Alios Prudentii et in Romanum Martyrem Expositio (in Latin), Leipzig 1568.
- Rerum Misnicarum Libri Septem and Annalium Urbis Misnae Libri Tres (in Latin), Leipzig 1569, Jena 1598.
- Grammaticorum Veterum Libelli de Proprietate et Differentiis Sermonis Latini (in Latin), Leipzig 1569.
- Gerichts Ordenung der Stadt Meissen (in German), Dresden 1570.
- Fewer Ordenung der Stadt Meissen (in German), Dresden 1570.
- Epitomes Prosodiae et Elegantiarum Poeticarum Liber (in Latin), Leipzig 1574, 1580, 1582.
- Commentarius in Genesin Brevis, Eruditus et Valde Utilis (in Latin), Leipzig 1584, Strasburg 1584.
- Originum Illustrissimae Stirpis Saxonicae Libri Septem (in Latin), typis Tobiae Steinmanni, impensis Henningi Grosii biblipolae Lipsensis, 1597, Leipzig 1597, posthumous.
- Rerum Germaniae Magnae et Saxoniae Universae Memorabilium Mirabiliumque Volumina Duo (in Latin), Leipzig 1609, posthumous.

He also produced editions of the following works with his own commentaries:

- Vergil. Leipzig 1548, 1551, 1553, Basel 1561.
- Terence. Strasburg 1549.
- Seneca's Tragödien. Leipzig 1566.
- Horace. Leipzig 1571.
- Ovid. Köln 1576.

His letters have also been posthumously published. His "In Praise of Georgius Agricola" includes the quote "Death comes to all but great achievements raise a monument which shall endure until the sun grows old."

== Legacy ==
A life of Georg Fabricius was published in 1839 by D. K. W. Baumgarten-Crusius, who in 1845 also issued an edition of Fabricius's Epistolae ad W Meurerum et alios aequales with a short sketch De Vita Ge. Fabricius de gente Fabriciorum. See also F. Wachter in Ersch and Gruber's Allgemeine Encyclopädie.
