= Wolfgang Figulus =

Wolfgang Figulus (c. 1525 – c. 1591) was a German cantor, and a composer and teacher.

== Life ==
He was born in Naumburg, as is known since he added this to his name in his publications. From 1545 or 1546 he was a cantor in Lübben. He studied in Leipzig from 1547, then from 1549 to 1551 he was cantor at St Thomas in Leipzig, and also a music teacher at Leipzig University.

In 1551 he was appointed cantor and music teacher at the Princely School of St Afra in Meissen, by the rector Georg Fabricius. His publications date from this time.

Because of age and weakness, he retired in 1588, followed as cantor by Georg Schulze. His son-in-law Friedrich Birck is thought to have stood in for him in the teaching post, moving to Grimma in 1591 where he was cantor at the Princely School of St Augustine; so it is supposed that Figulus died in that year.

== Works ==
Figulus published masses, motets, hymns and songs, and teaching books. About 170 works are known, and more than 100 have survived. His works are included in famous anthologies of the 16th century, indicating that he was well known.
