= Moritz Hermann Eduard Meier =

German classical philologist

Moritz Hermann Eduard Meier (1 January 1796 – 5 December 1855) was a German classical philologist, born at Glogau.

== Biography ==
In 1820, at the age of 24, he became an extraordinary professor at the University of Greifswald. In 1825, he was named professor of classical philology at the University of Halle, where he remained until his death.

Friedrich August Wolf, and especially Wolf's famous pupil, August Boeckh, whose classic work on the public economy of Athens appeared in 1817, had a great influence on Meier. His own first important publication dealt with a question in the legal antiquities of Athens, Historia Juris Attici de Bonis Damnatorum, etc. (Berlin, 1819); but his greatest work was written in collaboration with G. F. Schömann, Der Attische Process (Berlin, 1824); and was crowned by the Berlin Royal Academy. This treatise, now revised by J. H. Lipsius (Berlin, 1883–87), remains the standard work on Athenian legal procedure.

Meier prepared an edition of Demosthenes' oration Against Meidias and published many papers regarding thinkers of ancient Greece, especially Andocides and Theophrastus; these were collected after his death in Opuscula (1861–63). While living at Halle an der Saale, however, he devoted much of his energy to editing the Halle Allgemeine Zeitung newspaper for many years, and co-editing the Allgemeine Encyclopädie der Wissenschaften und Künste from 1830 to 1855.

He died at Halle.
