= Deutsches Wörterbuch =

German language dictionary

The German Dictionary
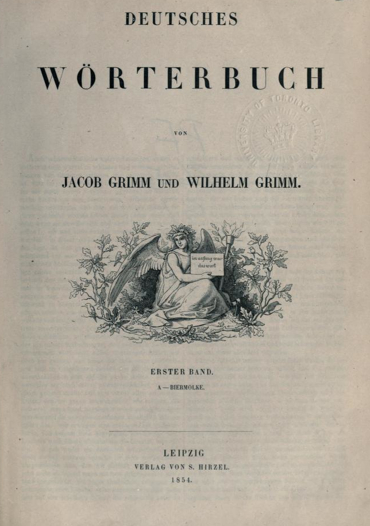
- The original title page of the Deutsches Wörterbuch, 1854
- Author: Brothers Grimm
- Original title: Deutsches Wörterbuch
- Language: German
- Subject: General
- Genre: Dictionary
- Publisher: Deutscher Taschenbuch Verlag
- Publication date: 1854 and on
- Publication place: Prussia; Germany
- Media type: 33 volumes (hardbound)
- ISBN: 978-3423590457
- Website: woerterbuchnetz.de, DWDS, DWDS (A–F, New Edition)

The Deutsches Wörterbuch (German: [ˌdɔʏtʃəs ˈvœʁtɐbuːx]; "German Dictionary"), abbreviated DWB, is the largest and most comprehensive dictionary of the German language. Encompassing modern High German vocabulary in use since 1450, it also includes loanwords adopted from other languages into German. Entries cover the etymology, meanings, attested forms, synonyms, usage peculiarities, and regional differences of words found throughout the German-speaking world. The dictionary's historical linguistics approach, illuminated by examples from primary source documents, makes it to German what the Oxford English Dictionary is to English. The first completed DWB lists over 330,000 headwords in 67,000 print columns spanning 32 volumes.

The Deutsches Wörterbuch was begun by the Brothers Grimm in 1838 and the initial volumes were published in 1854. Unfinished at the time of their deaths, the dictionary was finally completed by a succession of later scholars and institutions in 1961. In 1971, a 33rd supplement volume was published containing 25,000 additional entries. New research projects began in 2004 to expand and update the oldest parts of the dictionary to modern academic standards. Volumes A–F were planned for completion in 2012 by the Language Research Centre at the Berlin-Brandenburg Academy of Sciences and Humanities and the University of Göttingen.

== History ==
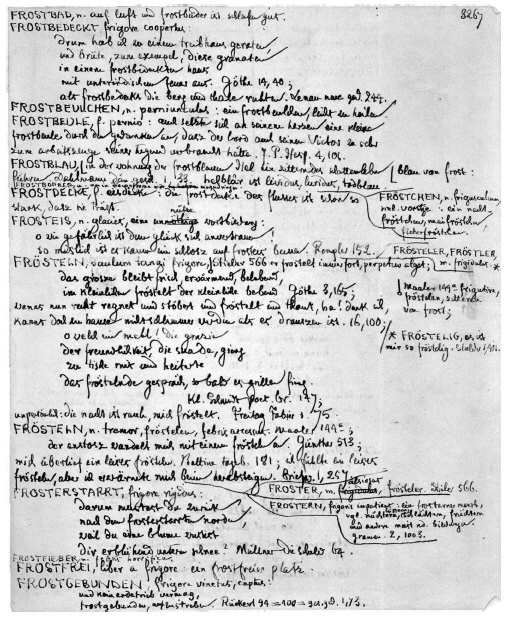
Original manuscript of the Deutsches Wörterbuch by Jacob Grimm

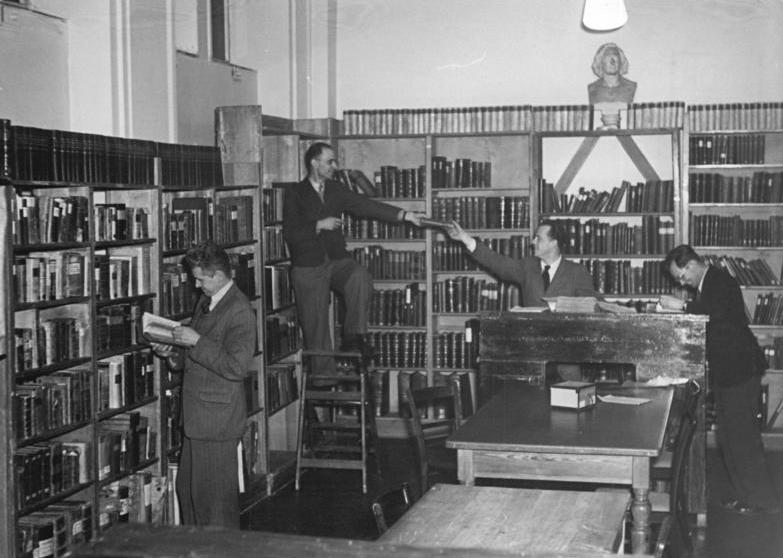
The Berlin Academy of Sciences staff working to complete the Grimm dictionary, 1952

=== Beginnings ===
Beginning in 1830, Weidmann's Publishing House in Leipzig repeatedly approached Jacob and Wilhelm Grimm with a proposal for a large new dictionary, spanning German vocabulary from Martin Luther to Johann Wolfgang von Goethe. As busy professors at Göttingen University, the Brothers Grimm rejected such a complex undertaking. A political scandal then dramatically changed matters. In 1837, the new King of Hanover, Ernst August, dissolved parliament and demanded oaths of allegiance from all civil servants. The brothers and five other professors refused and this so-called "Göttingen Seven" were removed from their positions by royal order. The brothers then became political refugees in their former home in Kassel.

=== The Grimms (1838–1863) ===
By October 1838, the Brothers had a contract with Weidmann's and the prestigious Leipzig journal Allgemeine Zeitung published an announcement of the start of work on the DWB. The brothers initially expected the project to take ten years and produce 6–7 volumes. Circumstances seemed favorable because they were provided with staff and spacious apartments in Berlin at the invitation of the Prussian Minister in 1841. However, difficulties soon began. Not only did the acquisition of source excerpts take much longer than expected, but illness and the Revolution of 1848 interrupted the work. Eight volumes consisting of 1824 printed columns, a bibliography and a detailed preface were finally published on 13 April 1854.

The first edition of the DWB exceeded the expectations of the brothers and the publishers. The press called it a "great national work" and its first shipments sold 10,000 copies. As it included words regarded as "indelicate," Jacob anticipated criticism of this and stated the following in the Foreword:

This dictionary is not an immoral book, but a scientific undertaking. Even the Bible does not lack for words that are frowned upon in fine society.

— Jacob Grimm, Vorwort 1. Band, S. XXXIV, Leipzig 1854

More volumes and updates were planned, but in their lifetime the brothers could only fully complete portions: Wilhelm Grimm wrote the articles to the letter D and died in 1859; Jacob, who was able to fully complete the letters A, B, C and E, died in 1863 while working on the entry for "Frucht" (fruit).

=== Post-Grimm era (1863–1907) ===
After the deaths of the Grimm Brothers, successive linguists continued the work. The first of these were close associates of the brothers, Rudolf Hildebrand and Karl Weigand. The DWB also became an affair of state when Otto von Bismarck requested the North German Confederation Federal Council to provide state funding in 1867. The young Germanist Moritz Heyne joined the project and became one of its most important contributors. By 1888 Heyne had invited graduate students to post articles under his supervision, turning the DWB into a true consortium for the first time. Included in this group was Rudolf Meißner who collaborated on the DWB for six decades (1889–1948). These ever-changing authors had different approaches and the work also proceeded very slowly. Hermann Wunderlich, Hildebrand's successor, only finished Gestüme to Gezwang after 20 years of work and 3000 columns of text. By 1905, academic professionals across Germany were unanimous: management of the DWB had to change or it would never be completed.

=== Academy of Sciences (1908–1961) ===
The prestigious Prussian Academy of Sciences took on formal development of the DWB in 1908 with Göttingen remaining a central collection point for source documents. Operations were streamlined and salaried workers were provided through funding by the Empire. This period of reform and consolidation ended with World War I in 1914. By the early '20s the project was again close to collapse as German hyperinflation drove costs of production to over 5 billion marks. A donation of just $152 from the United States in 1923 saved the DWB from ruin. Max Planck repeatedly advocated for the dictionary and funding was eventually taken up by the Emergency Association of German Science. Due to the efficiencies of a permanent staff of lexicographers as well as standardized policies for production, the period between 1931–1939 saw six times as much work completed as in the previous years. Nearly 100 years after its conception the DWB was permanently institutionalized and its conclusion was in sight.

World War II then paralyzed the work. Employees were drafted into military service, resources were scarce, and the archived holdings were moved to a potash mine at Bernburg an der Saale to protect them from Allied bombing. The remaining three employees continued some work at Schloss Fredersdorf outside Berlin. After the war the USSR granted permission to move the archived materials from Fredersdorf and Bernburg back to Berlin in 1947. The new German Academy of Sciences at Berlin then took on the work of the DWB. With the founding of East Germany in 1949, communication between Berlin and Göttingen became more difficult. Despite these political complications, the DWB was finally published in January 1961, 123 years after its beginnings. It totaled 67,744 text columns, 320,000 keywords and weighed 84 kg. A 1971 supplement contains 25,000 additional entries and references to primary sources.

== Later versions ==
Planning for a second edition had already begun in 1957, four years before the first edition was finished. The revision was intended especially to bring the oldest part of the Dictionary, the letters A–F originally authored by the Brothers Grimm, up to date. It also was to be a cooperative effort between East and West Germany: the Academy of Sciences of the GDR in East Berlin would complete A–C, and the University of Göttingen in the West would complete D–F. The initial fascicles of this revision were published in 1965, but it remains unfinished today, with the letters B and C (originally assigned to the Berlin team) still in progress. The East German Berlin team was greatly hindered for political reasons because the SED authorities saw the DWB as a "bourgeois" lexicography project. In the course of the 1960s, most of its staff were taken off the project and used for other tasks. In 1984, the original 1961 version of the DWB was published in a paperback edition, now out of print. In 1999 a new paperback printing of all 33 volumes (weight 30 kg), published by Deutscher Taschenbuch Verlag, became available (ISBN 978-3423590457).

== Digital edition ==
In 2004 the Competence Center for Electronic Text Processing and Publication in the Humanities at the University of Trier digitized the entire 300 million printed characters according to the method of double entry. The entire body was manually entered twice in China to eliminate error. A set of CD-ROMs of this digitization was released for Microsoft Windows, Linux and Mac OS. In this version spelling errors in the original were corrected. An online version of the first edition is also available at the University of Trier. The digitized first edition of the DWB met with lively interest. Every day the online version receives tens of thousands of hits and the CD-ROM of the first edition is now in its fourth updated distribution.

== New edition ==
In 2006 the unfinished project to revise and update the A–F volumes to modern academic standards was resumed. The conclusion of this work (the B and C volumes) was finished in 2016; fascicles are appearing with the S. Hirzel Verlag as they are completed.

However, the Berlin-Brandenburg Academy of Sciences and Humanities announced that no revision of the volumes G to Z is planned. According to the Academic Director of the Berlin-Brandenburg Academy, Wolf-Hagen Krauth, the sheer labor that would be required exceeds the possibilities for funding it in today's world.

== See also ==
- List of German dictionaries
  - Duden, a Standard German dictionary of the 1880s and the prescriptive source of German spelling
  - Österreichisches Wörterbuch, the official Austrian Standard German dictionary
- Die Brüder Grimm: Pioniere deutscher Sprachkultur des 21. Jahrhunderts. Herausgegeben von Jochen Bär ... [et al.]; [Texte und Redaktion: Bernhard Roll, Andrea Rocha-Lieder]. ISBN 9783577003056
- Digitales Wörterbuch der deutschen Sprache (DWDS). A continually updated online dictionary incorporating many other dictionaries, including the DWB itself, such as the WDG, WDW, and Wolfgang Pfeifer's Etymologische Wörterbuch des Deutschen, and more. The greater variety of sources makes the DWDS more widely used today compared to the DWS.
