= Bokemeyer collection =

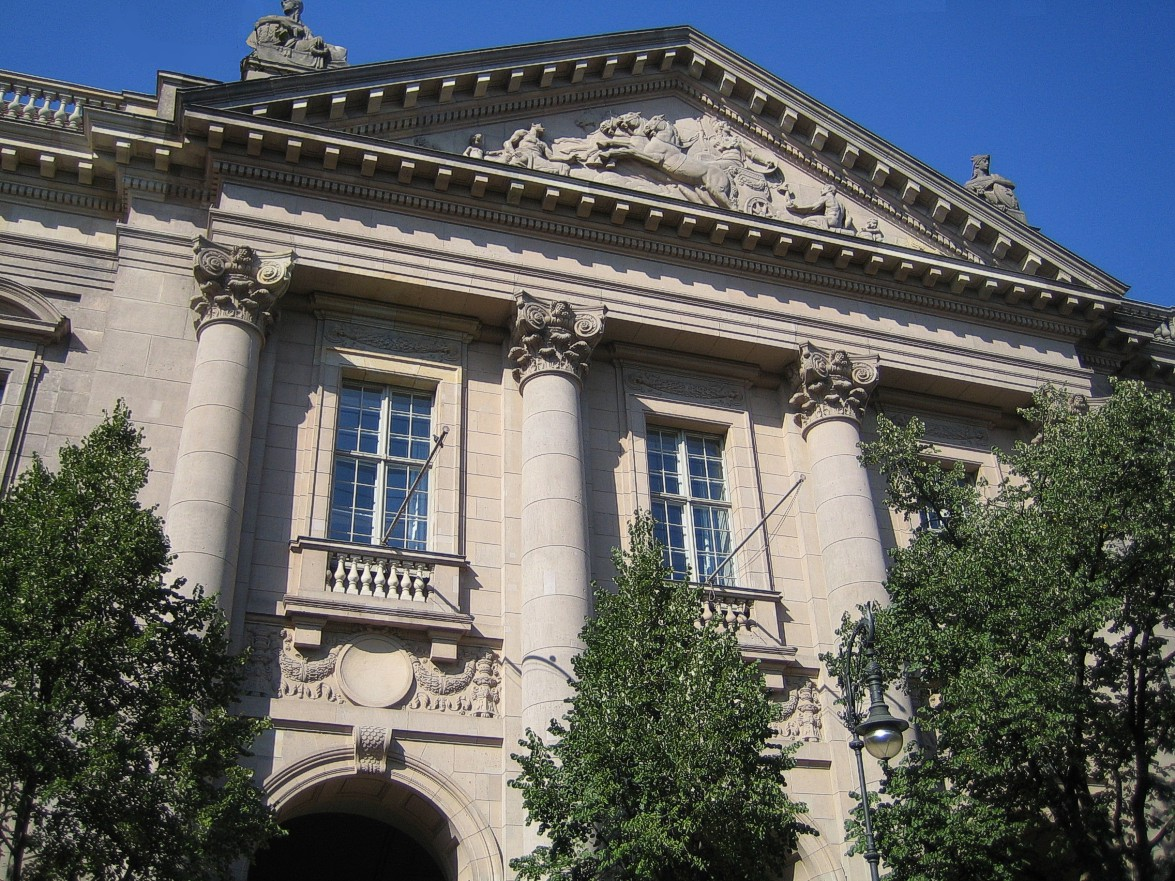
- Berlin State Library
- Housed at: Berlin State Library (Staatsbibliothek)

The Bokemeyer collection is a large music collection, which is housed in the Berlin State Library. It contains about 1,800 scores of music. It includes an important body of German Protestant vocal music.

The collection was primarily created by composer Georg Österreich. Subsequently, other collectors contributed, including Heinrich Bokemeyer (March 1679 – 7 November 1751), after whom it is now named. Bokemeyer was a cantor, poet and composer, in addition to being a collector.
