= Detlev Karl Wilhelm Baumgarten-Crusius =

German educator and philologist

Detlev Karl Wilhelm Baumgarten-Crusius (24 January 1786, Dresden – 5 May 1845, Meissen) was a German educator and philologist. He was the older brother of theologian Ludwig Friedrich Otto Baumgarten-Crusius (1788-1842).

From 1810, he served as a vice-principal in Merseburg, afterwards performing similar duties in Dresden (from 1817). In 1833 he was appointed rector at the "Landesschule" in Meissen, where he worked for the remainder of his career.

Baumgarten-Crusius is known for his work in the field of classical philology, in particular, editions of the Roman historian Suetonius. In 1822-24, he published an edition of Homer's Odyssey.

== Selected writings ==
- Clavis Suetoniana : triplicem continens indicem, 1818
- Homeri Odyssea, 1822-1824
- Eutropii Breviarium historiae romanae, 1824 (edition of Eutropius).
- C. Suetonii Tranquilli opera omnia, 1828
- C. Suetonii Tranquilli Duodecim Caesares, et minora quae supersunt opera, 1828
- Symbolae ad Lexica Graeca ex Aretaeo Cappadoce, scriptore medico, 1834.
