= Johann Gottfried Stallbaum =

German classical scholar (1793–1861)

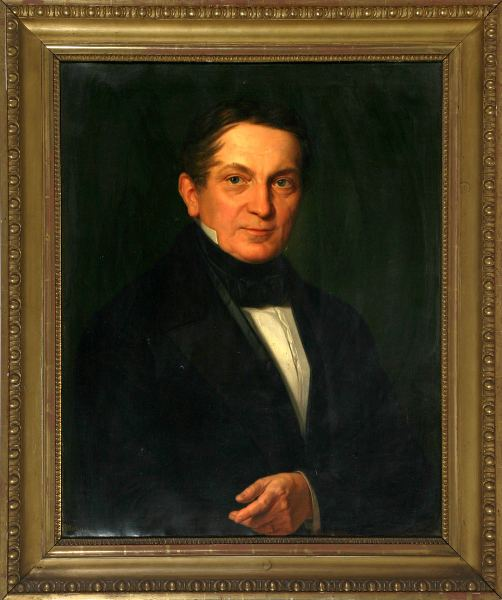
Johann Gottfried Stallbaum.

Johann Gottfried Stallbaum (September 25, 1793 - January 24, 1861), German classical scholar, was born at Zaasch, near Delitzsch in Saxony.

From 1820 until his death Stallbaum was connected with Thomasschule zu Leipzig, from 1835 as rector. In 1840 he was also appointed extraordinary professor in the university.

His reputation rests upon his work on Plato, of which he published two complete editions: the one (1821–1825) a revised text with critical apparatus, the other (1827–1860) containing exhaustive prolegomena and commentary written in excellent Latin, a fundamental contribution to Platonic exegesis.

A separate edition of the Parmenides (1839), with the commentary of Proclus, deserves mention. Stallbaum also edited the commentaries of Eustathius of Thessalonica on the Iliad and Odyssey, and the Grammaticae latinae institutiones of Thomas Ruddiman.

See Lipsius in the Osterprogramm of the Thomasschule (1861); R Hoche in Allgemeine Deutsche Biographie, volume xxxv.

== Selected works ==
=== Greek and Latin writers (editor) ===
- Platonis Philebus. Leipzig, Hinrichs, 1820.
- Platonis quae supersunt omnia. 12 vols. Leipzig, Weigel, 1821–1825.
- Platonis Euthyphro. Leipzig, Hartmann, 1823.
- Herodoti Halicarnassei Historiarum libri IX. Leipzig, Weigel, 1824–1826.
- Platonis opera omnia (up to 1832 Platonis dialogos selectos...). 10 vols. (21 fascs.). Gotha, Hennings, 1827–1860.
- Desiderii Erasmi Roterodami Colloquia. Leipzig, Hinrichs, 1828.
- Platonis Meno. Leipzig, Hartmann, 1827.
- Platonis Parmenides. Leipzig, Lehnhold, 1839.

=== Other ===
- Die Thomasschule zu Leipzig nach dem allmäligen Entwicklungsgange ihrer Zustände insbesondere ihres Unterrichtswesens. Leipzig, Staritz, 1839.
- Über den inneren Zusammenhang musikalischer Bildung der Jugend mit dem Gesammtzwecke des Gymnasiums. Leipzig, Nagel, 1842.
- Das Griechische und Lateinische in unsern Gymnasien und seine wissenschaftliche Bedeutung für die Gegenwart. Eine Schulrede, begleitet von einigen Bemerkungen über reformatorische Bestrebungen unserer Zeit. Leipzig, Staritz, [1846].
