= Rudolf Hildebrand =

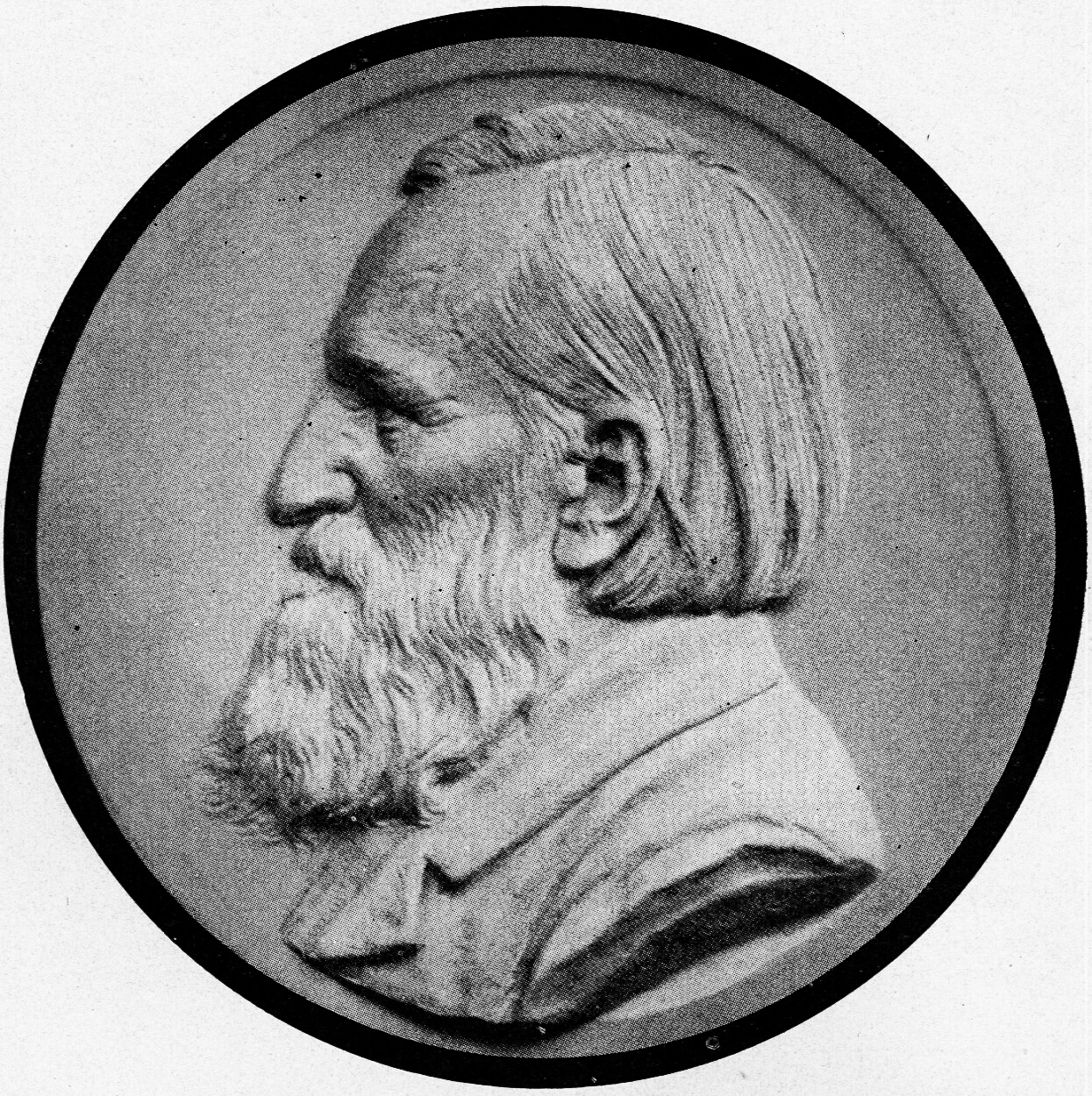
- Rudolf Hildebrand, grave relief by sculptor Carl Seffner
- Born: March 13, 1824; Leipzig
- Died: October 28, 1894 (aged 70)

Heinrich Rudolf Hildebrand (13 March 1824 – 28 October 1894) was a Germanist, contributor to, and then, editor of the Grimm brothers' Deutsches Wörterbuch. He also wrote on the history of German folksongs, and on the teaching of the German language in schools.

== Biography ==
Rudolf Hildebrand was born in Leipzig to typesetter Heinrich Hildebrand and Amalia, born Porges. He attended the Thomasschule in Leipzig from 1836 to 1843. He went on to study at Leipzig University, where he first studied theology as his father wished him to, but soon switched to classical and German philology. Among his teachers were Moritz Haupt. He wrote his main thesis about Walther von der Vogelweide, which was later published in 1900.

In 1848, he worked for a time as reviewer and translator of the Deutsche Allgemeine Zeitung and was considering a career as a publisher. However, the same year, he started working as a teacher at the Thomasschule from 1848 and remained there to 1868.

He became professor of newer German language and literature at the University of Leipzig in 1869 ("außerordentlicher Professor" from 1869, "ordentlicher Professor" from 1874).

== Selected works ==
- Deutsches Wörterbuch (contributor, editor), München 1854–1960.
- Vom deutschen Sprachunterricht in der Schule und von deutscher Erziehung und Bildung überhaupt, Leipzig 1879.
- Gesammelte Aufsätze und Vorträge zur deutschen Philologie und zum deutschen Unterricht, Leipzig 1890.
- Ueber Walter von der Vogelweide, edited by Georg Berlit, Leipzig 1900.
