= St. Thomas School, Leipzig =

St. Thomas School of Leipzig
- Thomasschule zu Leipzig
- Schola Thomana Lipsiensis

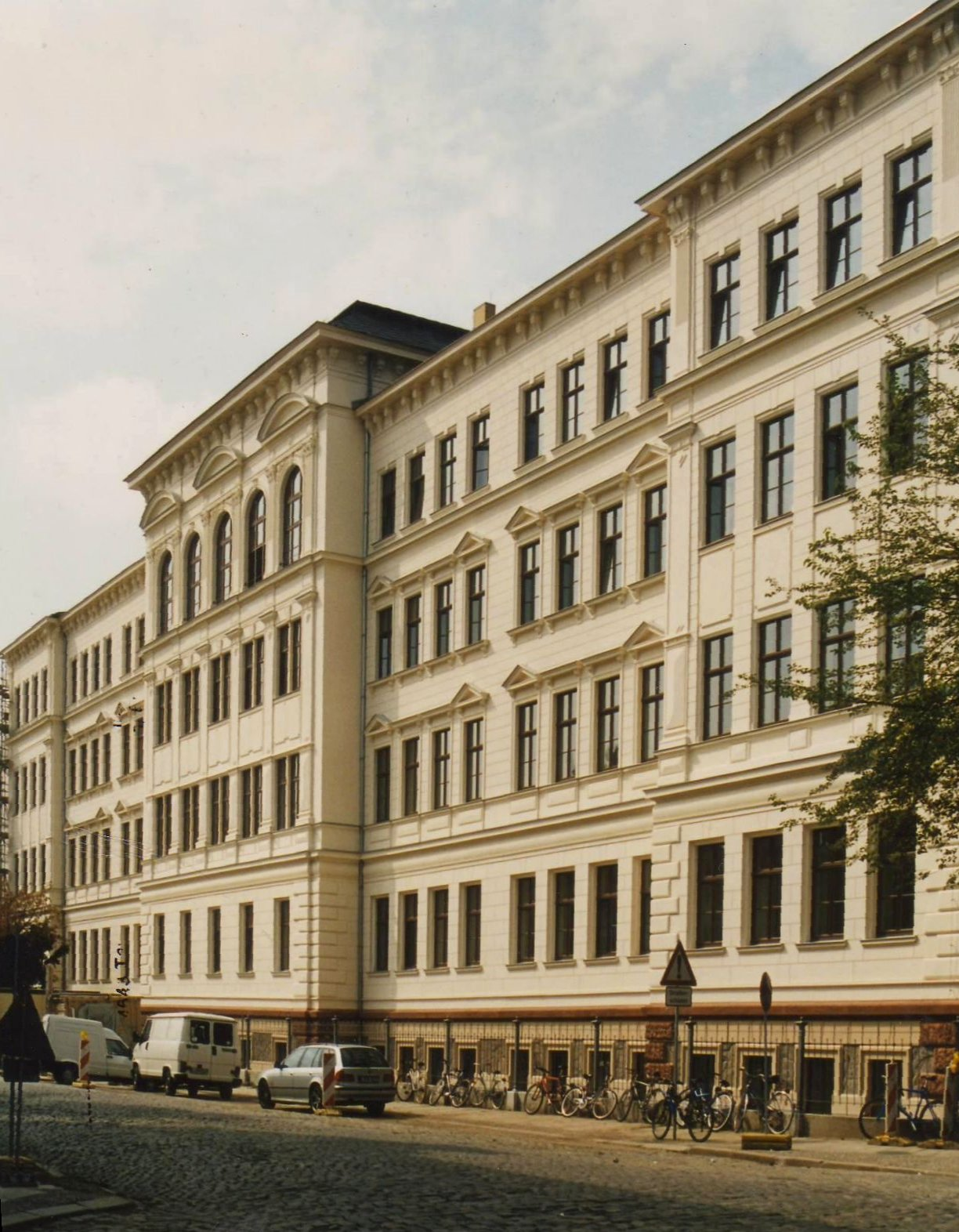

Location
- Hillerstraße 7; 04109 Leipzig; Saxony; Germany
- Coordinates: 51°20′13″N 12°21′36″E

Information
- Type: Public Boarding School
- Religious affiliations: Lutheran. (From 1212 to 1539 Catholic; Lutheran since the Protestant Reformation)
- Patron saint: Thomas the Apostle
- Established: 1212; 814 years ago
- Founder: Augustinians
- Superintendent: Burgomaster Prof. Dr. phil. Thomas Fabian (University of Applied Sciences), Alderman for Youth, Social, Health and School
- Principal: Michael Rietz
- Chaplain: Christian Wolff
- Staff: 70
- Grades: 5 to 12
- Gender: coed, Boys' choir
- Age: 10 to 18
- Enrollment: 700
- Classrooms: 37
- Campus: Forum Thomanum
- Campus type: Urban
- Colours: Green and white
- Newspaper: Kasten Journal
- Graduates (2007): 87
- Alumni: Old Thomaner
- Alumni: Thomanerbund
- Chair: Christoph M. Haufe
- Choir: Thomanerchor
- Cantor: Andreas Reize
- Website: thomasschule.de

St. Thomas School, Leipzig (German: Thomasschule zu Leipzig; Latin: Schola Thomana Lipsiensis) is a co-educational and public boarding school in Leipzig, Saxony, Germany. It was founded by the Augustinians in 1212 and is one of the oldest schools in the world.

St. Thomas is known for its art, language and music education. Johann Sebastian Bach held the position of Thomaskantor from 1723 until his death in 1750. His responsibilities included providing young musicians for church services in Leipzig. The Humanistic Gymnasium has a very long list of distinguished former students, including Richard Wagner (1813–1883) and many members of the Bach family, including Johann Sebastian Bach's son Carl Philipp Emanuel Bach (1714–1788).

From the 800-Year Anniversary Celebration in 2012 the Thomanerchor and St. Thomas School has been part of Forum Thomanum, an internationally oriented educational campus.

== History ==
St. Thomas School was founded in 1212 by Margrave Dietrich von Meißen (1162–1221) making it among the oldest schools in Europe. It was run as schola pauperum, meaning a free school intended to benefit the poor, by the Canons Regular of St. Augustine. The St. Thomas Church was founded with the school. The St. Thomas School is first mentioned in documents dating to 1254.

In 1539 the city of Leipzig took over ownership of the school. All members (Thomaner) of the boys choir (Thomanerchor) attend the school along with other pupils. The Thomaner live in the school's own boarding school, Thomasalumnat.

The school's first building was in the present courtyard of the St. Thomas Church. In 1553 an outbuilding was built there. During Johann Sebastian Bach's time as Thomaskantor these buildings were extended; in 1829 they were reconstructed. In 1877 a new building was erected in the Schreberstraße to meet a shortage of space. In 1881 a new building for the boarding school was finished.

The school was used as a barracks by a Freikorps unit during the Kapp Putsch. The staff had little sympathy for Friedrich Ebert's government.

During the Nazi era the school continued its normal curricula. The school endured the bombings of the night of 3 December 1943 with only the gym and the buildings across from the boarding school being destroyed. The then-rector, Günther Ramin, decided to move the choir boys to the Königlich Sächsische Fürsten- und Landesschule Sankt Augustin school in Grimma. Because of this, and because most of the older students were enlisted, the University of Leipzig was allowed to use the school's building for its own purposes. The rector's decision to move the choir boys was proved right during the bombings of 20 February 1944 when the school's buildings were destroyed. After that, the remaining pupils attended 41. Volksschule on the Hillerstraße. At some stage, the choir boys rejoined these pupils at Hillerstraße.

In 1973 the school moved into a new building in the Pestalozzistraße (now Telemannstraße), but the boarding school remained in the Hillerstraße. The new communist regime in East Germany tried to make an exemplar atheist school out of St. Thomas school, but the church's influence was immense.

After the German reunification in 1990 the pupil's numbers increased. Since 2008 the school offers its students mathematics, natural sciences, music, and linguistic courses.

In September 2000 the school moved into the restored original building on the Hillerstraße. In 2008, there were 485 pupils and 67 teachers. Prior to 1973, all the Thomaskantors were also teachers at the school and the president of the choir was also the school's rector. Since 1973 those roles have been separated.

== Foreign languages ==
Cultivating classical languages is an old tradition at St. Thomas School. All students study Latin as their first or second foreign language, including the Qualification in Latin (Latinum). Combined with the modern language English the pupils learn fundamental foreign language skills. Although there are offered advanced courses (Leistungskurse) in those subjects. Interested students are welcome to take the First Certificate in English (FCE). The tradition of the school and its roots in European culture are the motive for providing Ancient Greek classes from 8th grade as well as a Qualification in Greek (Graecum). Also St. Thomas offers Romance languages, like French and Italian.

Student exchange programs and stays in Europe and in Anglo-America are possible.

== Notable alumni ==
- Carl Friedrich Abel – German composer and fine player on the viola da gamba, pupil of Johann Sebastian Bach
- Franz Abt – German composer
- Nicolaus von Amsdorf – German theologian and Protestant reformer
- Johann August Apel – German writer and jurist
- Armand Léon von Ardenne – German military writer and general, character in Effi Briest
- Wilhelm Friedemann Bach – eldest son and pupil of Johann Sebastian Bach
- Carl Philipp Emanuel Bach – German musician and composer, second son of Johann Sebastian Bach
- Johann Christian Bach – composer of the Classical era, tenth son of Johann Sebastian Bach
- Johann Christoph Friedrich Bach – ninth son of Johann Sebastian Bach
- Johann Gottfried Bernhard Bach – fourth son of Johann Sebastian Bach
- Karl Baedeker – German physicist
- Fritz Beblo – German city planner, architect and painter
- Christian Daniel Beck – German philologist, historian, theologian and antiquarian
- Oskar Becker – German philosopher, logician and mathematician
- Roderich Benedix – German dramatist and librettist
- Theodor Bergk – German philologist
- Otto Julius Bierbaum – German writer
- Georg Christoph Biller – German choral conductor
- Christian Ludwig Boxberg – German composer and organist
- Albert Brockhaus – German publisher and politician
- Eduard Brücklmeier – German diplomat and resistance fighter against the Nazi régime
- Conrad Bursian – German philologist and archaeologist
- Johann Benedict Carpzov II – German Christian theologian and Hebraist
- Carl Gustav Carus – German physiologist and painter
- Julius Schnorr von Carolsfeld – German painter
- Walter Cramer – German businessman and a member of the failed July 20 Plot
- Karl Wilhelm Dindorf – German classical scholar
- Max Dieckmann – German physicist
- Christoph von Dohnányi – German conductor
- Klaus von Dohnanyi – German politician
- Georg Dohrn – German conductor
- Axel Eggebrecht – German journalist and writer
- Theodor Wilhelm Engelmann – German botanist, physiologist and microbiologist
- Georg Fabricius – German poet, historian and archaeologist
- Johann Friedrich Fasch – German composer
- Paul Fleming – German poet
- Arnold Gehlen – an influential conservative German philosopher and sociologist
- Reinhard Goerdeler – German accountant and founder of KPMG
- Johann Gottlieb Görner – German composer and organist, pupil of Johann Sebastian Bach
- Johann Christoph Graupner – German harpsichordist and composer of high Baroque music
- Andreas Gruentzig – German cardiologist
- Karl Heine – lawyer and a major entrepreneur and industrial pioneer
- Thomas Theodor Heine – German painter and illustrator
- Johann David Heinichen – German Baroque composer and music theorist, Kapellmeister to the Royal Polish and Electoral Saxon Court in Dresden
- Karl Heinrich Heydenreich – German philosopher and poet
- Rudolf Hildebrand – Germanist
- Karl von Hochmuth – Russian General
- Otto Hoetzsch – German academic and politician
- Reinhard Keiser – popular German opera composer, one time Kapellmeister of the Hamburg Opera and successor to Johann Mattheson as Cantor (church) of Hamburg Cathedral
- Johann Friedrich Kind – German dramatist
- Johann Ludwig Krebs – Rococo and Classical period musician and composer, pupil of Johann Sebastian Bach and son of Johann Tobias Krebs, another Bach pupil (during his tenure at Weimar)
- Sebastian Krumbiegel – German singer and musician
- Victor Lange – German-born US-American Germanist at Princeton University
- Gottfried Leibniz – German mathematician and philosopher
- Justus Hermann Lipsius – German classical scholar
- Christian Gustav Adolph Mayer – German mathematician
- Erhard Mauersberger – German choral conductor, 14th Cantor of the Thomaskirche zu Leipzig after Johann Sebastian Bach, brother of Rudolf Mauersberger (the composer, conductor, and Cantor of the Kreuzkirche Dresden)
- Felix Moscheles – English painter, peace activist and advocate of Esperanto
- Paul Julius Möbius – German neurologist
- Georg Österreich – German Baroque composer
- Carl Adam Petri – German mathematician and computer scientist
- Eduard Friedrich Poeppig – German botanist, zoologist and explorer
- Nikolaus Pevsner – German-born British scholar of history of art at Cambridge and Oxford University
- Johann Georg Pisendel – German Baroque musician, violinist and composer
- Die Prinzen – German music group
- Günther Ramin – influential German organist, conductor, composer, pedagogue, and 12th Thomaskantor after Bach
- Carl Gottlieb Reissiger – German Kapellmeister and composer
- Martin Rinkart – German clergyman and hymnist
- Johann Friedrich Rochlitz – German playwright, musicologist, art and music critic
- Johann Theodor Roemhildt – German Baroque composer
- Johann Rosenmüller – German Baroque composer
- Friedrich Ruge – Vice Admiral of the German Navy
- Ernest Sauter – German composer
- Daniel Gottlob Moritz Schreber – German physician and university teacher
- Johann Andreas Schubert – German general engineer and designer
- Johann Gottfried Stallbaum – German classical scholar
- David Timm (born 1969) – German pianist, organist, choral conductor and jazz musician
- Karl Wilhelm Valentiner – German astronomer
- Eduard Vogel – German explorer in Central Africa
- Richard Wagner – German composer, conductor, music theorist and essayist
- Jörg-Peter Weigle – German professor of choir direction
- Friedrich Wieck – German piano and voice teacher, teacher of Robert Schumann, and father of Clara Schumann
- Friedrich Wilhelm Zachau – German Baroque musician and composer, teacher of George Frideric Handel
- Carl Friedrich Zöllner – German composer and choir director

== Notable former teachers ==
- Johann Sebastian Bach – monumental German Baroque composer and organist
- Karl Ferdinand Braun – German inventor, physicist and Nobel Prize laureate
- Sethus Calvisius – German music theorist, composer, chronologer, astronomer and teacher of the late Renaissance
- Otto Crusius – German classical scholar
- Johann August Ernesti – German theologian and philologist
- Georg Fabricius – German poet, historian and archaeologist
- Johann Matthias Gesner – German classical scholar and schoolmaster, an ardent enthusiast of Johann Sebastian Bach
- Moritz Hauptmann – German composer and writer, 6th Cantor (church) of the Thomanerchor after Bach
- Sebastian Knüpfer – German Baroque composer, 3rd Thomaskantor before Bach
- Johann Kuhnau – German Baroque composer, organist and harpsichordist, immediate predecessor as Thomaskantor before Bach
- August Leskien – German linguist
- Johann Adam Hiller – German Classical and Romantic composer, conductor and writer on music, 3rd Thomaskantor after Bach, first Kapellmeister of the Gewandhaus Orchestra Leipzig
- Rudolf Hildebrand – Germanist
- Johann Rosenmüller – German Baroque composer
- Günther Ramin – influential German organist, conductor, composer, pedagogue, and 12th Thomaskantor after Bach
- Georg Rhau – German publisher and composer, first Thomaskantor after church became Protestant, led the Thomanerchor in the opening Mass of the Leipzig Debate, published last known Lutheran Hymnbook during Martin Luther's lifetime
- Ernst Richter – German musical theorist, 8th Thomaskantor after Bach and the immediate predecessor to the post of Wilhelm Rust
- Wilhelm Rust – German musicologist, conductor, and composer, 9th Thomaskantor after Bach
- Johann Hermann Schein – German composer and hymnist of the early Baroque era
- Johann Gottfried Schicht – German composer and conductor, 5th Thomaskantor after Bach
- Karl Straube – German church musician, organist, choral conductor, and teacher, 11th Thomaskantor after Bach, a friend and champion of Max Reger, instructor at the Leipzig Conservatory, and one of the teachers of Karl Richter (conductor); succeeded to the post of Thomaskantor by Günther Ramin
- Jakob Thomasius – German academic philosopher and jurist
- Christian Theodor Weinlig – German music teacher, composer and choir conductor
- Ernst Windisch – German scholar and celticist
- Gustav Ernst Schreck – German composer, music teacher, choirmaster, 1983 Thomaskantor

== See also ==
- List of rectors of Thomasschule zu Leipzig
- St. Thomas Church, Leipzig
- St. Thomas Choir of Leipzig
- List of the oldest schools in the world

== Bibliography ==
- Franz Kemmerling: Die Thomasschule zu Leipzig. Eine kurze Geschichte von ihrer Gründung 1212 bis zum Jahre 1227. Teubner,Leipzig 1927.
- Michael Maul: „Dero berühmbter Chor“: Die Leipziger Thomasschule und ihre Kantoren 1212–1804. Lehmstedt, Leipzig 2012, ISBN 978-3-942473-24-8.
- Corinna Wörner: Zwischen Anpassung und Resistenz. Der Thomanerchor Leipzig in zwei politischen Systemen. Studien und Materialien zur Musikwissenschaft, Bd. 123. Georg Olms Verlag, Hildesheim 2023. (Abstract) ISBN 978-3-487-16232-4.
