= Georg Friedrich Schömann =

German classical scholar

Georg Friedrich Schömann (28 June 1793 – 25 March 1879), was a German classical scholar of Swedish heritage.

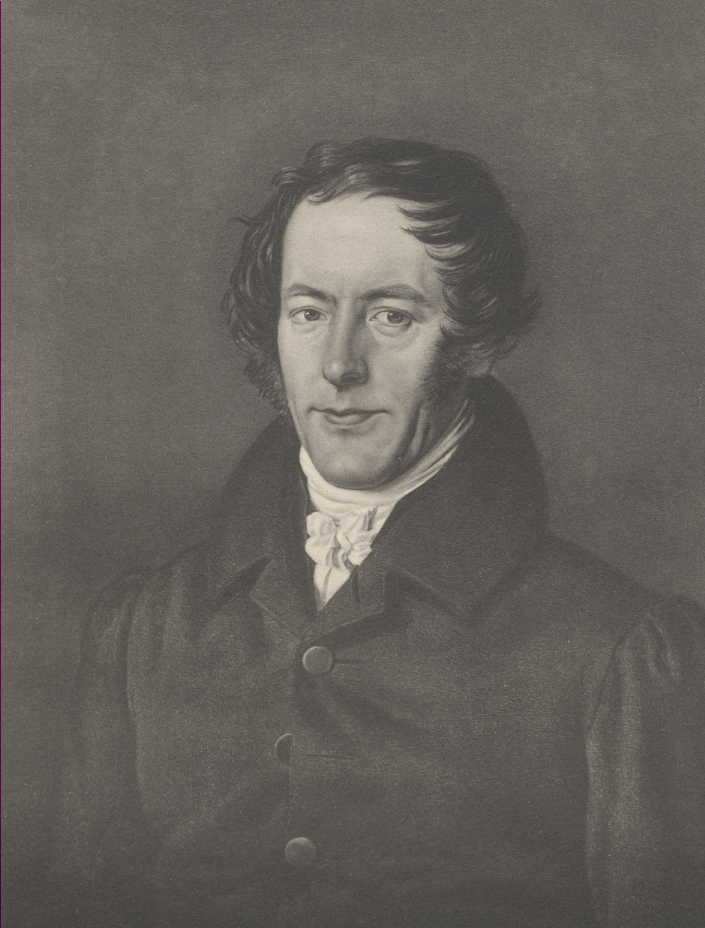
Georg Friedrich Schömann.

== Background ==
He was born at Stralsund in Pomerania. He studied at the Universities of Greifswald and Jena, earning his PhD at Greifswald in 1815. In 1820 he obtained his habilitation with the thesis "De sortitione iudicum apud Athenienses". In 1827 he was appointed professor of ancient literature and rhetoric at the University of Greifswald, where in 1844, he was named first librarian. He died in Greifswald on 25 March 1879.

== Classical studies ==
Schömann's main interest was in the constitutional and religious antiquities of Greece. His first works on the subject were "De comitiis Atheniensium" (1819), the first independent account of the forms of Athenian political life, and a treatise "De sortitione judicum apud Athenienses" (1820). In conjunction with M. H. E. Meier, Schömann wrote "Der attische Process" (1824). Among his other works are:

- editions of Isaeus (1831) and Plutarch's "Agis and Cleomenes" (1839, important for the Attic law of inheritance and the history of the Spartan constitution).
- "Antiquitates juris publici Graecorum" (1838).
- a critical examination of Grote's account of the Athenian constitution (1854, Eng. trans. by Bernard Bosanquet, 1878) from a conservative point of view.
- "Griechische Alterthümer" (2 volumes, 1855, 1859, 2nd edition 1861, 3rd edition 1871-73), treating of the general historical development of the Greek states, followed by a detailed account of the constitutions of Sparta, Crete and Athens, the cults and international relations of the Greek tribes.

The question of the religious institutions of the Greeks, which Schömann considered an essential part of their public life, soon attracted his attention, and he took the view that everything really religious was akin to Christianity, and that the greatest intellects of Greece produced intuitively Christian, dogmatic ideas. From this point of view he edited the "Theogony" of Hesiod (1868), with a commentary, chiefly mythological, and Cicero's "De natura deorum" (1850, 4th ed. 1876); translated with introduction and notes Aeschylus's "Prometheus Bound", and wrote a "Prometheus Unbound" (1844), in which Prometheus is brought to see the greatness of his offense and is pardoned by Zeus. Of his contributions on grammatical subjects special mention may be made of "Die Lehre von den Redetheilen nach den Alten dargestellt und beurtheilt" (1862), an introduction to the elements of the science of grammar. His many-sidedness is shown in his "Opuscula academica" (4 volumes, 1856-1871).

In Samuel Butler’s The Way of All Flesh (1903), the protagonist, Earnest Pontifex, is given a copy of De Comitiis Atheniensibus by his headmaster, Dr. Skinner.
