= Richard Adelbert Lipsius =

German theologian (1830–1892)

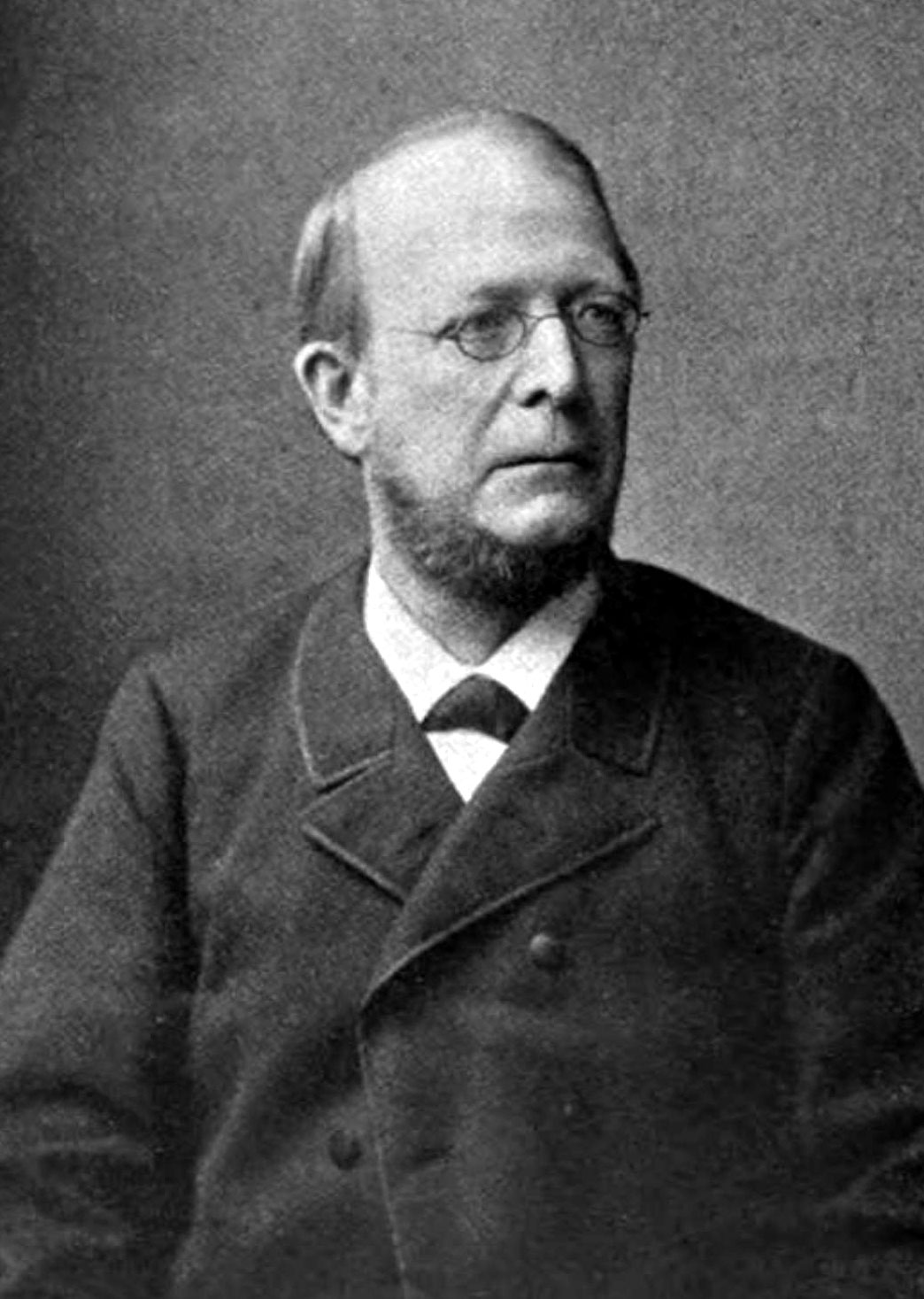
Richard Adelbert Lipsius

Richard Adelbert Lipsius (14 February 1830 in Gera, Thuringia – 19 August 1892 in Jena, Thuringia) was a German Protestant theologian.

== Biography ==
Richard Adelbert Lipsius was the son of K. H. A. Lipsius (d. 1861), who was rector of the school of St. Thomas at Leipzig, was born at Gera on 14 February 1830. He studied at Leipzig, and eventually (1871) settled at Jena as professor ordinaries. He helped to found the "Evangelical Protestant Missionary Union" and the "Evangelical Alliance", and from 1874 took an active part in their management. He died at Jena on 19 August 1892.

== Works ==
Lipsius wrote principally on dogmatics and the history of early Christianity from a liberal and critical standpoint. A Neo-Kantian, he was to some extent an opponent of Albrecht Ritschl, demanding

a connected and consistent theory of the universe, which shall comprehend the entire realm of our experience as a whole. He rejects the doctrine of dualism in a truth, one division of which would be confined to "judgments of value", and be unconnected with our theoretical knowledge of the external world. The possibility of combining the results of our scientific knowledge with the declarations of our ethico-religious experience, so as to form a consistent philosophy, is based, according to Lipsius, upon the unity of the personal ego, which on the one hand knows the world scientifically, and on the other regards it as the means of realizing the ethico-religious object of its life

— Otto Pfleiderer.

This, in part, is Lipsius's attitude in Philosophie und Religion (1885). In his Lehrbuch der evangelisch-protestantischen Dogmatik (1876; 3rd ed., 1893) he deals in detail with the doctrines of "God", "Christ", "Justification" and the "Church". Herausgeber:

From 1875 Lipsius assisted Karl August von Hase (1800-1890), Otto Pfleiderer (1839-1908) and Eberhard Schrader (1836-1908) in editing Jahrbücher für protestantische Theologie, and from 1885 until 1891 he edited the Theologische Jahresbericht.

His other works include:

- Die Pilatusakten (1871, new ed., 1886)
- Dogmatische Beiträge (1878)
- Die Quellen der ältesten Ketzergeschichte (1875)
- Zur Quellenkritik des Epiphanios. Wien, Braumueller, (1865)
- Die apokryphen Apostelgeschichten (1883-1890)
- Hauptpunkte der christl. Glaubenslehre im Umriss dargestellt (1889)
- and commentaries on the Epistles to the Galatians, Romans and Philippians in H.J. Holtzmann's Handkommentar zum Neuen Testament (1891-1892)
