= Otto Crusius (1857–1918) =

German classical scholar

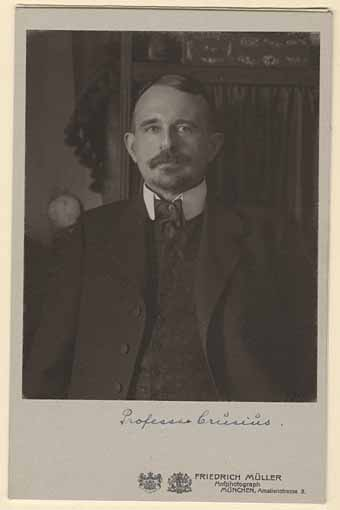
- Crusius in 1910
- Born: 20 December 1857; Hanover
- Died: 29 December 1918 (aged 61); Munich, Bavaria, German Empire

Otto Crusius (20 December 1857 – 29 December 1918) was a German classical scholar. He was born in Hanover and died in Munich.

In his youth he was a student of Franz Ahrens at the Lyceum in Hanover, afterwards studying classical philology at Leipzig University (1875–79). At Leipzig University, his influences included Otto Ribbeck and Rudolf Hildebrand. He earned his habilitation in 1883 and three years later was a professor at the University of Tübingen, succeeding Erwin Rohde. Later on, he worked as a professor at Heidelberg University (from 1898) and at the Ludwig-Maximilians-Universität München (from 1903). In 1915, he became president of the Bavarian Academy of Sciences as well as general curator of the Bavarian State collections.

His works include: "Beiträge zur griechischen Mythologie und Religionsgeschichte" (1886), "Untersuchungen zu den Mimiamben des Herondas" (1892), etc. He published editions of the poet Herondas, the fables of Babrius, "Anthologia lyrica Graeca" (1897 ff) and was an editor of the journal Philologus. After 1909 he published, with others, several volumes of "Das Erbe der Alten. Schriften Über Wesen und Wirkung Der Antike".
