= Justus Hermann Lipsius =

German classical philologist

Justus Hermann Lipsius (9 May 1834, Leipzig – 5 September 1920, Leipzig) was a German classical philologist. He was the brother of theologian Richard Adelbert Lipsius.

He studied theology and philology at the University of Leipzig (1850–1856), where he later served as an associate professor (1869–1877) and full professor (1877–1914) of classical philology. In 1891/92 he was university rector.

He was editor of Andocides (1888) and of Demosthenes, "De corona oratio" (1884), reviser of Moritz Hermann Eduard Meier and Georg Friedrich Schömann's "Der attische Process" (two volumes, Berlin, 1883, 1887) and of Schömann's "Griechische Altertümer" (two volumes, Berlin, 1897, 1901), and author of "Attisches Recht und Rechtsverfassung" (1905–1912). He wrote numerous philological papers and edited "Leipziger Studien zur klassischen Philologie".
