= Ludwig Friedrich Otto Baumgarten-Crusius =

German Protestant theologian (1788–1843)

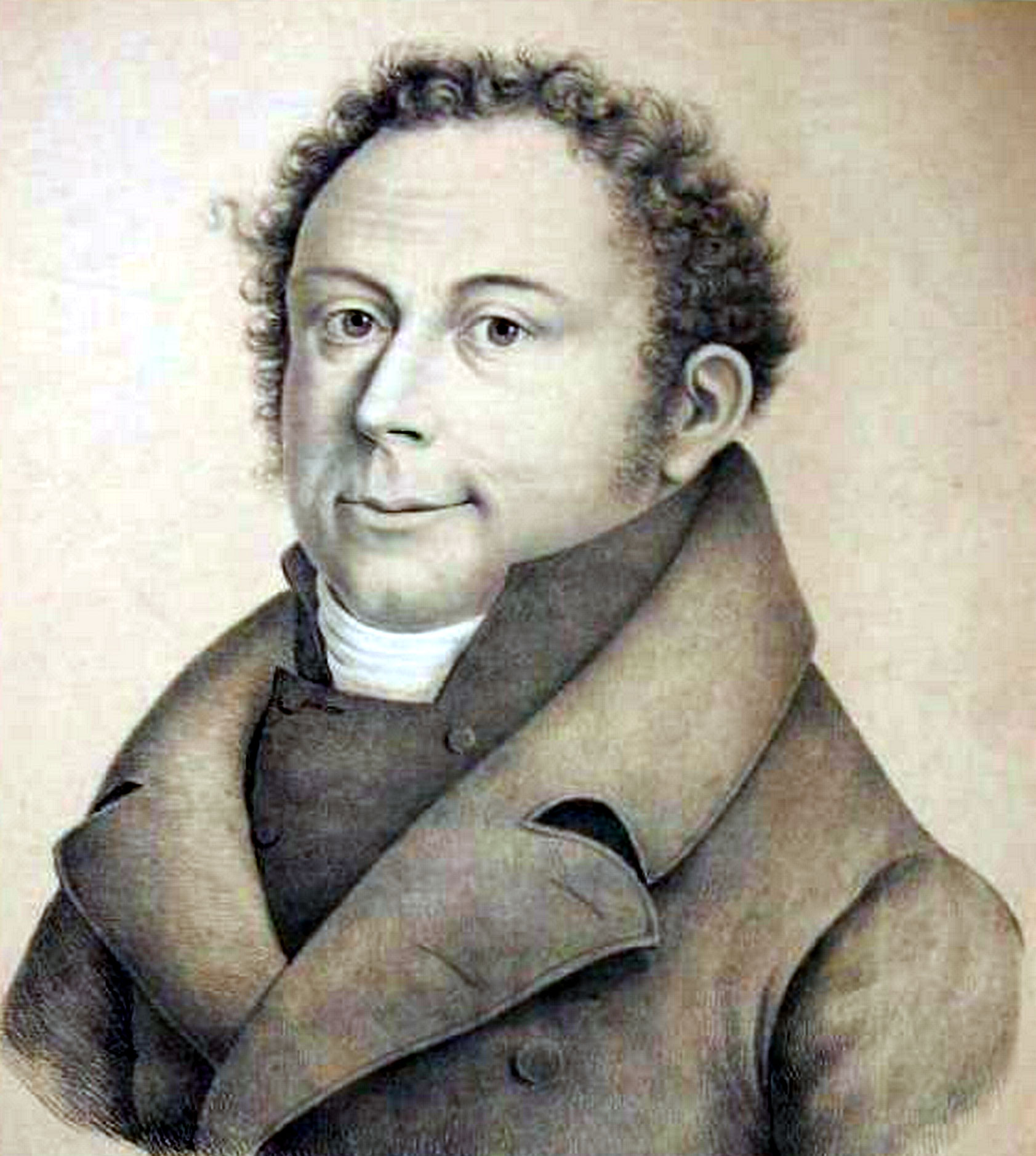
Ludwig Friedrich Otto Baumgarten-Crusius

Ludwig Friedrich Otto Baumgarten-Crusius (31 July 1788 – 31 May 1843) was a German Protestant theologian and divine born in Merseburg. He was the brother of philologist Detlev Karl Wilhelm Baumgarten-Crusius (1786-1845).

== Life ==
In 1805 he entered the University of Leipzig, where he studied theology and philology, becoming a university minister in 1810. In 1812 he became an associate professor of theology at the University of Jena, where in 1817, he attained a full professorship. He would remain at Jena for the rest of his life.

He was considered a champion of religious liberty, a theme that was expressed throughout his various writings. Early in his career, he was influenced by the metaphysics of Schelling, a belief system that he ultimately abandoned as his career progressed.

With the exception of church history, he lectured on all branches of so-called theoretical theology, especially on New Testament exegesis, Biblical theology, dogmatic ethics, and the history of dogma. His comprehensive knowledge, accurate scholarship and wide sympathies gave unusual value to his lectures and treatises, especially those on the development of church doctrine.

== Literary works ==
His published works are many, the most important being:

- Einleitung in die Dogmatik, Leipzig 1820 - Introduction to dogmatics.
- Lehrbuch der christlichen Sittenlehre, Leipzig 1826 - Textbook of Christian ethics.
- Grundzuge der biblischen Theologie, Jena 1828 - Basics of Biblical theology.
- Compendium der Dogmengeschichte, (Leipzig 1840-1846; second part edited by Karl Hase) - Compendium for the history of dogma.
