= St Matthew Passion discography =

Notable recordings of Johann Sebastian Bach's St Matthew Passion (Matthäus-Passion) are shown below in a sortable table.

== History ==
The earliest recordings of the St Matthew Passion were released on 78 records, although this medium was problematic for such a long work, because the discs only offered about 5 minutes per side. The first recording of the work was conducted by David McKinley Williams with the choir of St. Bartholomew's Church, New York in 1930, but it was not complete. There is a live recording of Serge Koussevitzky conducting a complete performance in Boston on Good Friday 1937, sung in English. This has been reissued on CD.

=== Stereophonic recordings and spatial aspects of the work ===
While historic recordings give an opportunity to hear some of the great Bach singers of the past (such as Kathleen Ferrier on the Jacques recording), the introduction of stereophonic sound marked a clear improvement in the musical experience as regards the choral writing. For this complex work, the limited pool of musicians available to Bach in Leipzig was divided between two choirs and orchestras plus a chorus of boy sopranos in the first movement. Choirs I and II and the orchestras were physically separated, and the dramatic nature of their interaction puts mono recordings at a disadvantage. In the case of the Karl Münchinger stereo recording from 1964, the engineers not only captured spatial aspects of the performance in the Ludwigsburg Palace, but also made a conscious effort to give a different acoustic to each of three elements of time identified in Picander's libretto, the time-frame being divided into:

- the Evangelist some years after the events took place
- the events of the gospel narrative themselves
- the reflections of the anonymous soloists and the congregation.

=== Historically informed performance ===
The work was first recorded by large choirs and orchestras. From the late 1960s, historically informed performances (HIP) tried to adhere more to the sounds of the composer's lifetime. In his church music generally, and in this work in particular, Bach wrote for boys choirs and for comparatively small orchestras of Baroque instruments (nowadays these instruments, often referred to as "period instruments", are sometimes antiques and sometimes reconstructions).

Historically informed performances set a trend for recordings with smaller groups which is taken to an extreme in recordings using only one voice per part. Some scholars believe that Bach used only one singer for a vocal part in the choral movements, although the number of singers Bach would have deployed continues to be the subject of debate. Recordings with one voice per part are marked OVPP in this discography. On some of these recordings, the solo singer is reinforced in choral movements with a larger orchestra by a ripieno singer (OVPP+R).

=== Significant recordings ===
The selection is taken from the 281 recordings listed on the Bach Cantatas Website as of 2021, beginning with a recording from 1939 by a symphony orchestra and choir to match (the performance conducted by Willem Mengelberg). In 1970 the first HIP recording appeared, conducted by Nikolaus Harnoncourt. The first OVPP recording appeared in 2003, conducted by Paul McCreesh.

== Table of recordings ==
The sortable listing is taken mostly from the selection provided by Aryeh Oron on the Bach Cantatas Website.

The information lists for one recording typically:

- Conductor / choir / orchestra, often several choirs
- Soloists in the order Evangelist (tenor), Vox Christi (Voice of Jesus, bass), soprano, alto, tenor (if the tenor arias are performed by a different tenor than the evangelist), bass. and some conductors use different soloists in combination with each choir.
- Label
- Year of the recording
- Choir type
  1. Large choirs (red background): Bach (choir dedicated to Bach's music, founded in the mid of the 20th century), Boys (choir of all male voices), Radio (choir of a broadcaster), Symphony (choir related to a symphony orchestra)
  2. Medium-size choirs, such as Chamber choir, Chorale (choir dedicated mostly to church music), Madrigal
  3. One voice per part (green background): OVPP or OVPP+R (with ripienists reinforcing the soloists in some chorale movements)
- Orch. type (orchestra type)
  1. Large orchestras (red background): Large (unspecified), Bach (orchestra dedicated to Bach's music, founded in the mid of the 20th century), Radio (symphony orchestra of a broadcaster), Opera, Symphony
  2. Chamber orchestra
  3. Orchestra on period instruments (green background)
- Notes

Recordings of Bach's St Matthew Passion, BWV 244
Conductor / Choir / Orchestra	Soloists	Label	Year	Choir type	Orch. type	Notes
Willem Mengelberg: Toonkunstkoor Amsterdam; Jongenskoor "Zanglust"; Royal Concertgebouw Orchestra	Karl Erb; Willem Ravelli; Jo Vincent; Ilona Durigo; Louis van Tulder; Hermann Schey	Philips	1939	Large	Symphony	
Reginald Jacques The Bach Choir The Jacques Orchestra	Eric Greene; Henry Cummings; Elsie Suddaby; Kathleen Ferrier; William Parsons	Decca	1947	Bach	Large	(Note: Novello edition: music edited by Atkins & Elgar; English translation by Johnson & Troutbeck. Omits Nos. 11, 21, 65, 66; Abridged Nos. 10, 12. Released on 78s, re-released on LPs)
Fritz Lehmann: Großer Chor des Berliner Rundfunks; Boys' Choir of the St. Hedwig's Cathedral; Rundfunk-Sinfonieorchester Berlin	Helmut Krebs; Dietrich Fischer-Dieskau; Elfriede Trötschel; Diana Eustrati; Friedrich Härtel	Vox	1949	Boys	Radio	
Hermann Scherchen Wiener Akademie-Kammerchor Orchestra of the Vienna State Opera	Petre Munteanu; Heinz Rehfuss; Magda László; Hilde Rössel-Majdan; Hugues Cuénod; Richard Standen	Westminster	1953		Opera	
Wilhelm Furtwängler Wiener Singverein; Wiener Sängerknaben Wiener Philharmoniker	Anton Dermota; Dietrich Fischer-Dieskau; Elisabeth Grümmer; Marga Höffgen; Otto Edelmann		1954		Symphony	
Ralph Vaughan Williams Leith Hill Musical Festival Orchestra & Chorus	Eric Greene; Gordon Clinton; Pauline Brockless; Nancy Evans; Wilfred Brown; John Carol Case	Pearl	1958		Large	released in 2000
Fritz Werner: Heinrich-Schütz-Chor Heilbronn; Boys' Choir of Robert-Mayer-School of Heilbronn; Pforzheim Chamber Orchestra	Helmut Krebs; Franz Kelch; Agnes Giebel; Renate Günther; Hermann Wedermann	Erato	1958		Chamber	
Mogens Wöldike Schottenstift Boys' Choir Orchestra of the Vienna State Opera	Uno Ebrelius; Hans Braun; Teresa Stich-Randall; Hilde Rössel-Majdan; Waldemar Kmentt; Walter Berry	Vanguard Classics	1959	Boys	Opera	
Karl Richter: Münchener Bach-Chor; Münchener Chorknaben; Münchener Bach-Orchester	Ernst Haefliger; Kieth Engen; Irmgard Seefried; Antonia Fahberg; Hertha Töpper; Dietrich Fischer-Dieskau; Max Proebstl	Archiv Produktion	1959	Bach	Bach	(Note: later re-issued (choruses & arias only) on Deutsche Grammophon)
Otto Klemperer Philharmonia Chorus Philharmonia Orchestra	Peter Pears; Dietrich Fischer-Dieskau; Elisabeth Schwarzkopf; Christa Ludwig; Nicolai Gedda; Walter Berry; Geraint Evans	EMI	1962	Symphony	Symphony	
Leonard Bernstein Collegiate Chorale New York Philharmonic	David Lloyd; William Wildermann; Adele Addison; Betty Allen; Charles Bressler; Donald Bell	Columbia Masterworks Records	1962	Chorale	Symphony	slightly abridged, sung in English later re-issued on Sony Masterworks
Karl Munchinger Stuttgart Hymnus Boys' Choir Stuttgart Chamber Orchestra	Peter Pears; Hermann Prey; Elly Ameling; Marga Höffgen; Fritz Wunderlich; Tom Krause	Decca	1964	Boys	Chamber	
Eugen Jochum Netherlands Radio Choir; Boys' Choir of St Willibrord Church, Amsterdam Royal Concertgebouw Orchestra	Ernst Haefliger; Walter Berry; Agnes Giebel; Marga Höffgen; John van Kesteren; Franz Crass; Leo Ketelaars	Philips	1966		Radio	
Wolfgang Gönnenwein Süddeutscher Madrigalchor Consortium Musicum	Theo Altmeyer; Franz Crass; Teresa Żylis-Gara; Julia Hamari; Nicolai Gedda; Hermann Prey	EMI	1968	Madrigal	Chamber	
Claudio Abbado: Coro di Voci Bianche dell'Oratorio dell'Immacolata di Bergamo; Coro di Milano della RAI; Orchestra Sinfonica della RAI	Peter Schreier; Hermann Prey; Teresa Żylis-Gara; Fiorella Pediconi; Margarita Lilowa; Max van Egmond	Dino Classics	1969	Radio	Radio	
Karl Richter: Münchener Bach-Chor; Münchener Chorknaben; Münchener Bach-Orchester	Ernst Haefliger; Kieth Engen; Ursula Buckel; Marga Höffgen; Peter van der Bilt	Archiv Produktion	1969	Bach	Bach	recorded live at Tokyo Bunka Kaikan
Erhard Mauersberger; Rudolf Mauersberger; Hans-Joachim Rotzsch: Dresdner Kreuzchor; Thomanerchor; Gewandhausorchester	Peter Schreier; Theo Adam; Adele Stolte; Annelies Burmeister; Günther Leib	Eterna	1970	Boys	Symphony	(Note: collaboration of two conductors (and brothers) and their boys' choirs, re-issued in 2005 Berlin Classics)
Nikolaus Harnoncourt: Regensburger Domspatzen; Men's Voices of the King's College Choir; Concentus Musicus Wien	Kurt Equiluz; Karl Ridderbusch; Soloists of the Wiener Sängerknaben; Tom Sutcliffe; Paul Esswood; James Bowman; Nigel Rogers; Max van Egmond; Michael Schopper	Teldec	1970	Boys	Period	First HIP
Karl Richter Münchener Bach-Chor; Münchener Chorknaben Münchener Bach-Orchester	Peter Schreier; Ernst Gerold Schramm; Helen Donath; Julia Hamari; Horst Laubenthal; Siegmund Nimsgern; Walter Berry	Deutsche Grammophon	1971	Bach	Bach	DVD, released in 2006
Herbert von Karajan: Wiener Singverein; Choir of the Deutsche Oper Berlin; Boys' voices of the Staats- und Domchor, Berlin; Berlin Philharmonic	Peter Schreier; Dietrich Fischer-Dieskau; Gundula Janowitz; Christa Ludwig; Horst Laubenthal; Walter Berry; Anton Diakov	Deutsche Grammophon	1972	Large	Symphony	
Johan van der Meer Groningse Bachvereniging: Leonhardt-Consort; Alarius-Ensemble; Musica da Camera	Marius van Altena; Max van Egmond; Three soloists of the Tölzer Knabenchor; René Jacobs; Harry Geraerts; Michiel ten Houte de Lange; Frits van Erven Dorens; Harry van der Kamp	Groningse Bachvereniging (self release)	1973	Bach	Period	
Charles de Wolff: De Nederlandse Bachvereniging; Koorschool St. Bavo, Haarlem; Residentie Orkest	Kurt Equiluz; Max van Egmond; Sheila Armstrong; Maureen Lehane; Neil Jenkins; Hermann Christian Polster	COrneMuse	1977	Bach	Period	
Helmuth Rilling Gächinger Kantorei Bach-Collegium Stuttgart	Adalbert Kraus; Siegmund Nimsgern; Arleen Auger; Julia Hamari; Ann Murray; Aldo Baldin; Philippe Huttenlocher	Columbia Masterworks Records	1978	Chorale	Chamber	later re-issued on Sony Masterworks
David Willcocks: The Bach Choir; Boys of St Paul's Cathedral Choir; Thames Chamber Orchestra	Robert Tear; John Shirley-Quirk; Felicity Lott; Alfreda Hodgson; Neil Jenkins; Stephen Roberts	Decca	1979	Bach	Chamber	Sung in English re-issued in 2006 on Universal Classics
Karl Richter: Münchener Bach-Chor; Regensburger Domspatzen; Münchener Bach-Orchester	Peter Schreier; Dietrich Fischer-Dieskau; Edith Mathis; Janet Baker; Matti Salminen	Archiv Produktion	1979	Bach	Bach	(Note: 5th recording Richter, recorded at Herkulessaal, Munich Residenz; last recording of work by Richter (recorded 2 years before his death))
Philippe Herreweghe Collegium Vocale Gent; Chœur d'Enfants "Il dulci jubilo" Instrumentalists of Collegium Vocale Gent; La Chapelle Royale	Howard Crook; Ulrik Cold; Barbara Schlick; René Jacobs; Hans Peter Blochwitz; Peter Kooy	Harmonia Mundi	1985		Period	
Peter Schreier Rundfunkchor Leipzig Staatskapelle Dresden	Peter Schreier; Theo Adam; Lucia Popp; Marjana Lipovšek; Eberhard Büchner; Robert Holl	Philips	1985	Radio	Symphony	
Georg Solti Chicago Symphony Chorus Chicago Symphony Orchestra	Hans Peter Blochwitz; Olaf Bär; Kiri Te Kanawa; Anne Sofie von Otter; Anthony Rolfe Johnson; Tom Krause	Decca	1988	Symphony	Symphony	
John Eliot Gardiner Monteverdi Choir English Baroque Soloists	Anthony Rolfe Johnson; Andreas Schmidt; Barbara Bonney; Ann Monoyios; Anne Sofie von Otter; Michael Chance; Howard Crook; Olaf Bär; Cornelius Hauptmann	Archiv Produktion	1989		Period	
Gustav Leonhardt: Tölzer Knabenchor; Men's choir of La Petite Bande; La Petite Bande	Christoph Prégardien; Max van Egmond; Christian Fliegner (boy soprano); Maximilian Kiener (boy soprano); René Jacobs; David Cordier; John Elwes; Markus Schäfer; Klaus Mertens; Peter Lika	Deutsche Harmonia Mundi	1989	Boys	Period	
Ton Koopman De Nederlandse Bachvereniging; Sacramentskoor Breda Amsterdam Baroque Orchestra	Guy de Mey; Peter Kooy; Barbara Schlick; Kai Wessel; Christoph Prégardien; Klaus Mertens	Erato	1993	Bach	Period	
Stephen Cleobury: Choir of King's College, Cambridge; Choir of Jesus College, Cambridge; The Brandenburg Consort	Rogers Covey-Crump; Michael George; Emma Kirkby; Michael Chance; Martyn Hill; David Thomas	Brilliant Classics/Regis	1994	Boys	Period	(Note: also on DVD, filmed and recorded at King's College Chapel, Cambridge)
Frans Brüggen: Koorschool St. Bavo, Haarlem; Nederlands Kamerkoor; Orchestra of the Eighteenth Century	Nico van der Meel; Kristinn Sigmundsson; María Cristina Kiehr; Mona Julsrud; Claudia Schubert; Wilke te Brummelstroete; Ian Bostridge; Toby Spence; Peter Kooy; Harry van der Kamp	Philips	1996	Chamber	Period	
Jos van Veldhoven De Nederlandse Bachvereniging; Koorschool St. Bavo, Haarlem	Gerd Türk; Geert Smits; Johannette Zomer; Andreas Scholl; Hans-Jörg Mammel; Peter Kooy	Channel Classics	1997	Bach	Period	recorded live at Muziekcentrum Vredenburg
Seiji Ozawa SKF Matsumoto Children's Choir & Tokyo Opera Singers Saito Kinen Orchestra	John Mark Ainsley; Thomas Quasthoff; Christiane Oelze; Nathalie Stutzmann; Stanford Olsen; Michael Volle; Katsunori Kono	Philips	1997	Radio	Radio	
Philippe Herreweghe Collegium Vocale Gent	Ian Bostridge; Franz-Josef Selig; Sibylla Rubens; Andreas Scholl; Werner Güra; Dietrich Henschel	Harmonia Mundi	1998		Period	
Masaaki Suzuki Bach Collegium Japan	Gerd Türk; Peter Kooy; Nancy Argenta; Robin Blaze; Makoto Sakurada; Chiyuki Urano	BIS	1999		Period	
Heinz Hennig Knabenchor Hannover; Thomanerchor Akademie für Alte Musik Berlin; Barockorchester L'Arco	Gerd Türk; Hanno Müller-Brachmann; Elisabeth Scholl; Nathalie Stutzmann; Andreas Karasiak; Thomas Mohr	Thorofon	2000	Boys	Period	Collaboration of two boys' choirs
Nikolaus Harnoncourt: Arnold Schoenberg Chor; Wiener Sängerknaben; Concentus Musicus Wien	Christoph Prégardien; Matthias Goerne; Christine Schäfer; Dorothea Röschmann; Bernarda Fink; Elisabeth von Magnus; Michael Schade; Markus Schäfer; Dietrich Henschel; Oliver Widmer	Teldec	2001		Period	(Note: 2001 Grammy Award for "Best Choral Performance", 2001 Gramophone magazine award for "Best Baroque Vocal Recording")
Paul McCreesh Gabrieli Consort & Players	Deborah York; Julia Gooding; Magdalena Kožená; Susan Bickley; Mark Padmore; James Gilchrist; Peter Harvey; Stephan Loges	Archiv Produktion	2003	OVPP	Period	First OVPP
Enoch zu Guttenberg: Chorgemeinschaft Neubeuern; Tölzer Knabenchor; Orchester der Klangverwaltung	Marcus Ullmann; Klaus Mertens; Anna Korondi; Anke Vondung; Werner Güra; Hans Christoph Begemann	Farao Classics	2003	Large	Large	
Ton Koopman Amsterdam Baroque Orchestra & Choir; Sacramentskoor Breda	Jörg Dürmüller; Ekkehard Abele; Cornelia Samuelis; Bogna Bartosz; Paul Agnew; Klaus Mertens	Challenge Classics	2006		Period	(Note: also on DVD, filmed and recorded at Sint-Joriskerk, Amersfoort)
John Butt Dunedin Consort	Nicholas Mulroy; Matthew Brook; Susan Hamilton; Cecilia Osmond; Clare Wilkinson; Annie Gill; Malcolm Bennett; Brian Bannatyne-Scott	Linn Records	2008	OVPP+R	Period	Recording of 1742 version
Sigiswald Kuijken La Petite Bande	Christoph Genz; Jan van der Crabben; Gerlinde Sämann; Marie Kuijken; Petra Noskaiová; Patrizia Hardt; Bernhard Hunziker; Marcus Niedermeyr	Challenge Classics	2008	OVPP	Period	
Riccardo Chailly: Tölzer Knabenchor; Thomanerchor; La Petite Bande	Johannes Chum; Hanno Müller-Brachmann; Christina Landshamer; Marie-Claude Chappuis; Thomas Quasthoff; Maximilian Schmitt; Klaus Häger	Decca	2009	Boys	Symphony	collaboration of two boys' choirs
Jos van Veldhoven De Nederlandse Bachvereniging; Kampen Boys Choir	Gerd Türk; Amaryllis Dieltiens; Siri Thornhill; Tim Mead; Matthew White; Julian Podger; Charles Daniels; Peter Harvey; Sebastian Noack	Channel Classics	2010	OVPP+R	Period	
René Jacobs RIAS Kammerchor; Staats- und Domchor Berlin Akademie für Alte Musik Berlin	Werner Güra; Johannes Weisser; Sunhae Im; Bernarda Fink; Topi Lehtipuu; Konstantin Wolff	Harmonia Mundi	2013	Chamber	Period	
Peter Dijkstra Bavarian Radio Choir; Regensburger Domspatzen Bavarian Radio Symphony Orchestra	Julian Prégardien; Karl-Magnus Fredriksson; Karina Gauvin; Gerhild Romberger; Maximilian Schmitt; Michael Nagy	BR-Klassik	2014	Radio	Radio	
Hans-Christoph Rademann Gaechinger Cantorey	Benedikt Kristjánsson; Krešimir Stražanac; Gerlinde Sämann; Isabel Jantschek; Benno Schachtner; Paul Schweinester; Peter Harvey	Accentus Music	2017	Chorale	Period	DVD of choreographed performance
Stephen Cleobury Choir of King's College, Cambridge The Academy of Ancient Music	James Gilchrist; Matthew Rose; Sophie Bevan; David Allsopp; Mark Le Brocq; William Gaunt	Brilliant Classics	2019	Boys	Period	
