= Der Gemischte Chor Zürich =

- Choir
- Origin: Zürich
- Founded: 1863
- Genre: Mixed oratorio choir
- Members: 100–120
- Chief conductor: Joachim Krause
- Website: www.gemischter-chor.ch

Der Gemischte Chor Zürich (often Gemischter Chor) is a mixed choir in Zürich, Switzerland, founded in 1863. One of the large oratorio choirs in the city, they perform regularly at the Tonhalle and internationally, often with the Tonhalle-Orchester Zürich, and traditionally with notable soloists such as Ilona Durigo, Karl Erb and Ernst Häfliger. Premieres have included works by Johannes Brahms and contemporary composers.

== History ==
The first concert of Der Gemischte Chor was in Haydn's Die Schöpfung in December 1863. A year later, concerts on Good Friday became a tradition. The choir performed from the beginning Passions by Bach and others, oratorios and Requiem settings. In fall concerts, contemporary music was in focus. Johannes Brahms rehearsed and conducted several of his works with the choir, including Ein deutsches Requiem in 1869 and the premiere of Nänie in 1881. Other guest conductors included Max Bruch, Camille Saint-Saëns and Richard Strauss. Carl Schuricht conducted performances of Beethoven's Ninth Symphony as part of the Festwochen on 2 July 1957.

The choir was, together with others, instrumental in founding the first Tonhalle, its first permanent orchestra in 1868, and the building of an organ in 1872. It has performed internationally, singing for example in 1911 the Italian premiere of Bach's St Matthew Passion at La Scala in Milan. In 1984, the choir performed Heinrich Suter's Le laudi di San Francesco d’Assisi at the Alte Oper in Frankfurt, and in 1985 Handel's Jephtha in Prague. Works by Swiss composers also included Willy Burkhard's Das Gesicht Jesajas, Honegger's Le Roi David and Jüngst und einst by Paul Suits. The choir performed premieres of commissioned works, in October 2006 Au-delà du regard by Martin Derungs after poems by the Lebanese writer Nadia Tuéni, and for the 150th anniversary in 2013, D’un pays lointain by Edward Rushton. In 2017, the choir performed Frank Martin's Golgotha.

== Conductors ==
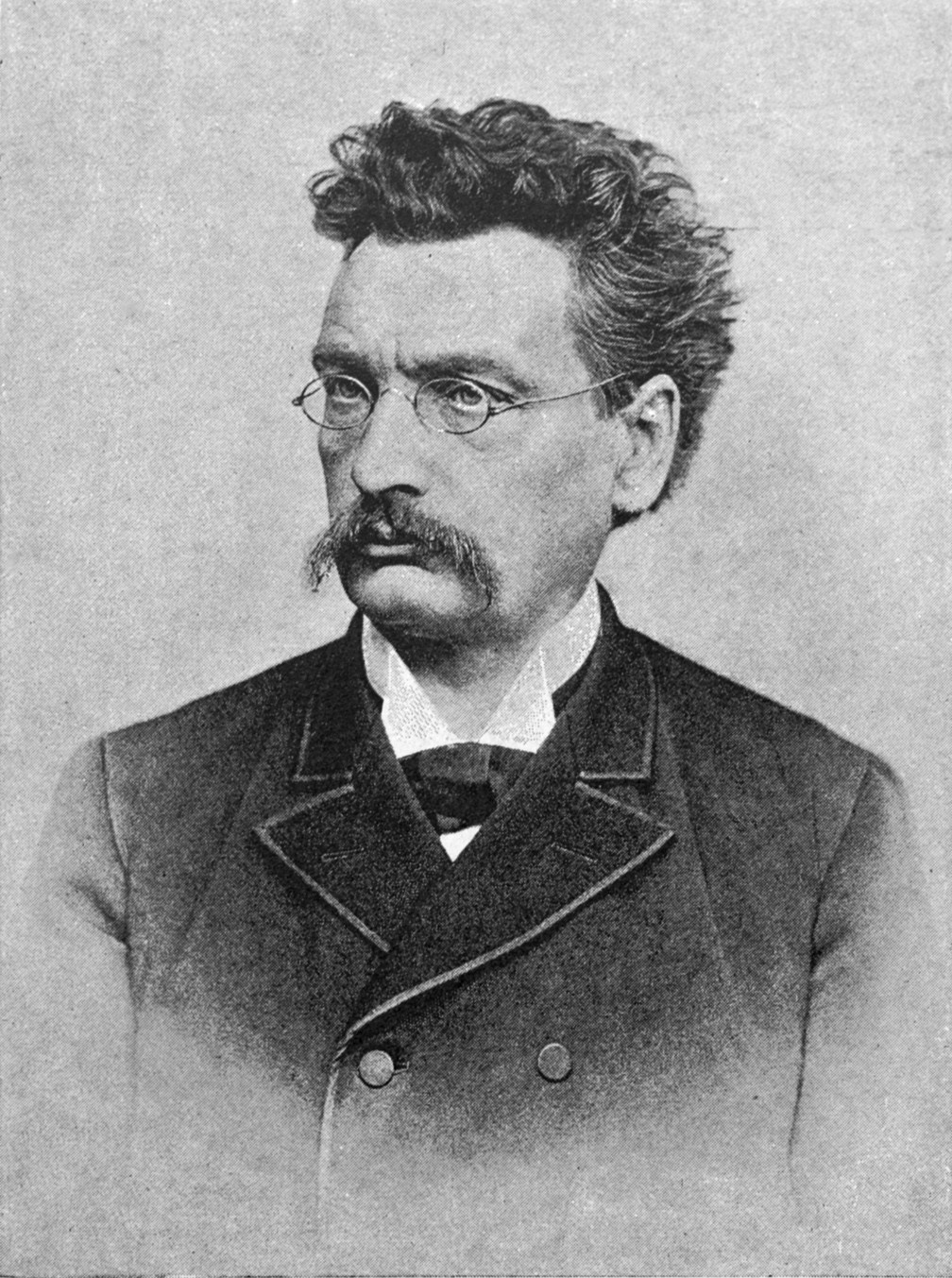
Friedrich Hegar

The first regular conductor was the composer Friedrich Hegar, who directed the choir until 1901, and was also the first conductor of the Tonhalle-Orchester from 1868 to 1906. He was succeeded by Hermann Suter, Volkmar Andreae, Erich Schmid, Räto Tschupp, and from 1996, Joachim Krause. Krause has focused on Bach, French composers and music of the 20th and 21st centuries. In the fall concerts, he introduced lesser known music by contemporary composers, including commissioned new works.

== Soloists ==
From the beginning, the choir performed with international soloists. The German heldentenor Heinrich Vogl was a soloist in 9 concerts between 1872 and 1885. The contralto Ilona Durigo from Budapest was a soloist in more than 40 concerts between 1911 and 1943. The German tenor Karl Erb performed from 1920 to 1938 in 12 concerts, especially as the Evangelist in Bach's Passions. The bass Felix Loeffel performed from 1922 and 1937 in 16 concerts, including Bach's St Matthew Passion in 1929, and Paul Hindemith's Das Unaufhörliche in 1932, a year after the premiere. The tenor Ernst Häfliger made his debut as the Evangelist in Bach's St John Passion in the Good Friday concerts of 1943 and sang regularly, in 38 concerts until 1984.

Soloists in the 20th century have also included sopranos Ursula Buckel, Lisa della Casa, Edith Mathis, Elisabeth Speiser and Maria Stader, contralto Elsa Cavelti, tenor and Kurt Huber, and basses Heinz Rehfuss and Jakob Stämpfli.

== Archive ==
The Zentralbibliothek Zürich has held from 1980 the archive of the choir, including manuscripts, letters, protocols, invoices, contracts, membership lists, concert programs and music.

== Literature ==
- 150 Jahre Musik für Zürich : der Gemischte Chor Zürich, 1863–2013 (Festschrift 2013). Martin Derungs, Margrit Eugster et al.; Kommissionsverlag Hug, Zürich 2013, ISBN 978-3-905847-74-1.
