= Kurt Widmer =

Swiss baritone and voice teacher (1940–2023)

- Born: 28 December 1940; Wil, Canton of St. Gallen, Switzerland
- Died: 31 May 2023 (aged 82); Basel, Switzerland
- Education: Zürich Conservatory
- Occupations: Baritone; Academic teacher
- Organizations: City of Basel Music Academy
- Children: Oliver Widmer
- Awards: Grand Prix du Disque; Deutscher Schallplattenpreis
- Website: www.musaios.ch/index1.htm

Kurt Widmer (28 December 1940 – 31 May 2023) was a Swiss baritone and voice teacher, who appeared and recorded internationally. He focused on concert singing, especially of oratorios from the Romantic period. His recordings cover a repertoire from medieval mass to world premieres, such as song cycles by György Kurtág, and received international awards. He taught at the City of Basel Music Academy from 1968, influencing notable soloists including Nuria Rial and his son, Oliver Widmer.

== Career ==
Born in Wil, Canton of St. Gallen, Widmer first studied to be a teacher at the Lehrerseminar in Rorschach, and taught in Bronschhofen. He then studied violin and voice at the Zürich Conservatory with Ria Ginster, and took master classes with Franziska Martienssen-Lohmann and her husband Paul Lohmann in Lucerne and Wiesbaden.

From 1966, Widmer performed in concert in Switzerland and internationally, with a focus on oratorios from the Romantic period. He was a soloist with Der Gemischte Chor Zürich between 1967 and 1992 in 24 concerts, beginning in 1967 with Bach's cantata Gott der Herr ist Sonn und Schild, BWV 79 and Beethoven's Mass in C major in 1967, alongside Elisabeth Speiser, Verena Gohl and Kurt Huber. It was followed by Bach's St Matthew Passion and St John Passion, Graun's Der Tod Jesu and Ein deutsches Requiem by Johannes Brahms. He performed in 19th century works including Dvorak's Stabat Mater and Verdi's Requiem, and in 20th-century oratorios such as Suter's Le Laudi, Honegger's Totentanz and Martin's Golgotha.

Widmer toured in Europe, and also in Israel, Canada, Russia, Japan and the US, with conductors such as Rafael Frühbeck de Burgos, Michael Gielen, Paul Sacher, Wolfgang Sawallisch, Horst Stein and Jesús López Cobos. He sang in the premieres of more than hundred contemporary compositions. Even as a soloist in demand internationally, he kept singing as a soloist with the chamber choir of his hometown.

From 1968, Widmer was a teacher at the City of Basel Music Academy. Among his students were Marion Ammann, Miriam Feuersinger, Montserrat Figueras, Werner Güra, Nuria Rial, Anna Lucia Richter, and his son, Oliver Widmer. He held master classes in Bolzano, Kufstein, Linz, Moscow, Salzburg, Stuttgart, Tokyo, Trier, Vaduz and Vienna, and had a master class scheduled when he died.

His son Oliver Widmer is also a notable baritone, and the husband of Cecilia Bartoli.

Widmer wrote a book, published in 2018: Und niemand merkt, dass die Giraffe brennt. Gesang ist innerer Bewegung Klang. An English edition was published in 2023: And nobody realizes the giraffe is set ablaze: Song is the tune of inherent movement.

Widmer died in Basel on 31 May 2023, at age 82.

== Recordings ==
Widmer made recordings for radio and records with a repertoire from Machaut's Mass to around hundred world premieres. He recorded with Süddeutscher Madrigalchor and conducted by Wolfgang Gönnenwein, Ein deutsches Requiem by Brahms, alongside soprano Helen Donath, both Haydn's Die Jahreszeiten and Die Schöpfung, with Donath and Adalbert Kraus, and Beethoven's Missa solemnis, with Sylvia Geszty, Doris Soffel, David Rendall, and the Collegium Aureum. Widmer was the narrator the Christmas Story by Heinrich Schütz, conducted by Louis Devos, in 1985. He recorded Fauré's Requiem in 1986, with soprano Edith Mathis, the Lucerne Festival Chorus and the Swiss Festival Orchestra, conducted by Jean Fournet. In 1988, he was a soloist in the first recording of François-Joseph Gossec's Requiem, with Bernadette Degelin, Greta De Reyghere, Howard Crook, the Maastricht conservatory chamber choir and Musica Polyphonica, conducted by Devos.

Widmer recorded the Oratorio de Noël by Camille Saint-Saëns with the Bachchor Mainz and Bachorchester Mainz conducted by Diethard Hellmann. He was a soloist in Domenico Cimarosa's Requiem with Vittorio Negri conducting. In 2003, he recorded new song cycles by György Kurtág after Friedrich Hölderlin and Samuel Beckett, a recording awarded several prizes including the Preis der deutschen Schallplattenkritik.

== Publication ==
- Und niemand merkt, dass die Giraffe brennt: Gesang ist innerer Bewegung Klang. Cardamina Verlag, Weißenthurm 2018, ISBN 978-3-86424-399-8.
- And nobody realizes the giraffe is set ablaze: Song is the tune of inherent movement. Cardamina Verlag, Koblenz 2023, ISBN 978-3-86424-593-0.

== Awards ==
- 1967: Solistenpreis des Schweizerischen Tonkünstlervereins
- 1985: Regio Preis für Musik des Oberrhein–Vereins zur Förderung der Wirtschaft
- 1997: Kunstpreis Baselland
- 2007: Kulturpreis der Stadt Wil
- Grand Prix du Disque
- Diaposon d'or de l'Académie Prix du Disque Français
- Deutscher Schallplattenpreis
- Preis der Deutschen Schallplattenkritik
