= Elisabeth Speiser =

Swiss operatic soprano

- Born: 15 October 1940 (age 84); Zürich, Switzerland
- Occupation: Operatic soprano

Elisabeth Speiser (born 1 October 1940) is a Swiss classical soprano, known principally for singing Lieder but also active in opera. She has appeared internationally.

== Biography ==
Born in Zürich, Speiser appeared in concert from 1960. She was a regular soloist with the choir Der Gemischte Chor Zürich. Performances included Bach's cantata Gott der Herr ist Sonn und Schild, BWV 79, and Beethoven's Mass in C major in 1967, Mozart's Requiem and Vesperae solennes in 1968, Ein deutsches Requiem by Brahms in 1969, Arthur Honegger's Totentanz in 1970, Haydn's Nelson Mass the same year, Hermann Suter's Le Laudi in 1972, alongside Marga Höffgen, Kurt Huber and Kurt Widmer, Frank Martin's Golgotha in 1972 and 1975, Cherubini's Missa solemnis in 1977.

Speiser appeared in 1969 as Sandrina in the first recording of Haydn's opera L'infedeltà delusa, conducted by Antonio de Almeida. She was Euridice in Gluck's Orfeo ed Euridice at the Glyndebourne Festival, alongside Janet Baker as Orfeo and Elisabeth Gale as Amore, which was recorded in 1982. She also sang Pamina in Glyndebourne's production of Die Zauberflöte alongside Edita Gruberova as Queen of the night in 1973. She is known for the title role of Melisande in Debussy's Pelléas et Mélisande.

Speiser was also a Lieder singer. She recorded in 1975 songs by Schumann, Schubert, Brahms, Hugo Wolf's Lieder der Mignon, Anton Webern's Vier Lieder, Op. 12, and Debussy's Ariettes oubliées, with pianists Irwin Gage and John Buttrick. A reviewer described her voice as bright, and noted her diction and her phrasing following the text. He noted her affinity to Wolf's chromaticism, Webern's fine lines, and to the sounds of Debussy.

With her husband, Hans Jecklin, she founded the E.+H.-Kulturstiftung Zürich, a foundation for culture.

== Bibliography ==
- Hagmann, Peter (2015). "Der fruchtbare Blick zurück". Neue Zürcher Zeitung (in German).
- Osborne, Charles (2007). The Opera Lover's Companion. Yale University Press. p. 150. ISBN 978-0-30-012373-9.
- Steiger, Karsten (1983). Opern-Diskographie: Verzeichnis aller Audio- und Video-Gesamtaufnahmen (in German). Walter de Gruyter. pp. 168, 198. ISBN 9783110955965. Archived from the original on 14 February 2018.
- "Elisabeth Speiser (Soprano)". Bach Cantatas Website. 2007.
- "Liste der Solistinnen und Solisten" (in German). Der Gemischte Chor Zürich.
- "Willkommen bei der E.&H.-Kulturstiftung Zürich". eh-kultur.ch (in German).
