= Spring Symphony =

1949 choral symphony by Benjamin Britten

- Choral symphony
- by Benjamin Britten
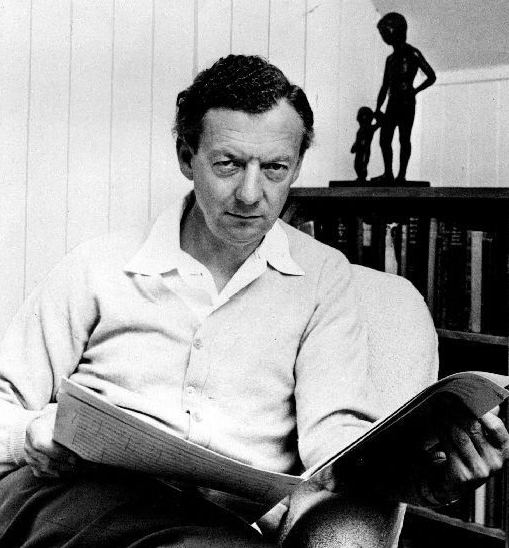
- Britten in 1968
- Opus: 44
- Text: songs by various poets
- Language: English
- Dedication: Serge Koussevitzky and the Boston Symphony Orchestra
- Performed: 14 July 1949
- Duration: 45 min.
- Scoring: soprano; alto; tenor; boys' choir; mixed choir; orchestra

Spring Symphony is a choral symphony by Benjamin Britten, his Opus 44. The work is scored for soprano, alto and tenor soloists, mixed choir, boys' choir and orchestra. Britten used texts of several poems related to spring, mostly from the 16th and 17th centuries and also one by W. H. Auden. Britten dedicated the work to Serge Koussevitzky and the Boston Symphony Orchestra. The work received its premiere in the Concertgebouw, Amsterdam on 14 July 1949 as part of the Holland Festival

== History ==
Britten composed Spring Symphony on a commission by the Koussevitzky Music Foundation. He wrote it for soprano, alto and tenor soloists, mixed choir, boys' choir (often performed by children's choir instead) and orchestra. He used poetry chiefly from the 16th and 17th century, by Edmund Spenser, John Clare and George Peele, among others, and also the 20th century poem 'Out on the lawn I lie in bed' by W. H. Auden. In the composer's own words, the work represents "the progress of Winter to Spring and the reawakening of the earth and life which that means".

The choral symphony was premiered in the Concertgebouw, Amsterdam, on Thursday 14 July 1949 (not 9 July which is quoted by many sources) as part of the Holland Festival, when the composer was age 35. At the premiere, the soloists were soprano Jo Vincent, contralto Kathleen Ferrier, and tenor Peter Pears, with Eduard van Beinum conducting the Concertgebouw Orchestra of Amsterdam, the Netherlands Radio Choir, and the Boys' Chorus of St. Willibrord's Church, Utrecht. A recording of the performance survives and was issued by Decca in 1960. On 9 March 1950, van Beinum conducted the work at the Royal Albert Hall with the London Philharmonic Orchestra and the London Philharmonic Choir. The American premiere was by the Boston Symphony Orchestra at Tanglewood in August 1950. In October 1950, Spring Symphony was performed at the Leeds Triennial Musical Festival with a choir of 100 boys.

== Structure and music ==
Spring Symphony is made up of four parts, which correspond to the movements of a conventional symphony: Allegro with slow introduction, slow movement, scherzo, and finale. Part I begins with the dark and mysterious "Shine Out", a poem to the sun. Several more songs follow, including "The Driving Boy", sung by the boys' choir, at times whistling, with tambourine. The second part has several solos and quiet choruses and references to the month of May. The third part looks forward to May and then to summer. The Finale, "London, to thee I do present", comes to a climax when the entire chorus joins in a wordless, full-throated waltz representing the May revellers fortified by wine and ale (borne out by some rather unexpected modulations). The climax of the movement is the moment when the children's voices, accompanied by unison French horns, re-enter the scene and sing the 13th century round "Sumer is icumen in". The simple tune, sung in 2/4 time over the unyielding 3/4 waltz of the rest of the ensemble, finally achieves dominance. Eventually the celebrations subside, and the Maylord then offers a final blessing with the proclamation: "And so, my friends, I cease."

The large orchestra includes triple woodwinds, two harps, and a large percussion section. Each song has its distinctive scoring, ranging from just first and second violins accompanying the tenor (Waters Above!) to full orchestra in the first and last songs. The last movement adds the call of a cow-horn, specifying a G, C, and F. The duration is given as 45 minutes.

=== Poems in the Spring Symphony ===
The poems (and authors) in the Spring Symphony are as follows:

=== Part 1 ===
1. Introduction: "Shine out" (Anonymous) (mixed chorus)
2. "The Merry Cuckoo" (Edmund Spenser) (tenor solo)
3. "Spring, the Sweet Spring" (Thomas Nashe) (soprano, alto and tenor soli, mixed chorus)
4. "The Driving Boy" (George Peele, John Clare) (soprano solo and boys' choir)
5. "The Morning Star" (John Milton) (mixed chorus)

=== Part 2 ===
6. "Welcome, Maids of Honour" (Robert Herrick) (alto solo)
7. "Waters Above!" (Henry Vaughan) (tenor solo)
8. "Out on the lawn I lie in bed" (W. H. Auden) (alto solo and mixed chorus)

=== Part 3 ===
9. "When will my May come?" (Richard Barnfield) (tenor solo)
10. "Fair and fair" (George Peele) (soprano and tenor soli)
11. "Sound the flute!" (William Blake) (male chorus, female chorus and boys' choir)

=== Part 4 ===
12. Finale: "London, to thee I do present" (Anon, closing words from The Knight of the Burning Pestle by Francis Beaumont) (soprano, alto and tenor soli, mixed chorus and boys' choir)
13. "Sumer is icumen in", simultaneously

== Discography ==
- Decca: Jo Vincent, Kathleen Ferrier, Peter Pears (vocal soloists); Concertgebouw Orchestra of Amsterdam, Netherlands Radio Choir, Boys' Chorus of St. Willibrord's Church, Utrecht; Eduard van Beinum (conductor; from archival Dutch radio recording of the premiere, 14 July 1949)
- Decca: Jennifer Vyvyan, Norma Procter, Peter Pears (vocal soloists); Orchestra and Chorus of the Royal Opera House, Chorus of Boys from Emanuel School, Wandsworth; Benjamin Britten (conductor)
- New York Philharmonic Editions: Jennifer Vyvyan, Regina Sarfaty, Richard Lewis; New York Philharmonic Orchestra, Boys' Choir from The Little Church Around the Corner, Boys' Choir from St. Paul's Church (Westfield, New Jersey, USA); Leonard Bernstein, conductor (live recording from May 1963)
- EMI Classics: Sheila Armstrong, Janet Baker, Robert Tear (vocal soloists); London Symphony Orchestra, London Symphony Chorus; St Clement Danes School Boys' Choir; André Previn (conductor)
- Chandos: Elizabeth Gale, Alfreda Hodgson, Martyn Hill (vocal soloists); London Symphony Orchestra, London Symphony Chorus, Southend Boys' Choir; Richard Hickox (conductor)
- Deutsche Grammophon: Alison Hagley, Catherine Robbin, John Mark Ainsley (vocal soloists), Philharmonia Orchestra, Salisbury Cathedral Choristers, Monteverdi Choir; Sir John Eliot Gardiner (conductor)
- LSO Live: Elizabeth Watts, Alice Coote, Allan Clayton (vocal soloists); London Symphony Orchestra, London Symphony Chorus, Tiffin Boys' Choir, Tiffin Children's Chorus, The Tiffin Girls' School Choir; Sir Simon Rattle (conductor)
