= Jo Vincent =

Dutch soprano (1898–1989)

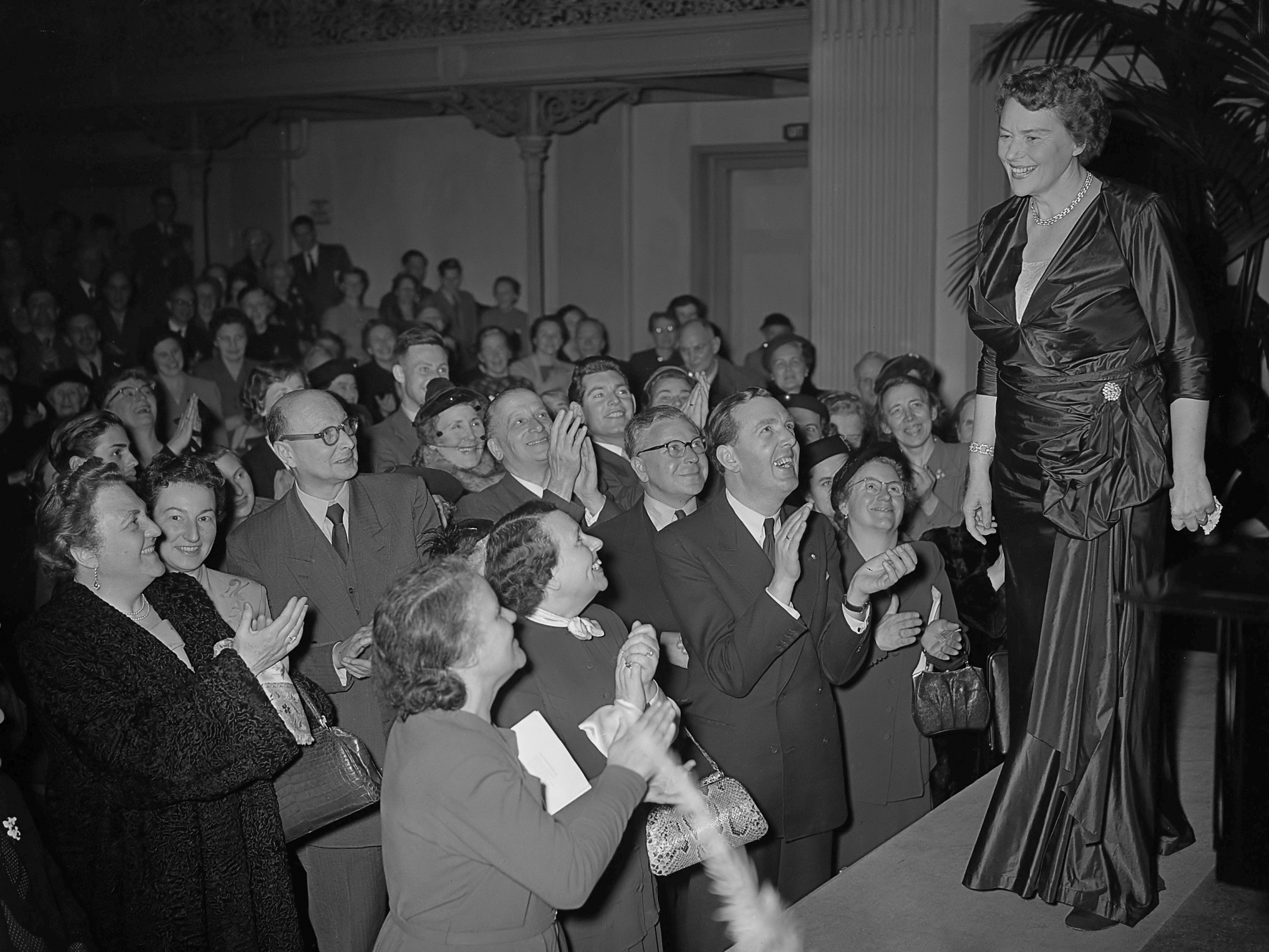
- Jo Vincent onstage in 1953
- Born: Johanna Maria Vincent; 6 March 1898
- Died: 28 November 1989 (aged 91)
- Occupation: Soprano

Johanna Maria Vincent (6 March 1898 – 28 November 1989) was a Dutch soprano who appeared mostly in oratorio and concert, and is internationally known. She appeared regularly with Willem Mengelberg and the Royal Concertgebouw Orchestra from 1924 to 1942, including annual concerts and a recording of Bach's St Matthew Passion. She participated in the world premiere of Benjamin Britten's Spring Symphony, with Kathleen Ferrier and Peter Pears. After retiring, she taught at the Haarlem Conservatory.

== Life ==
Johanna Vincent was born in Amsterdam, the daughter of the organist, piano teacher and carillonneur Jacob Vincent, and Geertruida Johanna Meijer. At age nine, she joined the children's choir of Catharina van Rennes. She studied to be a voice teacher, graduating with a diploma in 1919. She gave singing lessons to pay for studying voice with Cornélie van Zanten.

Her first public concert was in Assendelft in 1920. She first appeared with the Royal Concertgebouw Orchestra in 1923, conducted by Cornelis Dopper. Vincent focused on a repertoire of oratorio, especially Bach's Passions, and lieder by Johann Sebastian Bach, Gustav Mahler, Franz Schubert and Hugo Wolf. Vincent sang frequently in concerts with Willem Mengelberg and the Concertgebouw Orchestra, first in 1924 in a concert with songs by G. H. G. von Brucken Fock, and Mahler's Eighth Symphony, which was broadcast. From 1932, she was the soprano soloist in Bach's St Matthew Passion, which Mengelberg had conducted annually on Palm Sunday since 1899. She appeared in the 1939 early recording of this Passion, which featured Karl Erb as the Evangelist, Willem Ravelli as the Vox Christi, and other soloists Ilona Durigo, Louis van Tulder and Hermann Schey. Their concerts ended in 1942, due to the German occupation.

Vincent occasionally appeared internationally, such as in Paris in 1929, performing as Marguérite in La damnation de Faust by Berlioz, conducted by Pierre Monteux, in Vienna in 1932 where Mengelberg conducted Mahler's Fourth Symphony, and also in Vienna in 1936 in Beethoven's Missa solemnis. Her only operatic role was the Countess in Mozart's Le nozze di Figaro, performed in 1939 in Scheveningen. In London, she appeared at The Proms several times between 1939 and 1948, then performed in Queen's Hall, conducted by Henry Wood.

On 14 July 1949, she took part in the world premiere of Benjamin Britten's Spring Symphony at the Concertgebouw as part of the Holland Festival, with contralto Kathleen Ferrier, tenor Peter Pears, and conducted by Eduard van Beinum. A review in New Statesman and Nation dated 23 July 1949 stated that Vincent "excelled herself" in bird songs. A recording of the first performance was first issued by Decca in August 1994.

Vincent retired in 1953, after which she gave occasional performances. After retirement, she taught singing from 1955 to 1956 at the Haarlem Conservatory. During her retirement in Roquebrune-Cap-Martin, near Monaco, Vincent continued to teach privately. Around 1970, shortly after fellow Dutch soprano Suzanna Rosander had completed her studies at the Académie Rainier III in Monaco, the two met following a concert featuring the Monte-Carlo Philharmonic Orchestra. Recognizing Rosander's musicality but noting technical difficulties, Vincent offered to mentor her. They worked together daily for a year, making Rosander her final disciple. Jo Vincent died on November 28, 1989, at the hospital in Monaco.

== Recordings ==
"Ave Maria" (Bach/Gounod), arrangement for violin and piano (1st time) and voice, violin and piano (2nd time), performed prior to 1930

Vincent's voice appears on several recordings:

- Jo Vincent CD1
- Jo Vincent, Philips Legendary Voices. CDs
- Jo Vincent, The Great Dutch Soprano. CDs
- Jo Vincent Kwartet - Psalmen en Gezangen / Liederen van Joh. de Heer
- Jo Vincent - Passion, Oratorio & Arias, 2 CD's
- Mahler: Symphony No. 2 "Resurrection", Kathleen Ferrier, Otto Klemperer
- Mahler: Symphony No. 4, Mengelberg
