= Hermann Schey =

Dutch bass-baritone (1895–1981)

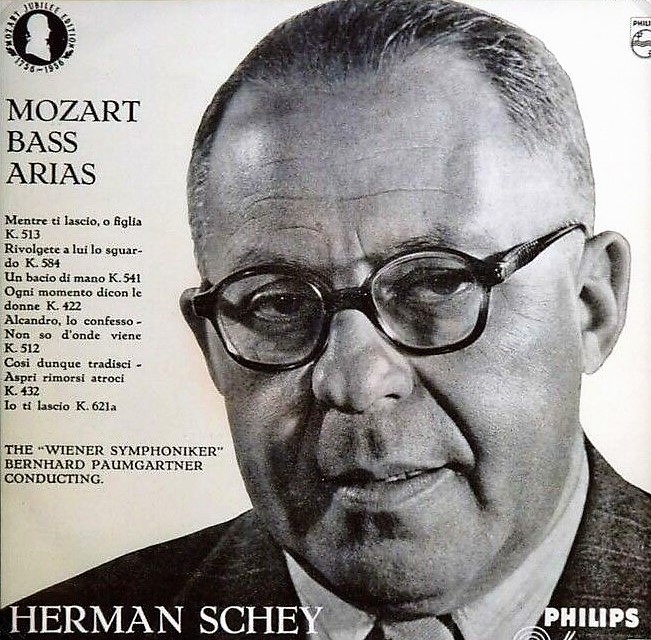
- Hermann Schey on the cover of a recording of Mozart bass arias by Philips Records, 1956
- Born: 8 November 1895; Bunzlau, Province of Silesia, Germany
- Died: 21 August 1981 (aged 85); Uerikon, Switzerland
- Education: Hochschule für Musik und Theater München
- Occupations: Classical bass-baritone singer; Academic voice teacher

Hermann Schey (8 November 1895 – 21 August 1981) was a German-born Dutch bass-baritone and voice teacher. He performed internationally and recorded, especially works by Johann Sebastian Bach but also world premieres.

== Life and career ==
Born in Bunzlau, province of Silesia (now Bolesławiec, Poland), Schey received his musical education in Berlin at the Hochschule für Musik from 1913 to 1915 with Henry von Dulong. In 1915, he was drafted and could only continue his studies after the war. Since 1922, Schey worked in Berlin as a concert and oratorio singer. He was especially admired for his Bach interpretations.

Concert tours brought him great success in European music centres. In 1925, he appeared in Schönberg's Gurre-Lieder at the Tonhalle Düsseldorf, conducted by Georg Lennart Schneevoigt. In 1929, he sang Mahler's Kindertotenlieder in Amsterdam with the Royal Concertgebouw conducted by Willem Mengelberg, and then returned every year to perform in Bach's St Matthew Passion conducted by Mengelberg. The performances were recorded in 1936 (excerpts) and in 1939, with Karl Erb as the Evangelist, Willem Ravelli as the vox Christi, Jo Vincent, Ilona Durigo and Louis van Tulder.

In 1930, he undertook a major tour to Poland, Russia and the Balkan states, in 1932 he gave concerts in Paris and in 1933 in Zurich. He gave the world premieres of several Lieder by Othmar Schoeck, and in 1930 he sang the bass solo in the world premiere of Hans Pfitzner's cantata Das dunkle Reich in Berlin. As a Jew, he emigrated to the Netherlands in 1934 and became professor at the Conservatorium van Amsterdam in 1936. When the Netherlands were occupied by the German army in 1940, he had to stay in hiding until the end of the war.

After the Second World War, he resumed his career and took part in the Holland Festival. Concert tours took him to Germany, England, Austria and Switzerland. In 1968, he undertook a tour to Israel and performed at the Abu Ghosh Vocal Music Festival. He also continued working as a singing teacher. He spent his retirement in Switzerland. Schey died aged 85 in Uerikon near Zürich.

== Recordings ==
- Early recordings, Odeon
- Schubert: Winterreise, with pianist Marguerite Reyners
- Recordings on labels DGG, Christschall, Tri-Ergon, MMS and Concert Hall, including Bach's Magnificat
- Recordings of Bach cantatas and other vocal works
