= Fred W. Mast =

Swiss psychologist

Fred W. Mast is a full professor of Psychology at the University of Bern in Switzerland, specializing in mental imagery, sensorimotor processing, and visual perception. He directs the Cognitive Psychology, Perception, and Research Methods Section at the Department of Psychology of the University of Bern.

== Early life and education ==
Fred Mast was born and raised in Wil (Eastern Switzerland) and studied Psychology, Philosophy, and Neurophysiology at the University of Zurich where he also obtained his PhD in 1995 working with Professor Norbert Bischof. He taught Perception, Cognition, Psychophysics, and Neuroscience at the University of Zurich and at the Federal Institute of Technology (ETHZ). In 1998 he moved to the US and became a research associate at the Department of Psychology at Harvard University working with Professor Stephen Kosslyn and had a part-time appointment at the Massachusetts Institute of Technology (MIT). He returned to Switzerland in 2002 to join the Faculty of Arts at the University of Zurich and obtained his Habilitation ("venia legendi") a year later. In 2005 he became a full professor for Cognitive Psychology at the University of Lausanne (2005-2008). He was also the responsible coordinator for Cognitive Psychology teaching at the Swiss Federal Institute of Technology in Lausanne (EPFL). Since 2008, he is a full professor of Psychology at the University of Bern. He was Head of Department (2012-2014), Dean of the Faculty of Human Sciences (2015-2017), and currently co-directing with Professor Claudio Bassetti the Interfaculty Research Cooperation „Decoding Sleep“.

Fred Mast is married and has two sons. He lives with his family in Pully, Switzerland.

== Selected publications ==
- Mast, F., Kosslyn, S.M. & Berthoz. A. (1999). Visual mental imagery interferes with allocentric orientation judgements. NeuroReport, 10, 3549–3553.
- Mast, F.W., Berthoz, A. & Kosslyn, S.M. (2001). Mental imagery of visual motion modifies the perception of roll vection stimulation. Perception, 30, 945–957.
- Mast, F.W. & Kosslyn, S.M. (2002). Eye movements during visual mental imagery. Trends in Cognitive Sciences, 6, 271–272.
- Mast, F.W. & Kosslyn, S.M. (2002). Visual mental images can be ambiguous: Insights from individual differences in spatial transformation abilities. Cognition, 86, 57–70.
- Mast, F.W., Ganis, G., Christie, S. & Kosslyn, S.M. (2003). Four types of visual mental imagery processing in upright and tilted observers. Cognitive Brain Research, 17, 238–247.
- Mast, F.W., Newby, N.J. & Young, L.R. (2003). Sensorimotor aspects of high-speed artificial gravity: II. The effect of head position on illusory self-motion. Journal of Vestibular Research, 12, 283–289.
- Mast, F.W. & Zaltman, G. (2005). A behavioral window on the mind of the market: An application of the response time paradigm. Brain Research Bulletin, 67, 422–427.
- Mast, F.W. (2005). Mental images: Always present, never there. Brain and Behavioral Sciences, 28, 769–770.
- Mast, F.W., Merfeld, D.M. & Kosslyn, S.M. (2006). Visual mental imagery during caloric vestibular stimulation. Neuropsychologia, 44, 101–109.
- Lobmaier, J.S. & Mast, F.W. (2007). The Thatcher illusion: Rotating the viewer instead of the picture. Perception, 36, 537–546.
- Lobmaier, J.S. & Mast, F.W. (2008). Perception of novel faces: The parts have it! Perception, 55, 47–53.
- Grabherr L., Nicoucar K., Mast F.W. & Merfeld D.M. (2008). Vestibular thresholds for yaw rotation about an earth-vertical axis as a function of frequency. Experimental Brain Research, 186, 677–681.
- Lobmaier J.S. & Mast, F.W. (2008) Face imagery is based on featural representations. Experimental Psychology, 55, 47–53.
- Lobmaier J.S. Klaver P, Loenneker T, Martin E, & Mast F,.W. (2008). Featural and configural face processing strategies: Evidence from an fMRI study. NeuroReport, 19, 287–291.
- Reisen, N., Hoffrage, U. & Mast, F.W. (2008). Identifying decision strategies in a consumer choice situation. Judgment and Decision Making, 4(8), 641–658.
- Frick, A., Daum, M., Walser, S. & Mast, F.W. (2009). Motor processes in children's mental rotation. Journal of Cognition and Development. 10, 18–40.
- Bombari, D., Mast, F.W. & Lobmaier, J.S. (2009). Featural, configural and holistic face processing strategies evoke different scan patterns. Perception, 38, 1508–1521.
- Tartaglia, E., Bamert, L., Mast, F.W. & Herzog, M. (2009). Human perceptual learning by mental imagery. Current Biology, 19, 1–5.
- Lobmaier, J.S., Mast, F.W. & Hecht, H. (2010). For the mind's eye the world is two-dimensional. Psychonomic Bulletin & Review, 17, 36–40.
- Lobmaier, J.S., Bölte, J., Mast, F.W. & Dobel, C. (2010). Configural and featural processing in humans with congenital prosopagnosia. Advances in Cognitive Psychology, 6, 23–34.
- Wissmath, B., Stricker, D., Weibel, D., Siegenthaler, E. & Mast, F.W. (2010). The illusion of being located in dynamic virtual environments. Can eye movement parameters predict spatial presence ? Journal of Eye Movement Research, 3(5):2, 1–8.
- Martarelli, C.S. & Mast, F.W. (2011). Preschool children's eye movements during pictorial recall. British Journal of Developmental Psychology, 29, 425–436.
- Weibel, D., Wissmath, B. & Mast, F.W. (2011). The role of cognitive appraisal in media-induced presence and emotions. Cognition and Emotion, 25 (7), 1291–1298.
- Grabherr, L., Cuffel, C., Guyot, J.-P. & Mast, F.W. (2011). Mental transformation abilities in patients with unilateral and bilateral vestibular loss. Experimental Brain Research, 209, 205–214.
- Wissmath, B., Weibel, D., Schmutz, J. & Mast, F.W. (2011). Being present in more than one place at a time? Patterns of mental self-localization. Consciousness and Cognition, 20, 1808–1815.
- Hartmann, M., Falconer, C. & Mast, F.W. (2011). Imagined paralysis impairs embodied spatial transformations. Cognitive Neuroscience, 2, 155–162.
- Hartmann, M., Grabherr, L. & Mast, F.W. (2012). Moving along the mental number line: Interactions between whole-body motion and numerical cognition. Journal of Experimental Psychology: Human Perception and Performance, 38, 1416-1427
- Lopez, C., Bieri, C., Preuss, N. & Mast, F.W. (2012). Tactile and vestibular mechanisms underlying ownership for body parts: a non-visual variant of the rubber hand illusion. Neuroscience Letters, 511, 120–124.
- Falconer, C. & Mast, F.W. (2012). Balancing the mind: Vestibular induced facilitation of egocentric mental transformations. Experimental Psychology, 28, 1–8.
- Lopez, C., Blanke, O. & Mast, F.W. (2012). The human vestibular cortex revealed by coordinate-based activation likelihood estimation meta-analysis. Journal of Neuroscience, 212, 159–179.
- Lopez, C., Schreyer, H.-M., Preuss, N. & Mast, F.W. (2012). Vestibular stimulation modifies the body schema. Neuropsychologia, 50 (8), 1830–1837.
- Lobmaier, J.S., Hartmann, M., Volz, A.J. & Mast, F.W. (2012). Emotional expression affects the accuracy of gaze perception. Motivation and Emotion, 8. 573–577.
- Tartaglia, E., Bamert, L., Herzog, M. & Mast, F.W. (2012). Perceptual learning of motion discrimination by mental imagery. Journal of Vision, 12(6), 1-10.
- Bombari, D., Mora, B., Schaefer, S.C., Mast, F.W. & Lehr, H.-A. (2012). What was I thinking? Eye-tracking experiments underscore the bias that architecture exerts on nuclear grading in prostate cancer, PLoS ONE 7(5): e38023. doi:10.1371/journal.pone.0038023
- Hartmann, M., Farkas, R. & Mast, F.W. (2012). Self-motion perception influences number processing: Evidence from a parity task. Cognitive Processing, 13, 189–192.
- Hartmann, M. & Mast, F.W. (2012). Moving along the mental time line influences the processing of future related words. Consciousness and Cognition, 21, 1558–62.
- Mast, F.W., Tartaglia, E. & Herzog, M. (2012). New percepts via mental imagery? Frontiers in Psychology, 3:360. doi: 10.3389/fpsyg.2012.00360.
- Lopez. C., Falconer, C. & Mast, F.W. (2012). Being moved by the self and others: influence of empathy on self-motion perception. PLoS ONE 8(1): e48293. doi:10.1371/journal.pone.0048293.
- Martarelli, C.S. & Mast, F.W. (2013). Is it real or is it fiction. Children's bias toward reality. Journal of Cognition and Development, 14, 141–153.
- Hartmann, M., Furrer, S., Merfeld, D.M., Herzog, M. & Mast, F.W (2013). Self-motion perception training: Thresholds improve in the light but not in the dark, Experimental Brain Research, 226, 231–240.
- Martarelli, C.S. & Mast, F.W. (2013). Eye movements during long-term pictorial recall. Psychological Research, 77(3), 303–309.
- Golle, J., Lisibach, S., Mast, F.W., & Lobmaier, J.S. (2013). Sweet puppies and cute babies: Perceptual adaptation to babyfacedness transfers across species. PLoS One, 8(3): e58248. doi:10.1371/journal.pone.0058248
- Bombari, D., Schmid, P.C., Schmid Mast, M., Birri, S., Mast, F.W. & Lobmaier, J.S. (2013). Emotion recognition: The role of featural and configural face information. Quarterly Journal of Experimental Psychology, 66. 12, 2426-2442 doi: 10.1080/17470218.2013.789065
- Preuss, N., Harris, L. & Mast, F.W. (2013). Allocentric visual cues influence mental transformation of bodies. Journal of Vision, 13(12):14, 1-10.
- Preuss, N., Hasler, G. & Mast, F.W. (2014). Caloric vestibular stimulation modulates affective control and mood. Brain Stimulation. DOI: 10.1016/j.brs.2013.09.003
