= Lily Reiff =

Lily Sertorius Bamberger Reiff (21 June 1866 - 8 May 1958) was a German composer and pianist who spent much of her life in Switzerland. A patron of the arts as well as a musician, she helped found Switzerland’s first chamber orchestra. Her music was composed under the name Lily Bamberger Sertorius through opus 11 and later under the name Lily Reiff.

== Biography ==
Reiff was born in Bamberg, Germany. She studied at the Music Academy in Munich for two years before moving to Weimar in 1883 to study with Franz Liszt for a year. She also studied with Ludwig Thuille in Munich and with Max Conrad and Friedrich Hegar in Zurich. As a student, Reiff presented concerts for charity with the violinist Adolf Busch, who was a friend of her family.

Reiff toured as a concert pianist from 1885 to 1888, when she married professor Eugen Bamberger. In 1891, she married the manufacturer and cellist Hermann Reiff.

The Reiffs settled in Zurich and hosted many artistic visitors at their home at Mythenstrasse 24, including Alexander and Irma Schaichet, who founded the Kammerorchester Zürich with help from the Reiffs; singer Maria Stader; composers Richard Strauss and Ingolf Dahl; and author Thomas Mann. Kammerorchester Zürich premiered Lily Reiff’s composition Drei Reigen for Harp and String Orchestra in October 1924. Thomas Mann modeled the characters Herr and Frau Reiff in chapter XXXIX of Doctor Faustus on Hermann and Lily Reiff.

The Reiffs hosted weekly tea recitals at their home, where young musicians performed and networked. They also managed a concert series at the Lilienberg retirement home in Affoltern am Albis, sometimes performing themselves. A 1951 Zürcher Woche magazine profile of Reiff focused on her patronage of the arts and described her as a "friend of the elderly" and "helper of the young."

Reiff’s papers are archived at the Zentralbibliothek Zürich. Her compositions were published by Hug & Co. Musikverlag and Otto Halbreiter, and include:

=== Chamber ===
- Drei Stucke (violin and piano)
- Funf Stucke (cello and piano)
- Kleines Kirchenstuck undz wei Weihnachstmelodien, opus 9 (cello and piano)
- Suite (flute and piano)

=== Opera ===
- Das Verkaufte Lied
- Maerchen Oper

=== Orchestra ===
- Drei Reigen (harp and string orchestra)
- Praeludium und Walzer
- Spanish Procession

=== Piano ===
- Drei Tierstucke
- Kleine Variationen

=== Vocal ===
- “Das Verkaufte Lied”
- Drei Lieder (text by Else Lasker-Schuler)
- Fruhling der Seele, opus 13
- “Lieder, opus 10”
- “Lieder vom Feierabend, opus 11” (text by Carl Friedrich Weigand)
- “Pucks Liebeslied” (text by Rudolf Lothar)
- “Siehst du Im See, opus 12”
- “Weil ich jedn Abend Einsam Bin” (text by Carl Friedrich Weigand)
