= List of mayors of Wil =

Coat of arms of Wil

This is a list of mayors of the Wil, Canton of St. Gallen, Switzerland. The mayor of Wil (Stadtpräsident, earlier: Stadtammann) chairs the five-member city council (Stadtrat).

Mayor (Stadtpräsident/Stadtammann) of Wil
Term	Mayor	Lifespan	Party	Notes
1905–1941	Ernst Wild	(1873–1943)		
1941–1964	Alois Löhrer	(1895–1965)		
1965–1976	Laurenz Fäh	(1910–1995)		
1977–1992	Hans Wechsler	(1930–2010)		
1992–2000	Josef Hartmann	(1942–2009)	CVP/PDC	Father of Susanne Hartmann
2001–2012	Bruno Gähwiler	(born 1947)	CVP/PDC	
2013–2020	Susanne Hartmann	(born 1970)	CVP/PDC	
2021–present	Hans Mäder	(born 1958)	CVP/PDC	
