= Wil =

City in St. Gallen, Switzerland

- Municipality
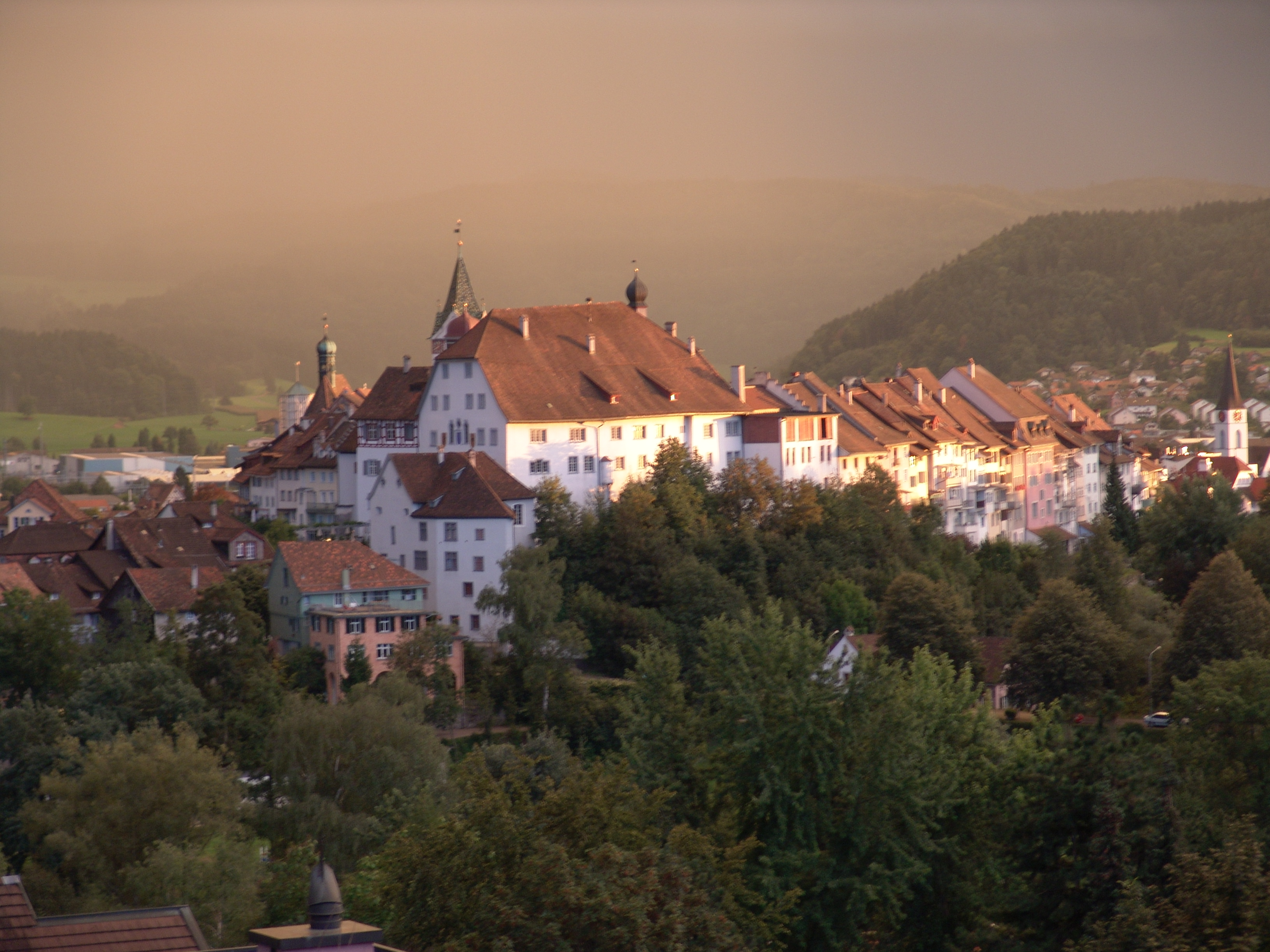
- Historic town center of Wil (2004)

- Coat of arms
- Location of Wil
- Location within Switzerland Location within Canton of St. Gallen
- Coordinates: 47°28′N 9°03′E
- Country: Switzerland
- Canton: St. Gallen
- District: Wahlkreis Wil

Government
  - Executive: Stadtrat with 5 members
  - Mayor: Stadtpräsident (list); Hans Mäder Die Mitte (as of January 2021)
  - Parliament: Stadtparlament with 40 members

Area
  - Total: 7.62 km^{2} (2.94 sq mi)
- Elevation: 571 m (1,873 ft)

Population (December 2020)
  - Total: 24,132
  - Density: 3,170/km^{2} (8,200/sq mi)
- Time zone: UTC+01:00 (CET)
  - Summer (DST): UTC+02:00 (CEST)
- Postal code: 9500
- SFOS number: 3427
- ISO 3166 code: CH-SG
- Surrounded by: Bronschhofen, Jonschwil, Münchwilen (TG), Rickenbach (TG), Sirnach (TG), Uzwil (SG), Wilen (TG), Zuzwil
- Twin towns: Dobrzen Wielki (Poland)
- Website: www.stadtwil.ch

Wil (German pronunciation: [viːl]) is a town and political municipality in the canton of St. Gallen in Switzerland. It has a small-town character and is an important center for the west of the canton, lower Toggenburg and Hinterthurgau. Wil had a population of 25,176 by the end of 2024. With 74,550 inhabitants (according to the FSO), the agglomeration of Wil is the second-largest conurbation in Eastern Switzerland. The former political municipality of Bronschhofen has been part of the town of Wil since 1 January 2013. For more than 500 years, the prince-abbots of St. Gallen resided in the "Hof" of Wil; Wil is also called "Abbots Town" ("Äbtestadt") and is the third largest city in the canton of St. Gallen, after St. Gallen and Rapperswil-Jona.

In 1984, Wil was awarded the Wakker Prize for the development and preservation of its architectural heritage.

== Geography ==
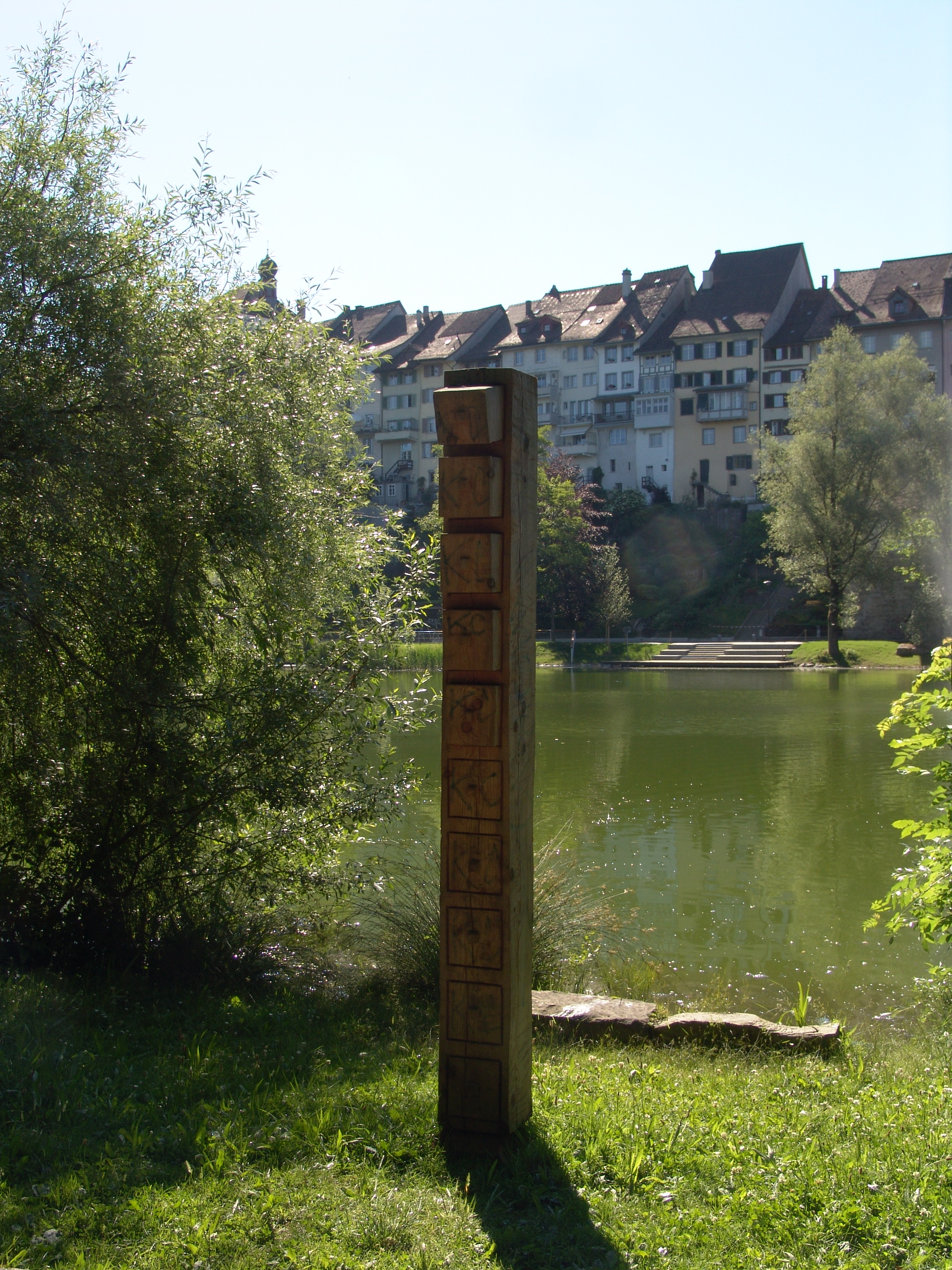
Wiler Stadtweier (2005)

Aerial view of Wil (1953)

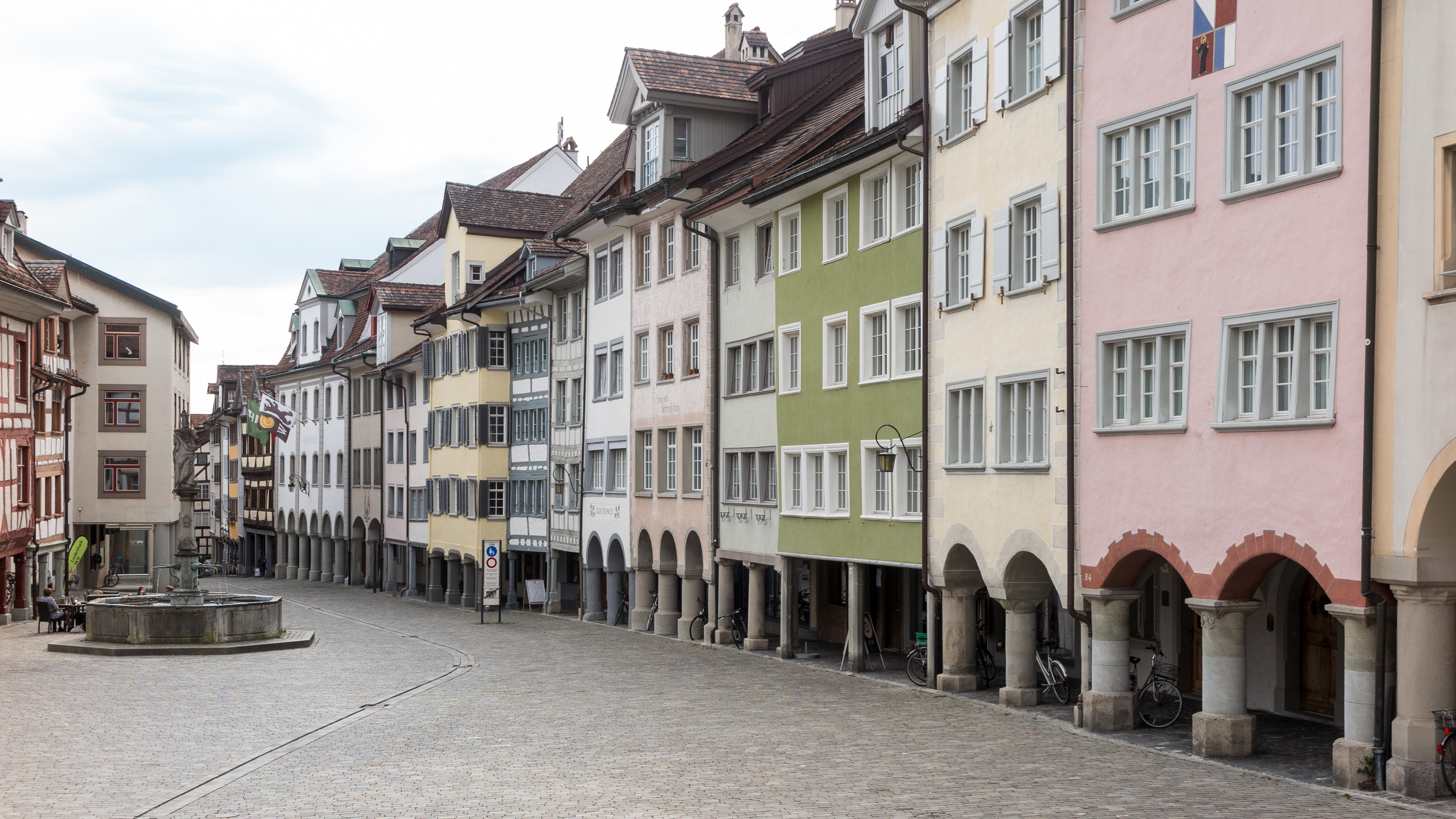
Market Street in Wil SG

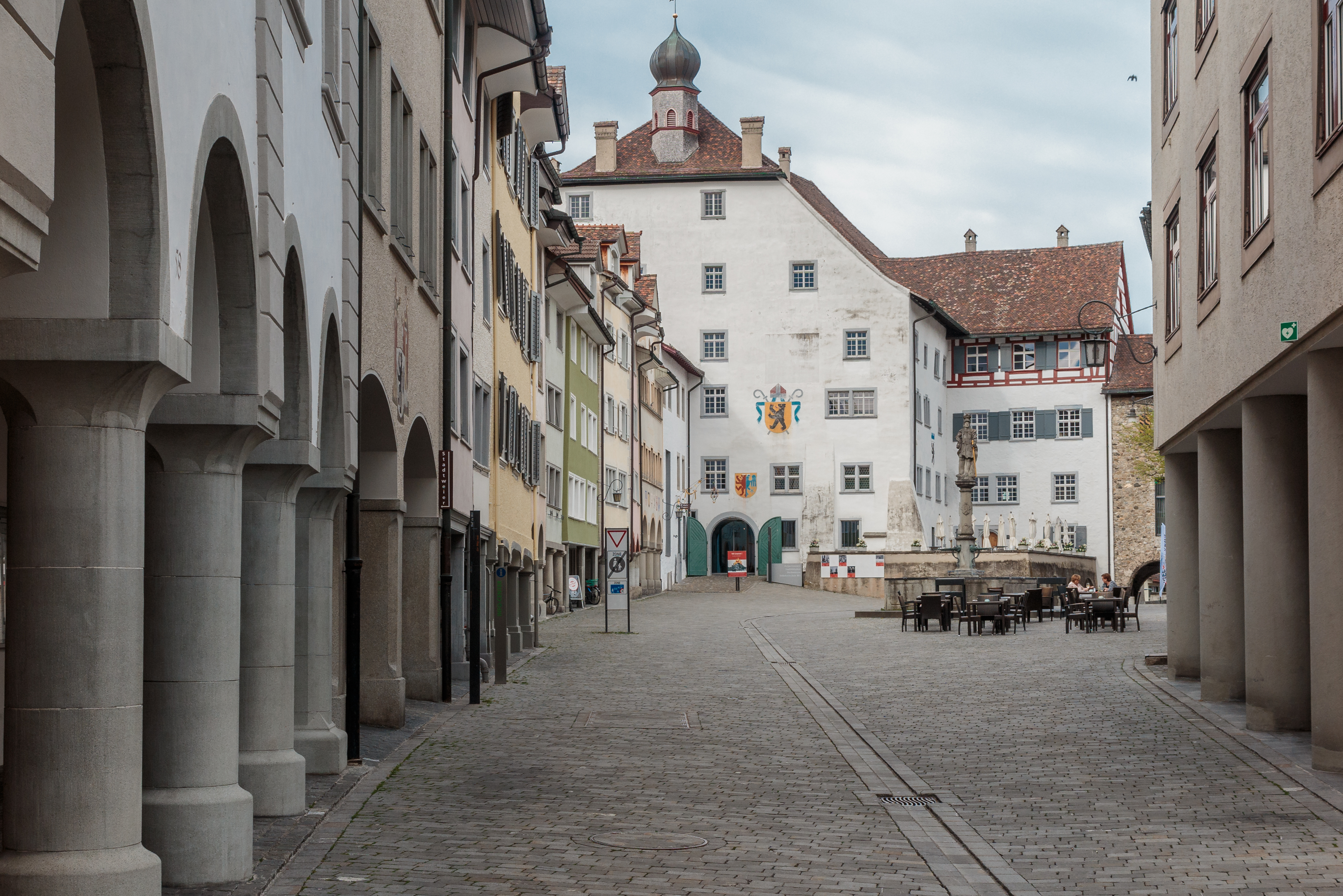
Market Street and Prince-Abbot's Court

Since the merger in 2013, Wil now has an area of 20.82 km^{2} (8.04 sq mi). Based on the 2004/09 survey, but including the post-merger area, about 50.1% of the total land is used for agricultural purposes, while 18.9% is forested. Of the rest of the land, 30.1% is settled (buildings or roads) and 0.9% is unproductive land. During the two decades from 1979/85 to 2004/09, the amount of land that is settled has increased by 111 ha (270 acres) and the agricultural land has decreased almost by the same ratio, by 113 ha (280 acres).

Before the merger, Wil had an area, as of 2006, of 7.6 km^{2} (2.9 sq mi). Of this area, 32.1% is used for agricultural purposes, while 13.9% is forested. Of the rest of the land, 53.4% is settled (buildings or roads) and the remainder (0.7%) is non-productive (rivers or lakes).

The former municipality of Bronschhofen had an area, as of 2006, of 13.2 km^{2} (5.1 sq mi). Of this area, 65.3% is used for agricultural purposes, while 22.1% is forested. Of the remaining land, 12% is settled (buildings or roads) and the remainder (0.5%) is non-productive (rivers or lakes). It consisted of the villages of Bronschhofen and Rossrüti as well as the hamlets of Maugwil, Trungen and Dreibrunnen.

== Coat of arms ==
The blazon of the municipal coat of arms is Per pale Argent a Bear rampant Sable langued and in his virility Gules and Sable, a Snail shell Or above a letter W of the First.

== Demographics ==
Wil has a population (as of December 2020) of 24,132. As of 2013, 27.3% of the population are resident foreign nationals. Over the last 3 years (2010–2013) the population has changed at a rate of 3.13%. In 2000, of the foreign population, 272 were from Germany, 776 were from Italy, 1,876 were from ex-Yugoslavia, 135 were from Austria, 309 were from Turkey, and 578 from another country. The birth rate in the municipality, in 2013, was 11.2 while the death rate was 7.5 per thousand residents.

Before the merger, in 2011, Bronschhofen had a population of 4,654.

Most of the population (as of 2000) speaks German (85.1%), with Albanian being the second most common (4.5%) and Italian being the third most common language (3.0%). Of the Swiss national languages (as of 2000), 13,943 speak German, 60 people speak French, 488 people speak Italian, and 26 people speak Romansh.

As of 2013, children and teenagers (0–19 years old) make up 19.7% of the population, while adults (20–64 years old) are 62.6% and seniors (over 64 years old) make up 17.7%.

In 2000 there were 2,829 people (or 17.3% of the population) who were living alone in a private dwelling. There were 4,034 (or 24.6%) people who were part of a couple (married or otherwise committed) without children, and 7,421 (or 45.3%) who were part of a couple with children. There were 954 (or 5.8%) people who lived in single parent home, while there were 79 people who were adult children living with one or both parents, 90 people who lived in a household made up of relatives, 174 who lived in a household made up of unrelated people, and 811 who are either institutionalized or live in another type of collective housing.

In the 2007 federal election the most popular party was the SVP which received 31.7% of the vote. The next three most popular parties were the CVP (21.9%), the SP (14.9%) and the FDP (12.5%).

In Wil, about 69.2% of the population (between age 25-64) have completed either non-mandatory upper secondary education or additional higher education (either university or a Fachhochschule). Out of the total population in Wil, as of 2000, the highest education level completed by 3,538 people (21.6% of the population) was Primary, while 6,179 (37.7%) have completed their secondary education, 2,158 (13.2%) have attended a Tertiary school, and 818 (5.0%) are not in school. The remainder did not answer this question.

== Heritage sites of national significance ==
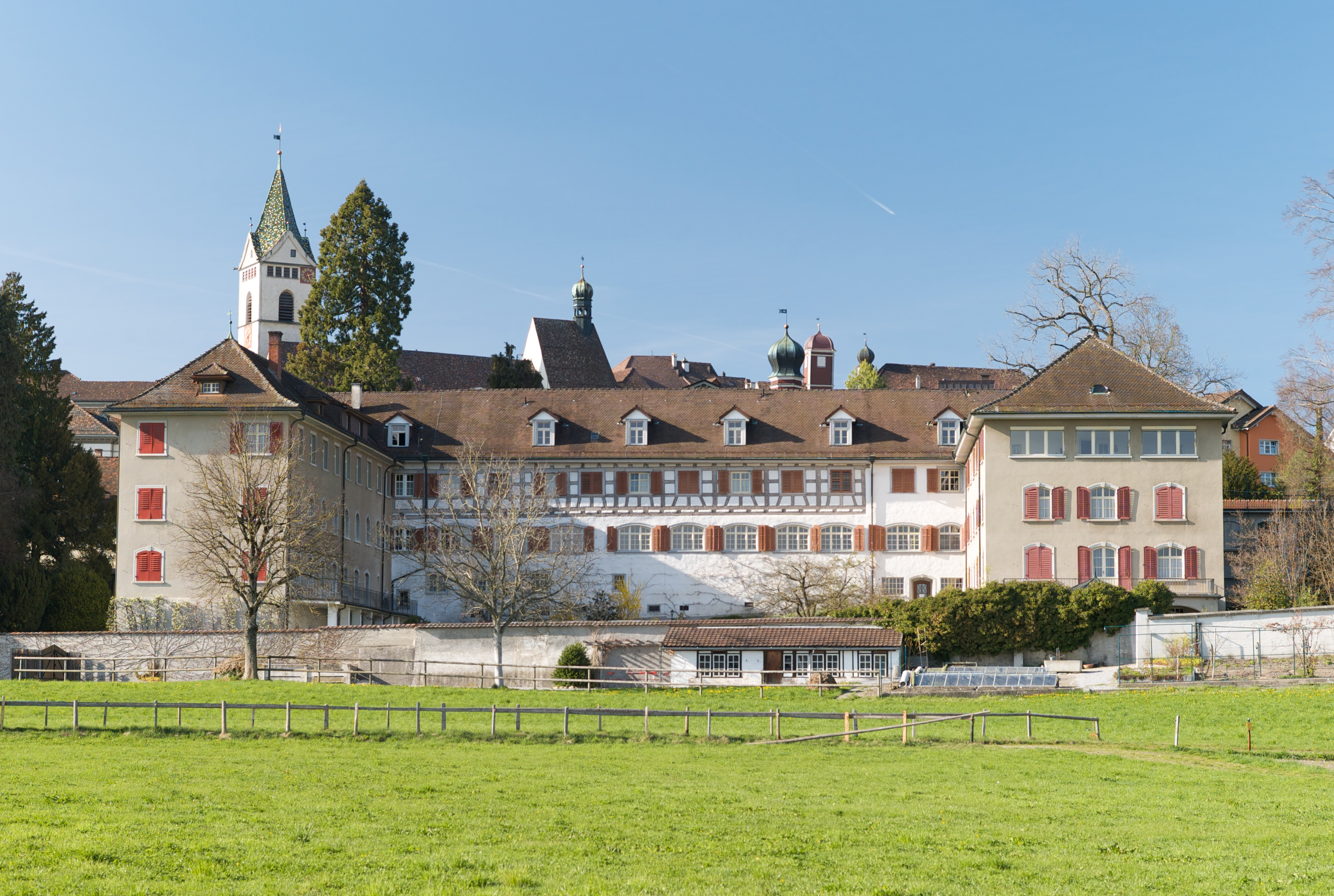
St. Catherine's Dominican Monastery, Wil (2012)

The Baronenhaus at Marktgasse 73, the Dominican Abbey of St. Katharina, the Hof (the former seat of the Prince-abbot) and the pilgrimage church Maria Dreibrunnen are listed as Swiss heritage sites of national significance.

The old town center of Wil is designated as part of the Inventory of Swiss Heritage Sites.

== Transport ==
It is a railway node, being located on the train line from Zürich-Winterthur to St. Gallen and connected with lines to Frauenfeld, Weinfelden-Konstanz and Wattwil - Nesslau (Toggenburg) or Rapperswil.

== Sport ==
The soccer club FC Wil play in the Swiss Challenge League.

== Economy ==
As of 2012, there were a total of 14,138 people employed in the municipality. Of these, a total of 163 people worked in 54 businesses in the primary economic sector. The secondary sector employed 3,213 workers in 247 separate businesses. Finally, the tertiary sector provided 10,762 jobs in 1,456 businesses. In 2013 a total of 2.0% of the population received social assistance.

As of 2000 there were 3,873 residents who worked in the municipality, while 4,695 residents worked outside Wil and 6,368 people commuted into the municipality for work.

== Religion ==
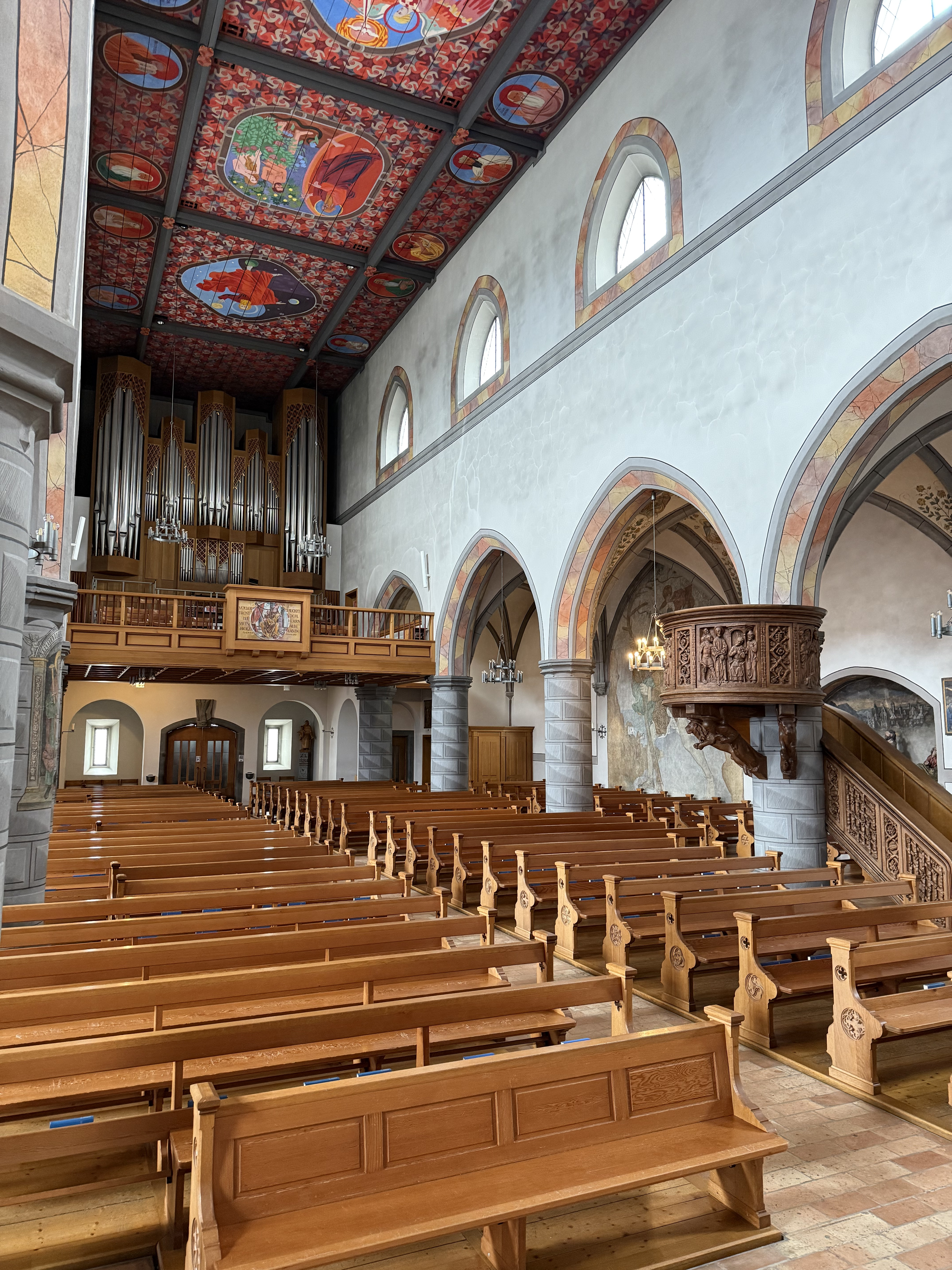
Stadtkirche St. Nikolaus, Wil (2025)

From the 2000 census, 8,817 or 53.8% are Roman Catholic, while 3,561 or 21.7% belonged to the Swiss Reformed Church. Of the rest of the population, there are 6 individuals (or about 0.04% of the population) who belong to the Christian Catholic faith, there are 473 individuals (or about 2.89% of the population) who belong to the Orthodox Church, and there are 265 individuals (or about 1.62% of the population) who belong to another Christian church. There are 10 individuals (or about 0.06% of the population) who are Jewish, and 1,433 (or about 8.74% of the population) who are Islamic. There are 116 individuals (or about 0.71% of the population) who belong to another church (not listed on the census), 1,138 (or about 6.94% of the population) belong to no church, are agnostic or atheist, and 573 individuals (or about 3.50% of the population) did not answer the question.

== Crime ==
In 2014 the crime rate, of the over 200 crimes listed in the Swiss Criminal Code (running from murder, robbery and assault to accepting bribes and election fraud), in Wil was 62.9 per thousand residents. This rate is about one and a half times greater than the cantonal rate, but very similar to the national rate. During the same period, the rate of drug crimes was 10.2 per thousand residents and the rate of violations of immigration, visa and work permit laws was 3 per thousand. Both of which were very close to the national rate.

== Mayor ==
On 1 January 2013, Susanne Hartmann became the first female mayor not only of Wil-Bronschhofen but in the entire canton of St. Gallen. Hartmann announced her candidacy in April 2012. Despite all forecasts the result of the elections was a landslide victory for Susanne Hartmann.

== Notable people ==
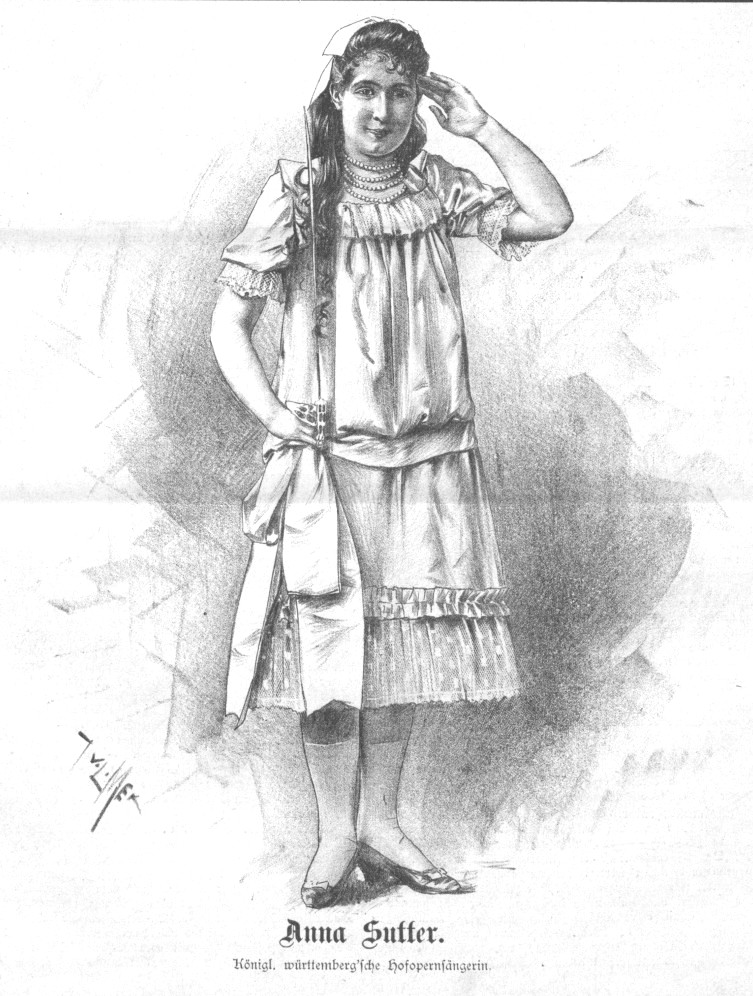
Anna Sutter (1894)

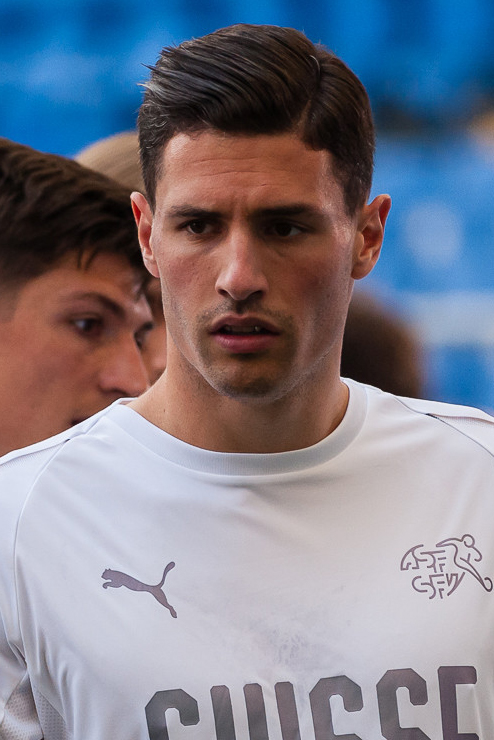
Fabian Schär (2018)

- Anna Sutter (1871 in Wil – 1910), operatic soprano.
- Nikolaus Senn (1926–2014), former co-director of the Schweizerische Bankgesellschaft.
- Kurt Widmer (1940 in Wil – 2023), baritone and voice teacher.
- Yvonne Gilli (born 1957), physician and politician, lives in Wil.
- Karin Keller-Sutter (born 1963), politician, elected to the Swiss Federal Council in 2018, spent her childhood in Wil.
- Renato Tosio (born 1964 in Wil), retired professional ice hockey goaltender.
- Alex Zülle (born 1968 in Wil), former professional road bicycle racer.
- Fred W. Mast (born ca.1968 in Wil), professor of Psychology at the University of Bern, specializing in mental imagery.
- Martin Welzel (born 1972), musician, principal organist at the Stadtkirche St. Nikolaus, lives in Wil.
- Daniel Imhof (born 1977 in Wil), a retired Canadian soccer player, last played for St. Gallen.
- Lukas Reimann (born 1982), conservative politician, lives in Wil.
- Daniel Sereinig (born 1982 in Wil), footballer with about 250 club caps.
- Nicole Graf (born 1985 in Wil), figure skater, which competes in ladies singles.
- Fabian Schär (born 1991 in Wil), footballer, who plays for Newcastle United F.C., with over 300 club appearances and 86 caps for Switzerland.
- Stefan Küng (born 1993 in Wil), world champion in cycling.
