= Friedrich Hegar =

Swiss composer, conductor and violinist (1841–1927)

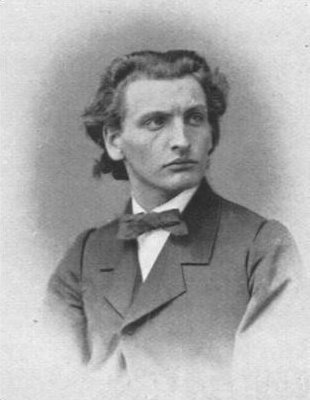

Friedrich Hegar (11 October 1841 – 2 June 1927) was a Swiss composer, conductor, teacher, and founding conductor of Tonhalle-Orchester Zürich. His students included Lily Reiff.

== Bibliography ==
- Hindley, Geoffrey (1982). "Music in the Modern World: Music in Switzerland". The Larousse Encyclopedia of Music (2nd ed.). New York City: Excalibur. ISBN 0-89673-101-4.
