= St. Willibrord's Church, Utrecht =

Roman Catholic church

St Willibrord's Church
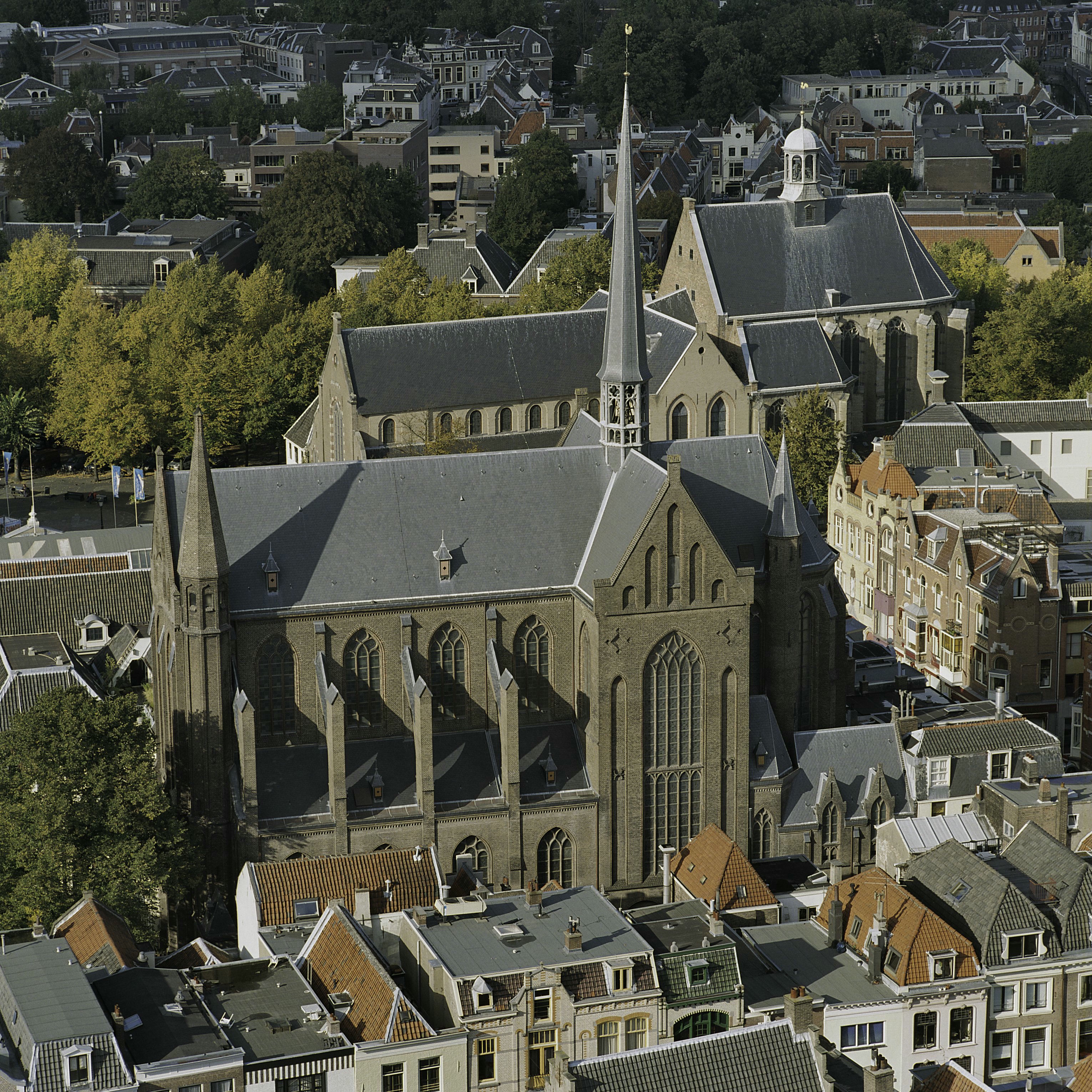

Religion
- Affiliation: Society of Saint Pius X
- Rite: Latin Rite
- Ecclesiastical or organisational status: Mission church
- Leadership: Saint Willibrordus Stichting

Location
- Location: Utrecht, Netherlands
- Interactive map of St Willibrord's Church
- Coordinates: 52°05′32″N 5°07′17″E

Architecture
- Style: Gothic Revival
- Completed: 1877
- Capacity: 350

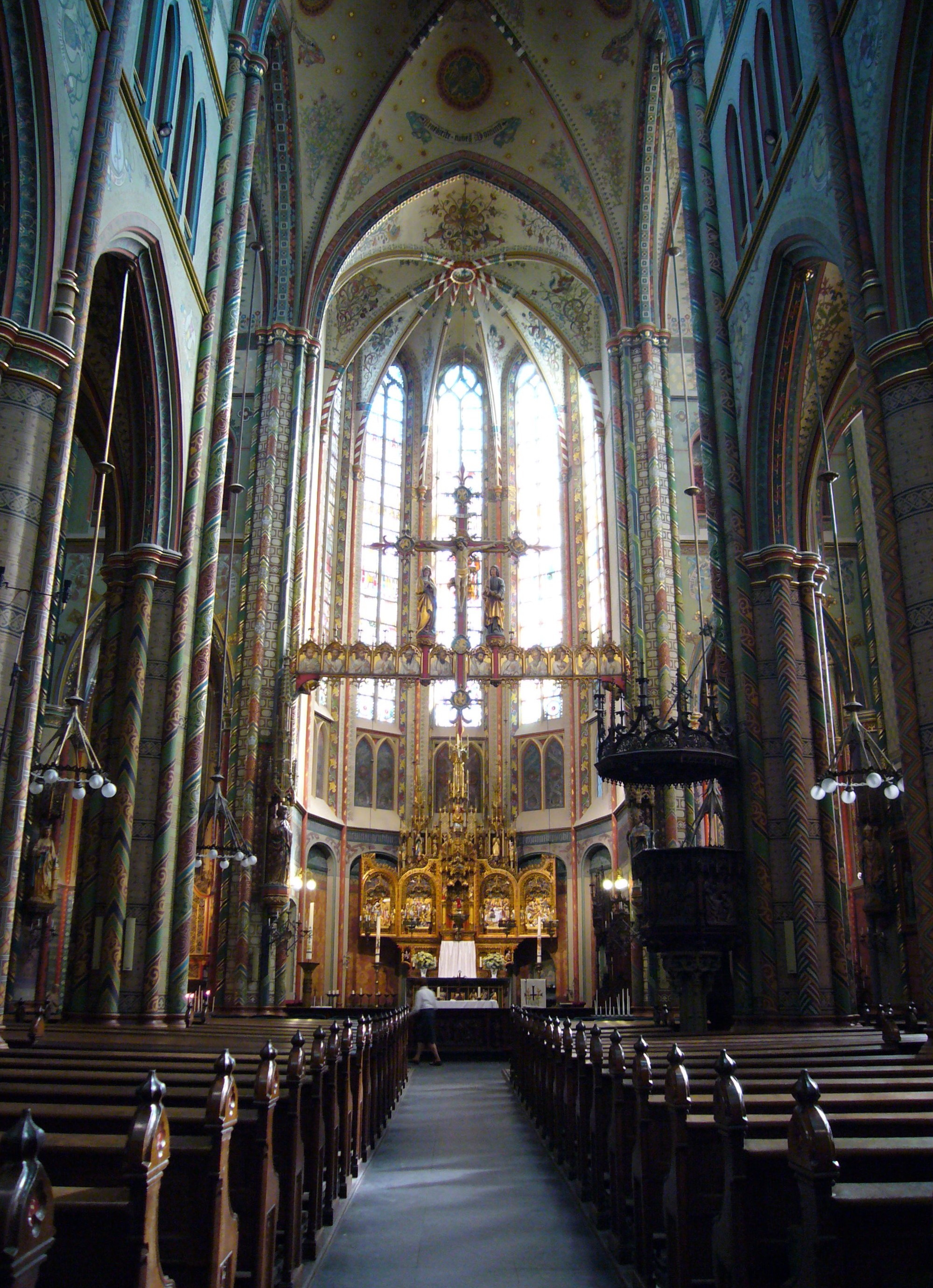

St Willibrord's Church, Utrecht, is a Roman Catholic church operated by the traditionalist Society of Saint Pius X (SSPX) and dedicated to Saint Willibrord. It is at Minrebroederstraat 21, Utrecht, in the Netherlands and has been designated a rijksmonument since 1976. It is currently owned by the Sint Willibrordus Stichting, which was founded by father Winand Kotte A.A. The church is near the Dom Church in the historical centre of Utrecht. It is considered a hidden treasure in the city. It is a fine example of Dutch gothic revival. Built in the nineteenth century, the interior was finished towards the end of that century. The church has a well known organ built by Maarschalkerweerd.

== History ==
The Willibrord's Church is constructed between 1875 and 1877 after the design of architect Alfred Tepe in gothic revival style. It is one of the most well kept remaining examples of the Utrecht Styl of the gothic revival. The sober exterior of the church is a great contrast with the elaborate and colourful interior. Many artists from the St. Bernulphus Guild worked together to decorate the church. Almost every wall of the church is painted. These colourful paintings are part of the various other elements of the church, including the wood carvings and stained glass windows depicting the life of St. Willibrord. The tabernacle doors are painted by Jacob Ydema (1939). In 2005 a large-scale restoration was completed, helping to maintain the unique and wonderfully colourful interior. The most important part of the church, the choir, is the most extensively decorated part of the church. Central to this is the symbolism of the Holy Sacrament. Because the church is surrounded by houses, the architect chose to build an extra high, yet short building with high windows. The church was dedicated in 1877 by monsignor Schaepman, but the interior wasn't completed until 1891.

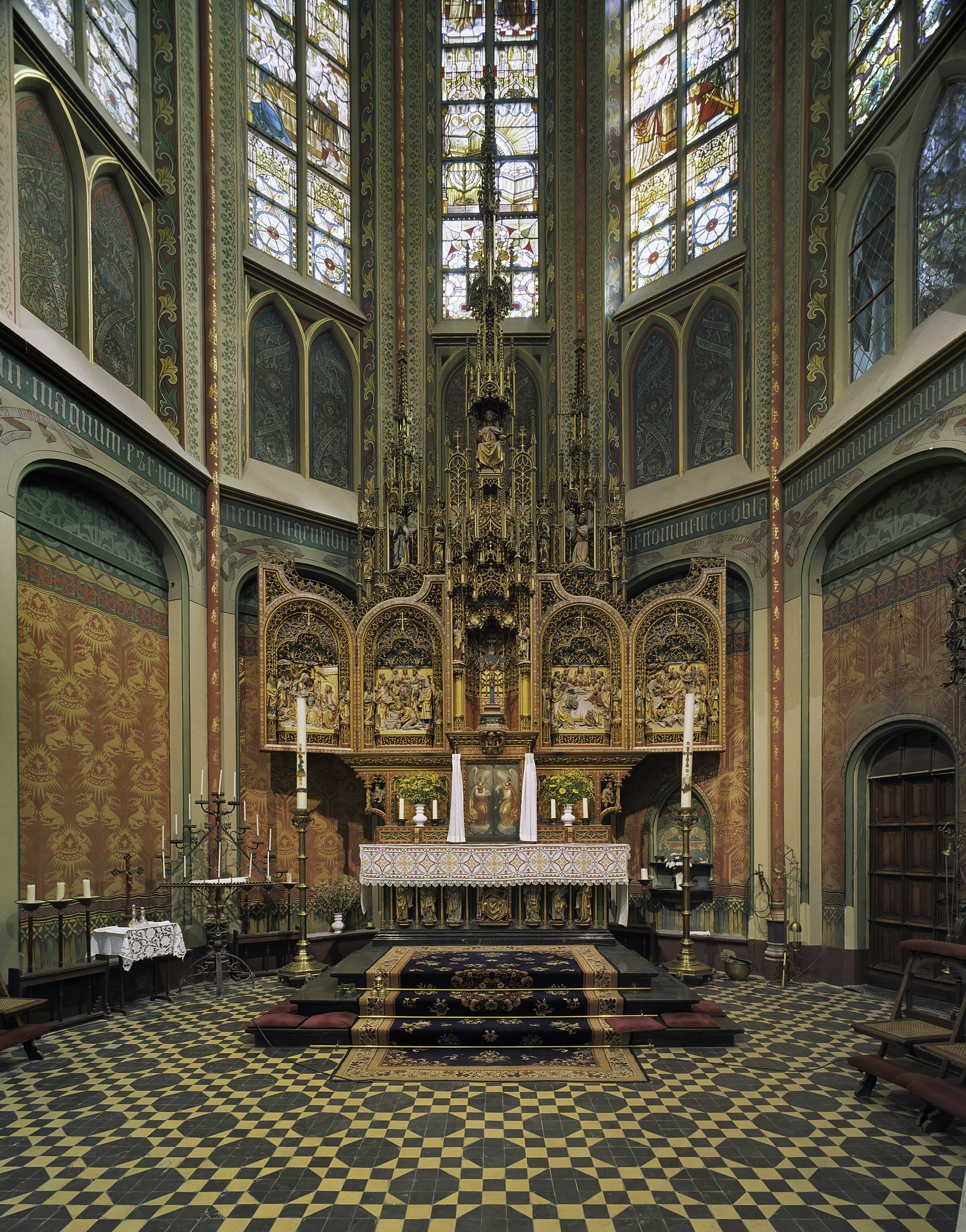

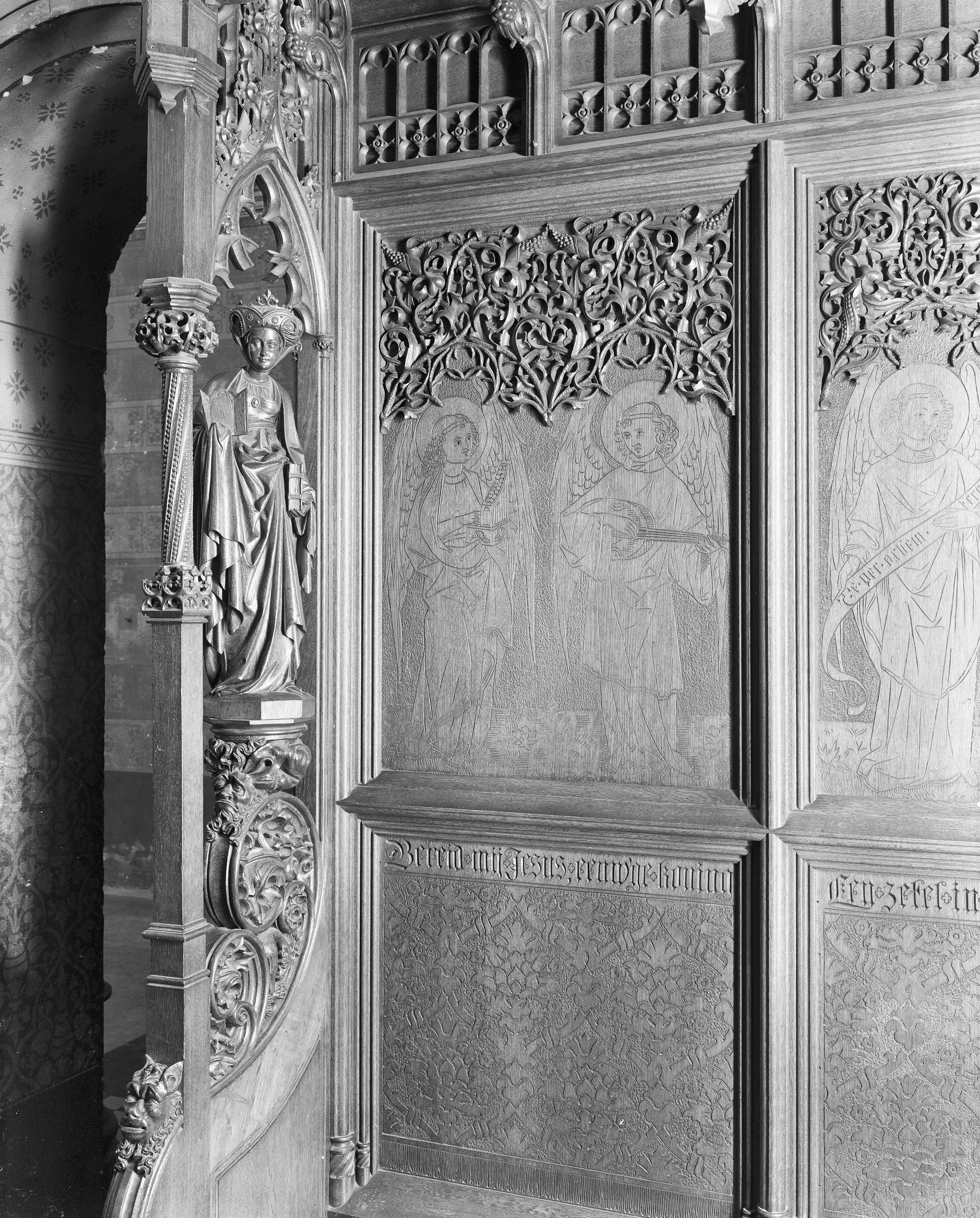
An ornately carved panel on sedilia at St. Willibrord's Church, Utrecht

== Relations with the Diocese ==
After the Second Vatican Council, the diocese of Utrecht wanted to sell and demolish the church. Lay people and father Winand Kotte A.A., bought the building and kept the interior with its many decorations intact. They celebrated the Mass in Latin, first the 1962 missal, and later 1969, until the death of their founder and shepherd.

== Current use ==
To keep the building maintained, the building is rented out for classical concerts during the week. Since December 2015 the Society of Saint Pius X has been operating the parish, with the sung Tridentine Masses taking place every Sunday at 10:30 am and masses on Friday at 7:00 pm and masses on Saturday at 11 am.

== See also ==
- Saint-Nicolas-du-Chardonnet (Another Church of the Priestly Society of Saint Pius X)
