= Oliver Widmer =

Swiss operatic bass-baritone (born 1965)

Oliver Widmer (born 24 March 1965) is a Swiss operatic bass-baritone whose international career has encompassed lieder, opera, and oratorio. In 1998 he created the role of Jäger in Heinz Holliger's opera Schneewittchen.

Widmer was born in Zürich and studied first under his father, the baritone Kurt Widmer, at the City of Basel Music Academy. He made his debut as a recitalist in 1985 followed by further study under Dietrich Fischer-Dieskau at the Hochschule für Musik Berlin from 1986 to 1989. He has been a member of the Zurich Opera from the early 1990s.

Widmer has been married to the mezzo-soprano Cecilia Bartoli since 2011.

== Recordings ==
Widmer's recordings on CD and DVD include:

- Bach: St Matthew Passion (bass soloist, "Gebt mir") – Concentus Musicus Wien, Vienna Boys' Choir, Arnold Schoenberg Choir; Nikolaus Harnoncourt (conductor). CD Teldec 2564 64347-2
- Donizetti: Don Pasquale (as Dottor Malatesta) – Orchestra and Chorus of the Zürich Opera House; Nello Santi (conductor). DVD Decca 000944109
- Haydn: Schöpfungsmesse (bass soloist) – English Baroque Soloists, Monteverdi Choir; John Eliot Gardiner (conductor). CD Philips 470297
- Mozart: Così fan tutte (as Don Alfonso) – Orchestra and Chorus of the Zürich Opera House; Franz Welser-Möst (conductor). DVD Arthaus Musik 101495
- Purcell: King Arthur (multiple roles) – Vienna Concentus Musicus, Vienna State Opera Chorus; Nikolaus Harnoncourt (conductor). Recorded live at the Salzburg Festival. DVD Euroarts 2054508
- Schumann: Genoveva (as Siegfried) – Chamber Orchestra of Europe; Nikolaus Harnoncourt (conductor). CD Teldec 013144
