= Ilona Durigo =

Hungarian classical contralto

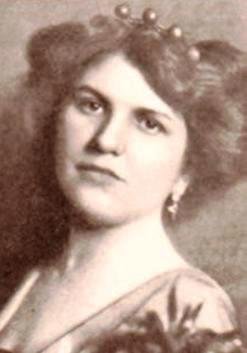
- Ilona Durigo c. 1900
- Born: 13 May 1881; Budapest, Hungary
- Died: 25 December 1943 (aged 62); Budapest, Hungary
- Occupations: Classical contralto; Academic voice teacher
- Organizations: Zürcher Konservatorium; Budapest Conservatory

Ilona Durigo (13 May 1881 – 25 December 1943) was a Hungarian classical contralto and an academic voice teacher. She appeared internationally, mostly in concert, singing Lieder and oratorios. She is known for singing Lieder that Othmar Schoeck composed for her, and is regarded as one of the leading concert contraltos of her era.

== Life ==
Born in Budapest on 13 May 1881, Durigo was a pupil of Bianca Malezcky and Julius Stockhausen. She studied from 1902 at the Vienna Conservatory with Philipp Forstén, then took further studies with Etelka Gerster and Eduard Bellwidt in Berlin.

Each year from 1930 to 1939 she performed the alto part in Bach's St Matthew Passion with the Concertgebouw Orchestra, conducted by Willem Mengelberg. This included the first recording of the work in 1939, alongside Karl Erb as the Evangelist and Willem Ravelli as the vox Christi. She performed as a soloist in more than 40 concerts with the choir Der Gemischte Chor Zürich between 1911 and 1943. Singing also in musical centres of Austria, Germany, Belgium and Italy, she is regarded as one of the leading concert contraltos of the period.

In 1912, Durigo first performed with Othmar Schoeck, and in 1913 she entered his social circle and they became friends. Durigo fell in love with Schoeck, but her feelings were not returned, and in any event she was by then married to the Hungarian pianist Osman Kasics. Her relationship with Schoeck was at times turbulent, but Durigo soon became the best-known interpreter of his work, and in later life he stated that she was the finest singer of his songs he had found.

Her many collaborations with Schoeck included his settings of poems by Hesse. The reviewer of her recital in Bern on 23 March 1915, with Schoeck as the pianist, in the Berner Tagblatt praised her differentiated expression of emotions and the accord with the pianist:

Frau Durigo sang diese und alle anderen Lieder (mit der Zugabe waren es 19) ... mit tiefster Empfindung. Ihr eigenes Erleben dieser Lieder äusserte sich nicht allein in den musikalischen Vortragsdifferenzierungen (so wunderzart, poesieverklärte Töne, wie die ihres Kopfregisters, hörte man vorher von keiner Sängerin), sondern auch im zu- und abnehmenden Glanz ihrer Augen, dieses wahren Seelenspiegels. Und dass ihre Interpretation durchwegs das vom Komponisten Empfundene zutreffend erfasste, bewies die vollkommene Harmonie ihres herrlichen Gesanges mit Schoecks eigenartig schönem Klavierspiel.
Frau Durigo sang these and all other songs (with those added there were nineteen) ... with the deepest sensitivity. Her own experience of the songs shone through, not only in the musical differences of enunciation (such wonderfully fine, such poetry-transfigured tones of the head−voice were never heard before from any singer), but also in the sparkle of her eyes, the true mirror of the soul, as it came and went. And the perfect harmony between her splendid singing and the exceptionally beautiful piano playing of Schoeck showed that her interpretation throughout captured the intentions of the composer.

Durigo was a voice teacher at the Zürich Conservatory from 1921 to 1937, where one of her students was Maria Stader. She was a friend of Hermann Hesse, the composer and conductor Fritz Brun, and the violinist Alphonse Brun.

Durigo returned to Budapest in 1937 and taught at the Liszt Conservatory. She died on 25 December 1943.
