= Tonhalle-Orchester Zürich =

Swiss orchestra

Coordinates: 47.366025°N 8.537650°E

- Orchestra
- Official logo
- Founded: 1868; 158 years ago
- Location: Zurich, Switzerland
- Concert hall: Tonhalle
- Principal conductor: Paavo Järvi
- Website: Official website

The Tonhalle-Orchester Zürich is a Swiss symphony orchestra based in Zurich. Its principal residence is the Tonhalle concert hall.

== Early history prior to the orchestra ==
Precursor music ensembles in Zurich have included the music societies Zum Chorherresaal (around 1600), Ab dem Musiksaal beim Kornhaus (1613), and Zum Fraumünster (1679). In 1812, these ensembles consolidated into a single organization with the name Allgemeine Musik-Gesellschaft (AMG), which included the formation of an orchestra who performed on an annual, seasonal and non-permanent basis. In the early history of the AMG orchestra, its first principal conductors were Casimir von Blumenthal (1821–1846) and Franz Abt (1846–1852). The impetus for the establishment of a permanent orchestra in Zurich came in 1861, with the Schweizerische Musikfest (Swiss Music Festival) scheduled in Zurich that year. Citizens in Zurich wished the musicians to remain after the festival, but the AMG did not have the financial resources to establish a permanent resident orchestra. Subsequently, a group of Zurich citizens founded the Orchesterverein in 1865 as the city's first permanent orchestra. The founding of the Tonhalle-Orchester Zurich followed several years later, in 1868. Both ensembles continue to perform in Zurich today.

== Orchestra history ==
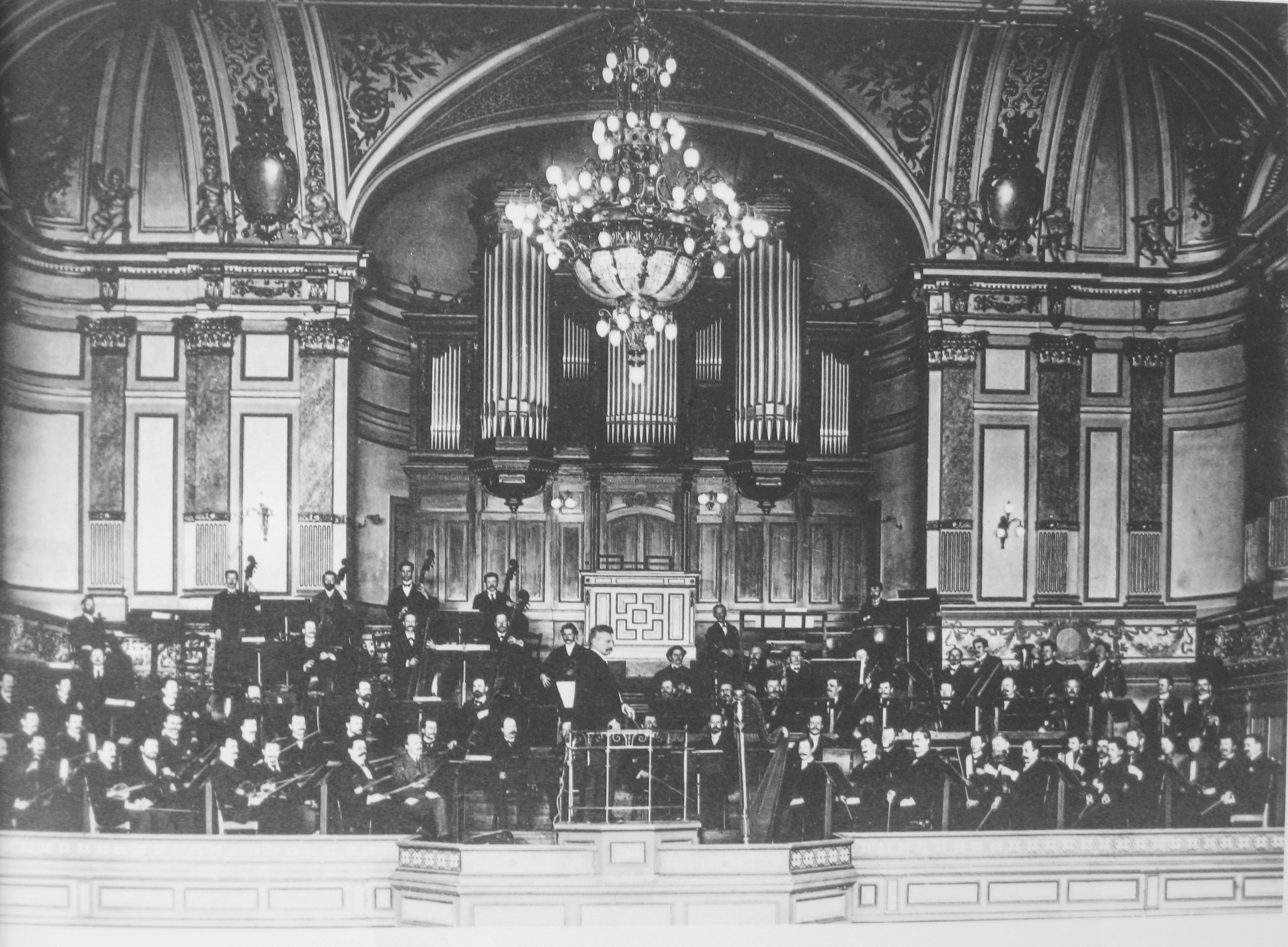
The Tonhalle-Orchester with conductor Friedrich Hegar, ca. 1900

The first principal conductor of the Tonhalle-Orchester was Friedrich Hegar, who served from its founding in 1868 through 1906. His successor, Volkmar Andreae, served an even longer tenure as chief conductor, from 1906 to 1949, the longest in the orchestra's history, directing around 1,300 concerts with the orchestra. Andreae's tenure featured the first family concerts by the orchestra, beginning in 1928. In 1947, the city of Zurich formalised performances of concerts for young people by the orchestra, as part of the agreements for city funding and subsidy of the orchestra. More recently, during the chief conductorship of David Zinman, the orchestra established its "tonhalleLATE" series of late-evening concerts that combine shorter-length symphonic concerts with socializing afterwards to electronic music.

In the interregnum between the chief conductorships of Hiroshi Wakasugi and David Zinman, Claus Peter Flor served as principal guest conductor from 1991 to 1995. Zinman became chief conductor in 1995, and remained in the post until July 2014, the orchestra's longest serving chief conductor since Andreae. The orchestra made its debut at The Proms in September 2003 with Zinman, and his final concert as chief conductor was a July 2014 Proms appearance. During his tenure, Zinman introduced elements of historically informed performance into the orchestra's playing style and greatly expanded their recording presence.

In October 2012, the orchestra named Lionel Bringuier as its next chief conductor, as of the 2014–2015 season, with an initial contract of four years. Concurrent with the advent of Bringuier as chief conductor in the 2014–2015 season, Esa-Pekka Salonen served in the newly created post of Creative Chair of the orchestra. Bringuier concluded his tenure at the end of the 2017–2018 season.

In May 2017, the orchestra announced the appointment of Paavo Järvi as its next chief conductor, effective with the 2019–2020 season, with an initial contract of five years. Järvi had first guest-conducted the Tonhalle Orchestra in 2009, and returned in December 2016. In December 2022, the orchestra announced an extension of Järvi's contract as its chief conductor through the 2028–2029 season. The current Intendantin (executive and artistic director) of the orchestra is Ilona Schmiel, currently contracted to the orchestra through the 2028–2029 season.

=== Recordings ===
The orchestra and Andreae made a small number of recordings in the late 1920s, of music of Vivaldi and Wolfgang Amadeus Mozart. In 1947, Franz Lehár recorded a number of 78-rpm discs of his music with the orchestra for Decca Records. The discs were issued in the U.S. by London Records, initially in the 78-rpm format and then on LPs. Some of the recordings are now available through Naxos Records on CD. The orchestra's recording profile has expanded most prominently during the tenure of Zinman, with many recordings for such labels as Arte Nova and RCA. In particular, his recordings for Arte Nova of the complete Beethoven symphonies achieved notable renown, as one of the earliest recorded cycles to use the new Jonathan Del Mar edition of the symphonies, with observation of Beethoven's metronome markings.

== Chief conductors ==
- Friedrich Hegar (1868–1906)
- Volkmar Andreae (1906–1949)
- Erich Schmid (1949–1957)
- Hans Rosbaud (1957–1962)
- Rudolf Kempe (1965–1972)
- Charles Dutoit (1967–1971)
- Gerd Albrecht (1975–1980)
- Christoph Eschenbach (1982–1986)
- Hiroshi Wakasugi (1987–1991)
- David Zinman (1995–2014)
- Lionel Bringuier (2014–2018)
- Paavo Järvi (2019–present)

== Creative chairs ==
- Esa-Pekka Salonen (2014–2015)
- Jörg Widmann (2015–2016)
- Péter Eötvös (2016–2017)
- Brett Dean (2017–2018)
- Matthias Pintscher (2018–2019)
- Erkki-Sven Tüür (2019–2020)
- Arvo Pärt (2020–2021)
- John Adams (2021–2022)
- Toshio Hosokawa (2022–2023)
- Bryce Dessner (2023–2024)
- Anna Thorvaldsdottir (2024–2025)
- Thomas Adès (2025–2026)
- Dieter Ammann (2026–2027)
