= Maria Stader =

Hungarian-born Swiss opera soprano (1911–1999)

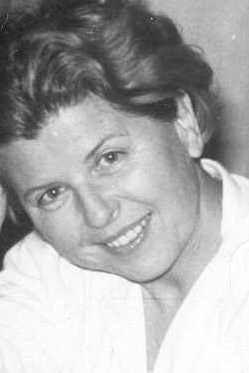
Maria Stader on Rigi-Kaltbad, New Year 1965

Maria Stader (November 5, 1911 – April 27, 1999) was a Hungarian-born Swiss lyric soprano, known particularly for her Mozart interpretations.

== Biography ==
Stader was born in Budapest, Austria-Hungary, on November 5, 1911, as Maria Molnár. During and after World War I, the price of food in Budapest was so high that it was difficult for her parents to support their five children. Maria and her younger sister, Elisabeth, were taken to Switzerland by The Salvation Army to recuperate for three months after being diagnosed with malnutrition. There, Maria's foster parents requested she stay for a full nine months. However, once in Budapest again, Maria fell seriously ill and it was also determined she would need her tonsils operated on. Her foster parents arranged for her to return to Switzerland. Because of difficulties with the immigration office, Maria could not remain in the canton of Zürich, so her foster father found her a place with the Stader family in Romanshorn, where there is also the commemorative Maria-Stader path. They later adopted her.

In 1939, Stader married Hans Erismann, the music director of Weinfelden and later the choir director of the Zürich Opera House. Through the husband of her vocal teacher, Mathilde Bärlocher, she met Stefi Geyer and her husband. Geyer herself was born in Budapest and had moved to Zürich in 1920; she then became an ongoing supporter of Stader's career. Another native of Budapest, Ilona Durigo, became her vocal teacher in 1935 in Zürich and introduced her to Hermann and Lily Reiff (a student of Franz Liszt). The Reiffs' home was the frequent meeting place of Adolf Busch and his brother Hermann Busch, Thomas Mann and the entire ensemble of the Zürich Opera and Zürich Theater. Fritz Busch arranged for Stader to go to the Schnabel School in Tremezzo, run by the wife of Artur Schnabel, a few years later. From 1938 on, Stader received training from Giannina Arangi-Lombardi in Milan.

Stader was a close friend of the Swiss politician Walther Bringolf, as well as of numerous musicians – especially pianist Clara Haskil and the Hungarian conductor Ferenc Fricsay (with whom she became acquainted through Rolf Liebermann). She was also a friend of the French film director, Emil-Edwin Reinert and she corresponded with Albert Schweitzer.

== Career ==
Stader first achieved fame for her interpretations of Mozart and her collaborations with conductor Ferenc Fricsay on works such as Don Giovanni, Le nozze di Figaro, Die Entführung aus dem Serail, two versions (1954 and 1960) of Exsultate, jubilate and the Great Mass, as well as Verdi's Messa da Requiem. She won, the Geneva International Music Competition in 1939, but although she "seemed poised for major stardom... her career was delayed by the outbreak of World War II", according to Opera News. Later in her career, Stader acquired a reputation as an outstanding Bach interpreter, especially with Karl Richter and Ferenc Fricsay. She recorded the Requiem by Antonín Dvořák with Karel Ančerl, and Beethoven's opera Fidelio (as Marzelline) with Hans Knappertsbusch.

Stader was highly praised for her fine, if not very powerful, voice. She nearly always performed operatic roles in the recording studio and seldom, if ever, on stage because of her small stature – she was about 1.44 metres (4 ft 9 in) tall. She preferred the concert repertory, but, "even in concert, she frequently had to stand on a platform or box in order to be seen properly by the audience", according to Opera News. This also enabled Stader to avoid the strain experienced by many operatic singers, and preserve her fresh and delicate-sounding voice until well into the 1960s. She stood on the concert podium for the last time in Philharmonic Hall in New York in Mozart's Requiem on December 7, 1969, "still in solid vocal condition".

Stader with accompanist husband Hans Erismann 1963 on a tour of South Africa

External audio
- Maria Stader singing in W. A. Mozart's Mass in C major (Coronation) K. 317, with the Berlin Philharmonic conducted by Igor Markevitch in 1955; via Internet Archive

Her concert tours had taken her around the world. Besides Europe and America, she sang in Japan, South Africa, and South America. Stader sang in various festivals, including the Salzburg Festival, the Lucerne Festival, at the Prades Festival and at the Aspen Music Festival. She sang under the leadership of many well-known conductors including Eugen Jochum, Josef Krips, Eugene Ormandy, George Szell, Carl Schuricht, Rafael Kubelík, Bruno Walter, Hermann Scherchen, Otto Klemperer, Ernest Ansermet and Dean Dixon. Until 1951, she taught at the Zürich Conservatory (merged in 1999 into the School of Music, Drama, and Dance (HMT), itself merged in 2007 into the Zurich University of the Arts (ZHdK)) and later held master classes there.

The title of her autobiography, Nehmt meinen Dank, is taken from Mozart's aria for soprano and orchestra, "Nehmt meinen Dank, ihr holden Gönner!", K. 383.

She died in Zürich on April 27, 1999.

== Awards ==
- 1939 – First place, Geneva International Music Competition
- 1950 – Lilli Lehmann Medal, International Mozarteum Foundation
- 1956 – Silver Mozart Medal of the International Mozarteum Foundation
- 1964 – Hans Georg Nägeli Medal by the Zürich City Council

== Articles by Stader ==
- "Ferenc Fricsay", in: Diener der Musik. Unvergessene Solisten und Dirigenten unserer Zeit im Spiegel der Freunde. Published by Martin Müller and Wolfgang Mertz. Tübingen, Rainer Wunderlich, 1965.
- "Zusammenarbeit mit Fricsay", in Friedrich Herzfeld (ed.): Ferenc Fricsay. Ein Gedenkbuch. Berlin, Rembrand, 1964.
- Über Wilhelm Furtwängler, in Furtwängler Recalled. Zürich, Atlantis, 1965.
