= Willem Ravelli =

Dutch classical bass-baritone (1892–1980)

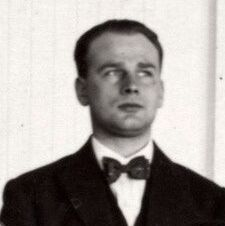
- Willem Ravelli in 1922
- Born: Willem Albert Felix Ravelli; 31 May 1892; The Hague, Netherlands
- Died: 21 September 1980 (aged 88); Laren, North Holland
- Occupations: Classical bass-baritone; Academic voice teacher
- Organizations: Rotterdam Conservatory; De Nederlandse Opera

Willem Ravelli (31 May 1892 – 21 September 1980) was a Dutch classical bass-baritone and an academic voice teacher. After a short operatic career with De Nederlandse Opera, he worked mostly in concert, singing Lieder and oratorios. He is known for as the voice of Christ in Bach's St Matthew Passion, which he performed more than 400 times, including the first recording of the work.

== Career ==
Born Willem Albert Felix Ravelli in The Hague, Ravelli studied voice with Frans Andreolie and Cornélie van Zanten, then at the conservatory in his home town in the opera class of Anton Sistermans.

Ravelli was a member of the De Nederlandse Opera in Amsterdam from the 1922/23 season. He appeared in many supporting roles, such as Morales in Bizet's Carmen and Alcindor in Puccini's La bohème, and in 1927 as Wolfram in Wagner's Tannhäuser.

He focused on concert singing, succeeding Thomas Denijs as the vox Christi in the regular performances of Bach's St Matthew Passion conducted by Willem Mengelberg. He sang the role in the first recording of the work in 1939, with the Toonkunstkoor Amsterdam and the Concertgebouw Orchestra, alongside Karl Erb as the Evangelist. A reviewer of a reissue of the performance which was shortened as customary at the time of the recording, notes in 2004: "As Jesus the Dutch bass Willem Ravelli can be a mite gruff but he's also a spiritually intense presence and right inside the role, one incidentally he performed over four hundred times."

Ravelli also appeared in Belgium, England and Germany, presenting a broad repertory including the bass part in Beethoven's Ninth Symphony. He recorded the symphony in 1940, again with Mengelberg, the Toonkunstkoor and the Concertgebouw Orchestra, and the Royal Oratorio Society.

Ravelli was a voice teacher at the Rotterdam Conservatory from 1937, and at the conservatory in The Hague from 1945. He died in Laren, North Holland.
