= Golgotha (oratorio) =

Oratorio by Frank Martin

Golgotha is an oratorio for five soloists, orchestra, organ, piano and mixed choir composed by Frank Martin from 1945 to 1948, premiered in Geneva on 29 April 1949 under the direction of Samuel Baud-Bovy.

== Movements ==
First part

1. Introduction choir: Père! Père! Père! Jusqu'à quel point nous as-Tu donc aimés!.
2. Les Rameaux.
3. Le Discours du Temple.
4. La Sainte Cène.
5. Gethsémané.

Second part

1. Introduction dialogue: Que dirais-je, Que ferais-je?.
2. Jésus devant le Sanhédrin.
3. Jésus devant Pilate.
4. Le Calvaire.
5. Dialogue of conclusion: O Mort! Où est ton aiguillon?.

(texts from the four Gospels and Confessions of Augustine).

== Bibliography ==
- Frank Martin, Lettres à Victor Desarzens (introduction, notes et index by Peter Sulzer); L'Âge d'Homme, Lausanne, 1988.
- Maria Boeke Martin, Souvenirs de ma vie avec Frank Martin; L'Âge d'Homme, Lausanne, 1990.
- Harry Halbreich, Frank Martin: esquisse biographique et personnelle - Genèse et naissance de Golgotha, considérations générales - Frank Martin comments "Golgotha" - Brief analytical overview of the score; Erato Records STU 70497-Club Gutenberg, January 1975 (recording "canned" on 1, 2 and 3 November 1968, expression in quotation marks from the composer to conductor Victor Desarzens of 25 September 1968).
- Frank Martin and Jean-Claude Piguet, Entretiens sur la musique; La Baconnière, Neuchâtel, 1967 (a text based on interviews broadcast on Radio Suisse Romande during the 1966-1967 season).
- Roger Boss, Frank Martin, Introduction to the concert of 18 February 1962; Concert program for the 40th anniversary of the Société chorale de La Chaux-de-Fonds (1922-1962)
- Cover of ERATO's compact disc with the lyrics of Harry Halbreich (citing Frank Martin through the Entretiens sur la musique) and Frank Martin himself about his "Messe pour double chœur a capella" attached to the Golgotha.
