= Werner M. Moser =

Swiss architect (1896–1970)

Werner Max Moser
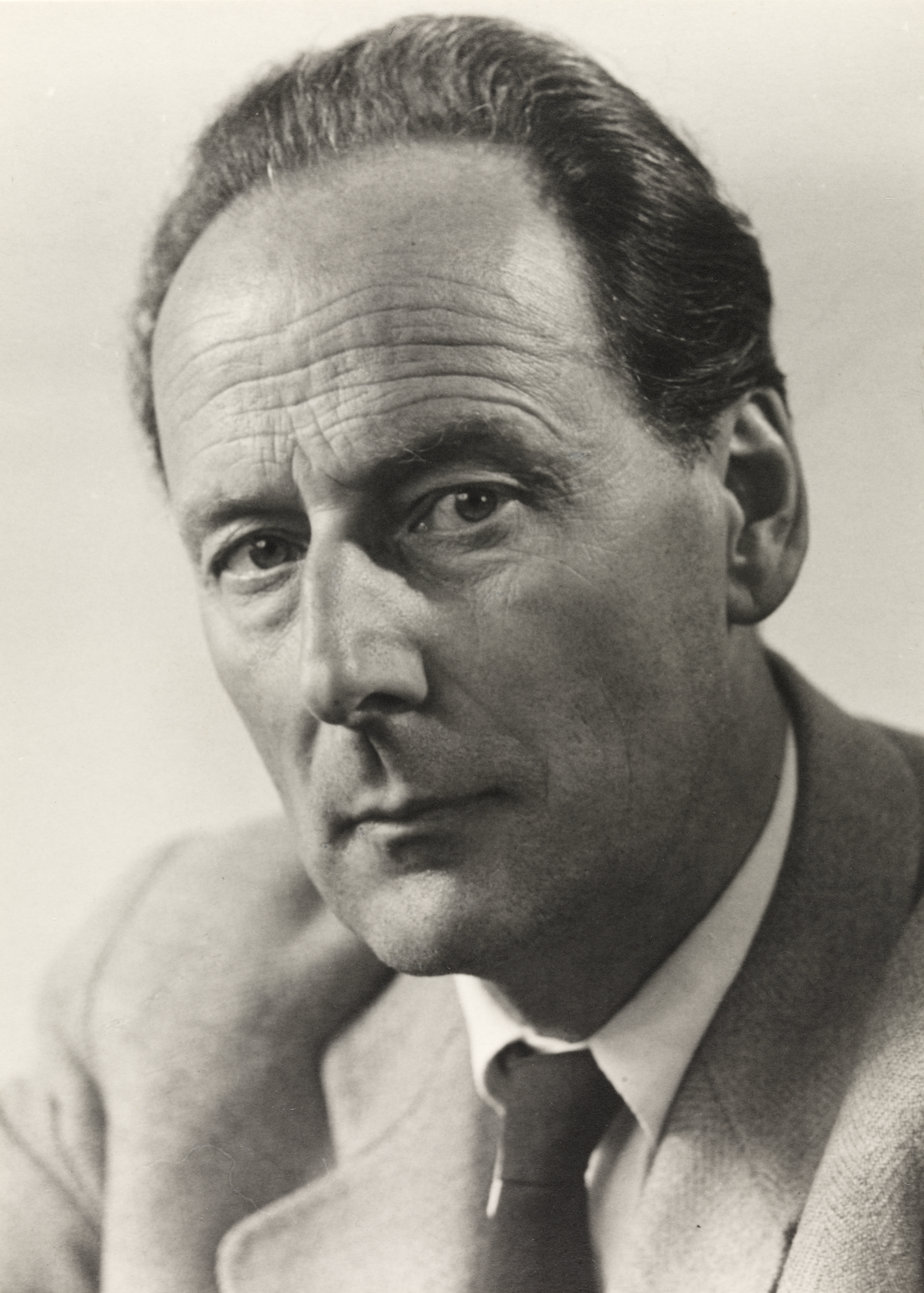
- Werner Moser at ETH Zurich (1949)
- Born: 16 July 1896; Karlsruhe, Germany
- Died: 19 August 1970 (aged 74); Zurich, Switzerland
- Occupation: Architect
- Parent: Karl Moser (Father)

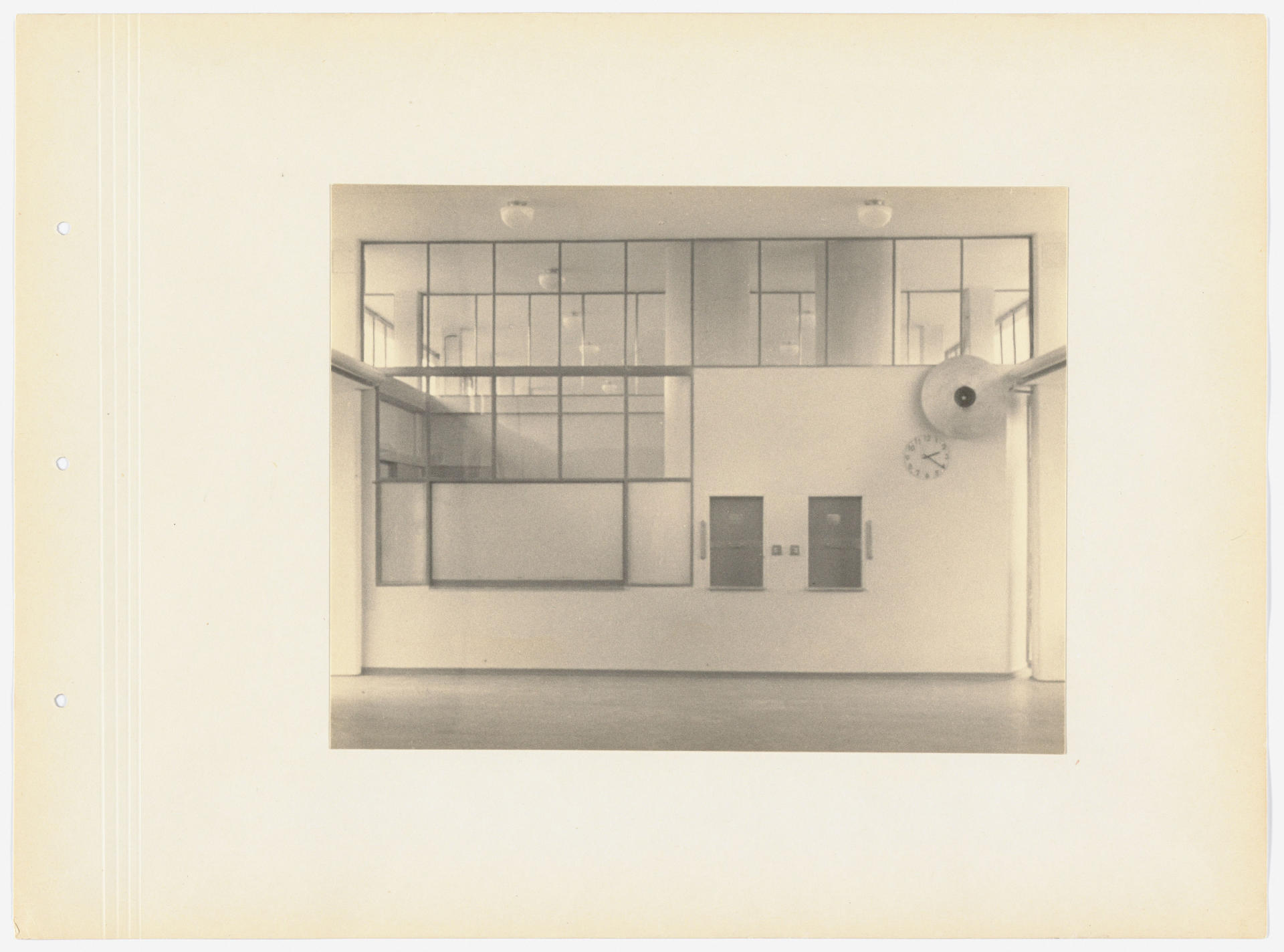
House of the Henry and Emma Budge Foundation in Frankfurt am Main

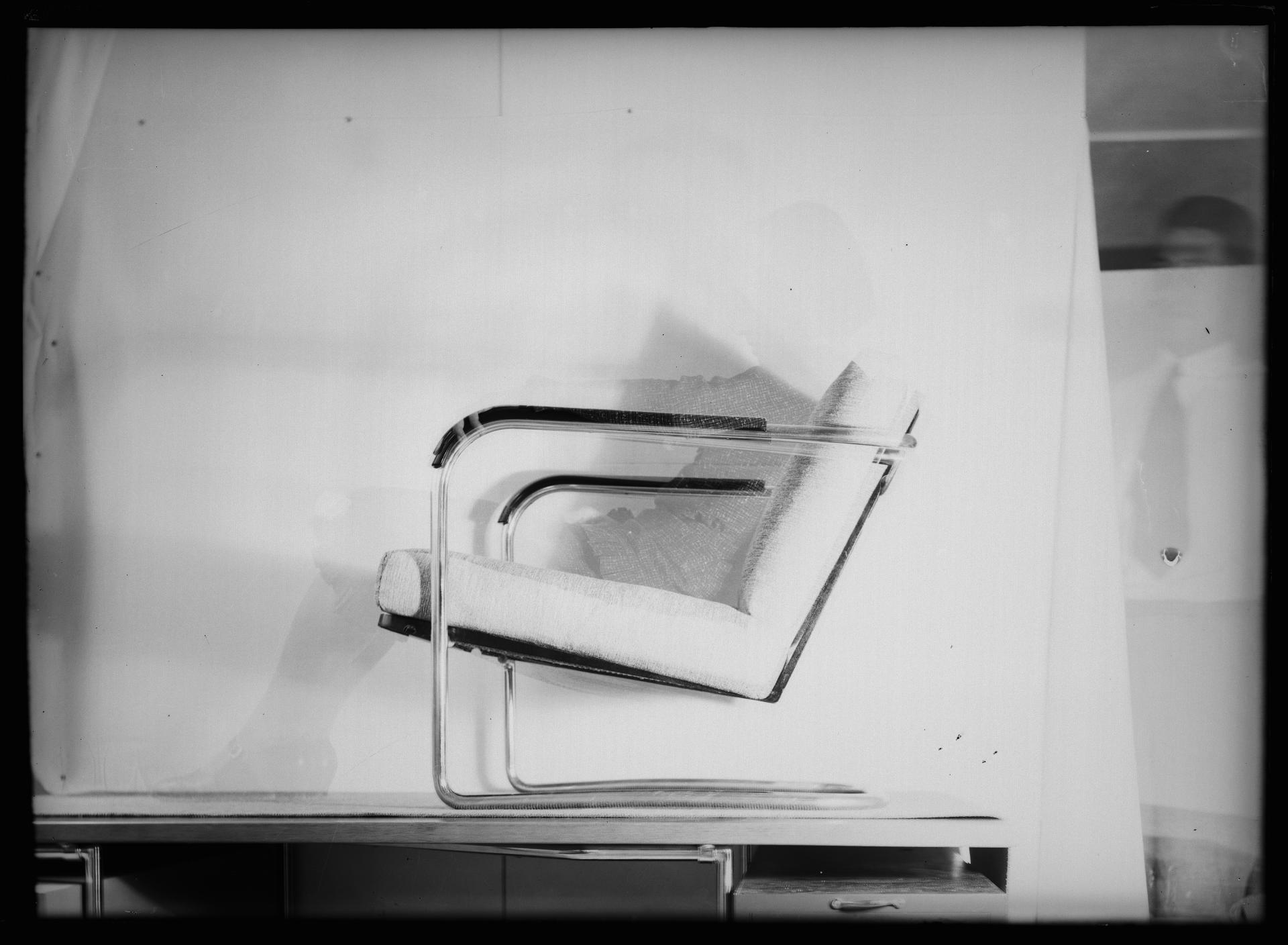
Moser armchair designed in 1930, production: Embru

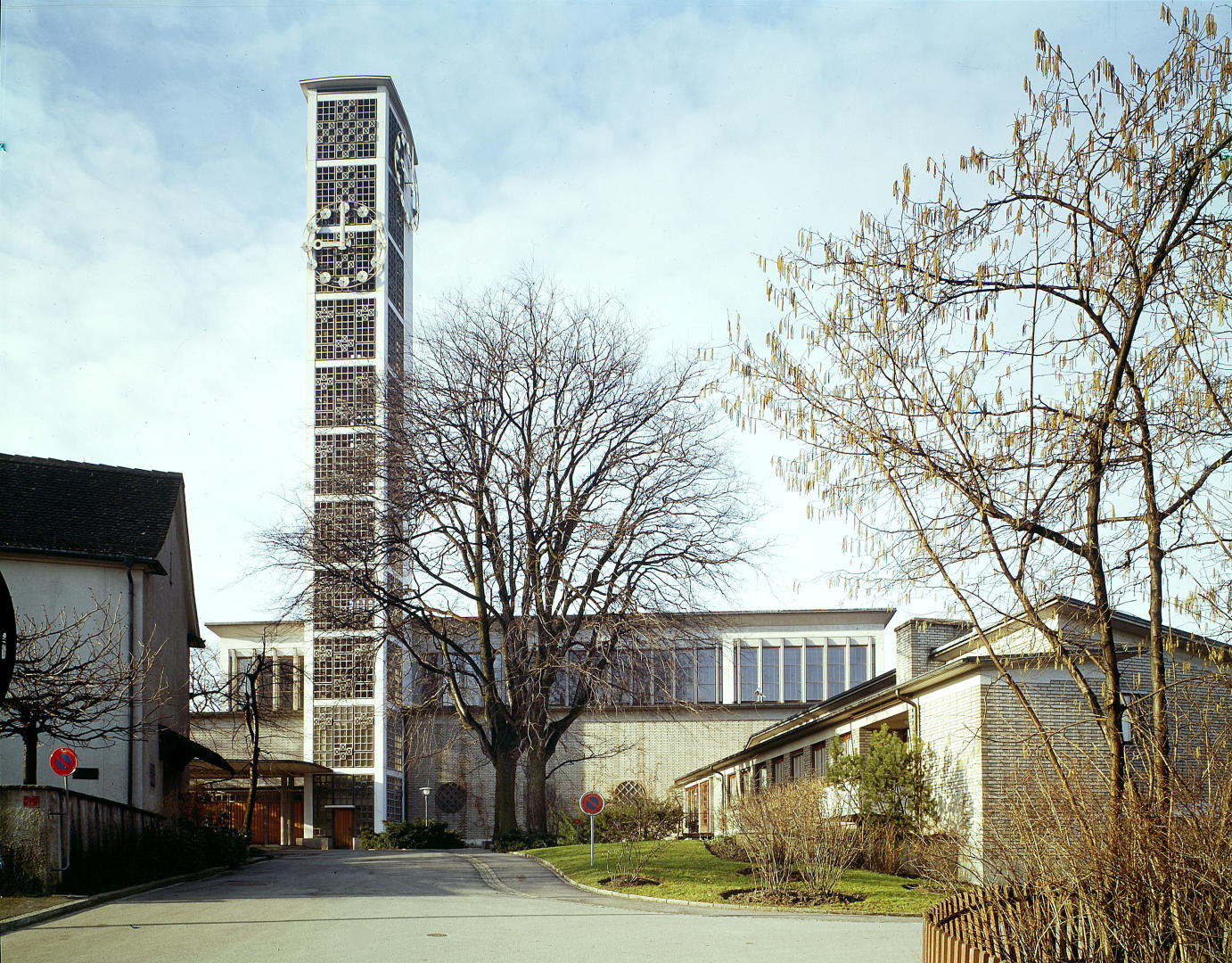
Protestant Reformed Church Centre in Zurich-Altstetten

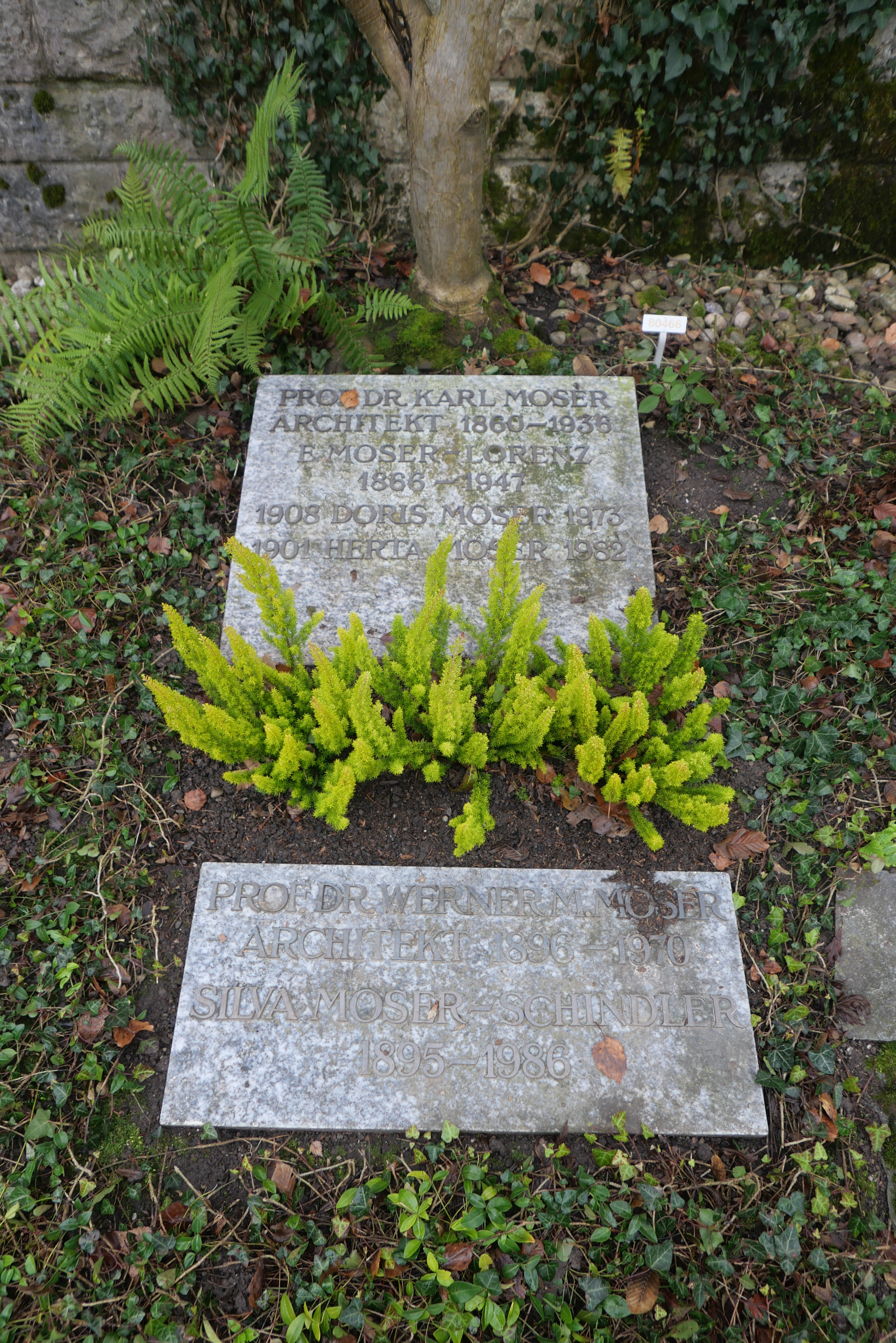
The Moser family grave in Zurich

Werner Max Moser (16 July 1896 – 19 August 1970) was a Swiss architect and a proponent of modernist architecture. His notable works include the Kongresshaus (Zurich), Cantonal Hospital (Zurich), and the campus of IIT Kharagpur (India). Moser founded the Haefeli Moser Steiger (HMS) office community for architectural design projects in Zurich and established the Wohnbedarf interior design studio.

== Education and early career ==
Born in Karlsruhe, Germany, Moser studied architecture at ETH Zurich from 1916 to 1921. While there, he undertook a semester at the Technical University of Stuttgart under Paul Bonatz, Adolf Abel, and Ernst Fiechter. He graduated under the supervision of his father, Karl Moser, and designed a market hall in Oerlikon for his graduation project.

Moser worked in Rotterdam for 2 years at the firm of Granpré Molière, Verhagen, and Kok. Between 1923 and 1926, he was employed in the United States at the offices of Frank Lloyd Wright (Spring Green and Los Angeles), Schmidt, Garden & Martin (Chicago), and Drake Brothers (Evanston).

Upon his return to Switzerland, Moser collaborated with other Swiss architects to design the model furnishings for Ludwig Mies van der Rohe's apartment building at the Werkbund exhibition in Stuttgart in 1927.

== Major Architectural Works in Germany and Switzerland ==
In 1928, Werner co-founded the Congrès Internationaux d'Architecture Moderne (CIAM) in La Sarraz, Switzerland, along with 28 prominent European architects, including Le Corbusier, Sigfried Giedion, Hendrik Berlage, and his father.

Moser was part of the architect group that planned the Werkbund Estate Neubühl in Wollishofen from 1928 until 1932. From 1928 until 1930, he collaborated with Mart Stam and Ferdinand Kramer to build the retirement house of the Henry and Emma Budge Foundation in Frankfurt am Main. During this time, he designed three privates house in Zurich in the New Modernist style (Villa Hagmann, House Moser/Guggenbühl, and Villa Fleiner).

In 1931, Moser – along with architects Sigfried Giedon and Rudolf Graber – founded the Wohnbedarf, a modern interior design showroom in Zurich to which he contributed numerous models. For the company's 80th anniversary, the Werner Max Moser Limited Edition range was launched at the Talstrasse store.

In the 1930s, Moser participated in urban planning studies with the Zurich CIAM group and in important exhibitions on modern school building (Das Kind und sein Schulhaus, 1933) and modern bathing culture (Das Bad von heute und gestern, 1934–1935) at the Museum of Design in Zurich.

In the same year, he successfully participated with Max Ernst Haefeli in the competition for the Allenmoos outdoor swimming pool in Zurich (built between 1938 and 1939). The first "Parkbad" in Switzerland, designed in collaboration with the garden architect Gustav Ammann, was the model for many later open-air pools in the country.

In 1936, Moser, along with fellow architects Haefeli and Rudolf Steiger, won the design contract for the Kongresshaus Zurich, which resulted in the founding of the Haefeli Moser Steiger (HMS) architectural firm. Built between 1938 and 1939 in connection with the Swiss National Exhibition in Zurich, the Kongresshaus is considered a key building of modern Swiss architecture.

Moser was also responsible for designing the Protestant-Reformed church centre in Altstetten (1937–1942) and the Cantonal Hospital (1938–1953, today University Hospital) in Zurich, the latter of which was partly built under wartime economic conditions. In 1950, Moser was awarded the design project for the campus of the Indian Institute of Technology Kharagpur in West Bengal, India (c. 1950).

== Death and Legacy ==
In later projects, Moser and HMS gravitated towards the construction of office spaces, an example of which is the 14-story high-rise Zur Palme, built in collaboration with architect André M. Studer (1959–1964).

In 1958, Moser was awarded an honorary doctorate by the Technical University of Stuttgart. He joined the Department of Architecture at ETH Zurich as a professor from 1958 until 1963.

Werner Moser died in Zurich on 19 August 1970 aged 74, and is buried in Fluntern Cemetery (Zurich) alongside his parents and his wife Silva Moser-Schindler (1895–1986).
