= Max Ernst Haefeli =

Swiss architect and furniture designer (1901–1976)

- Born: January 25, 1901; Zurich, Switzerland
- Died: June 17, 1976 (aged 75); Herrliberg, Switzerland
- Occupation: Architect

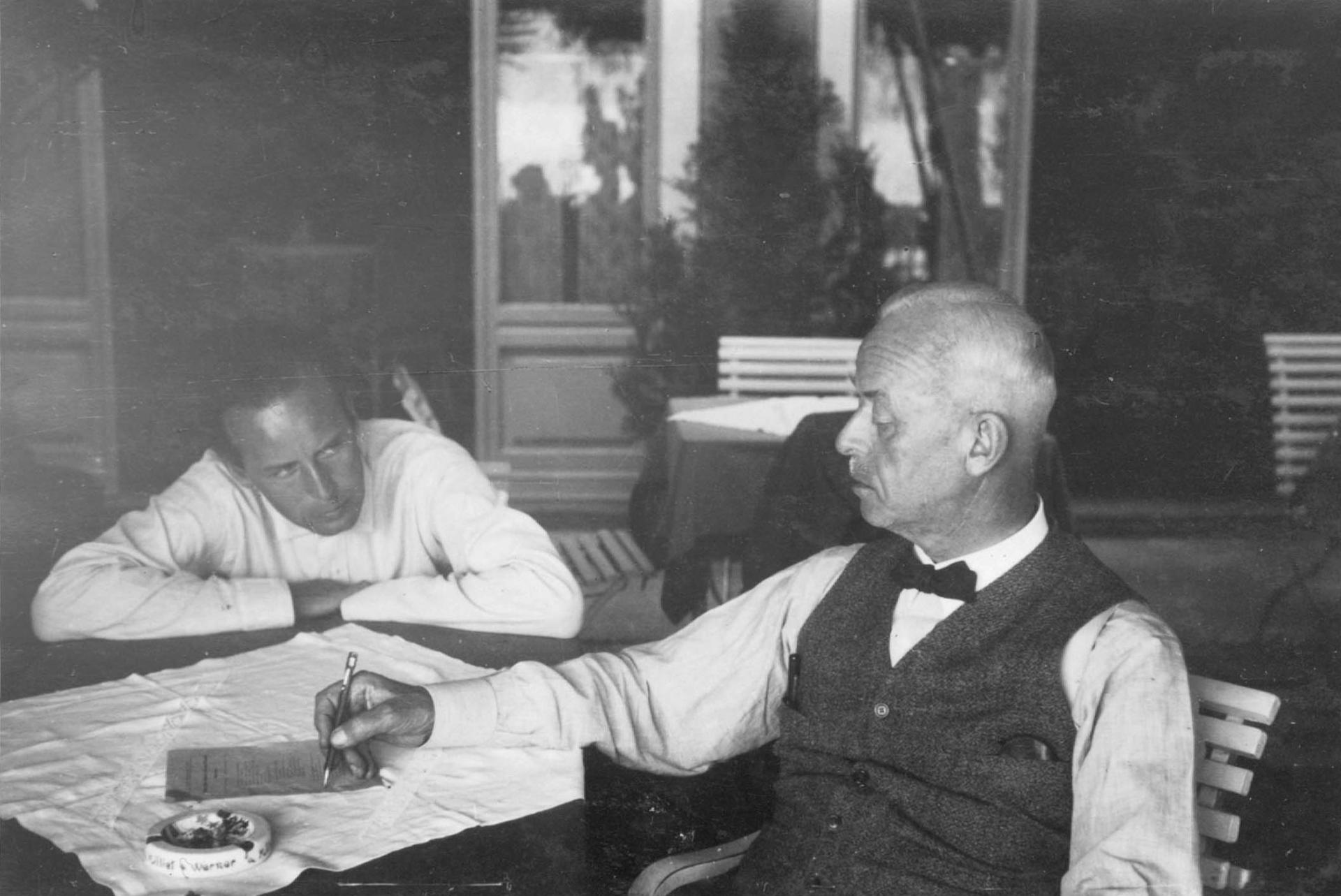
Max Ersnt Haefeli and Max Haefeli Sr. (c. 1930).

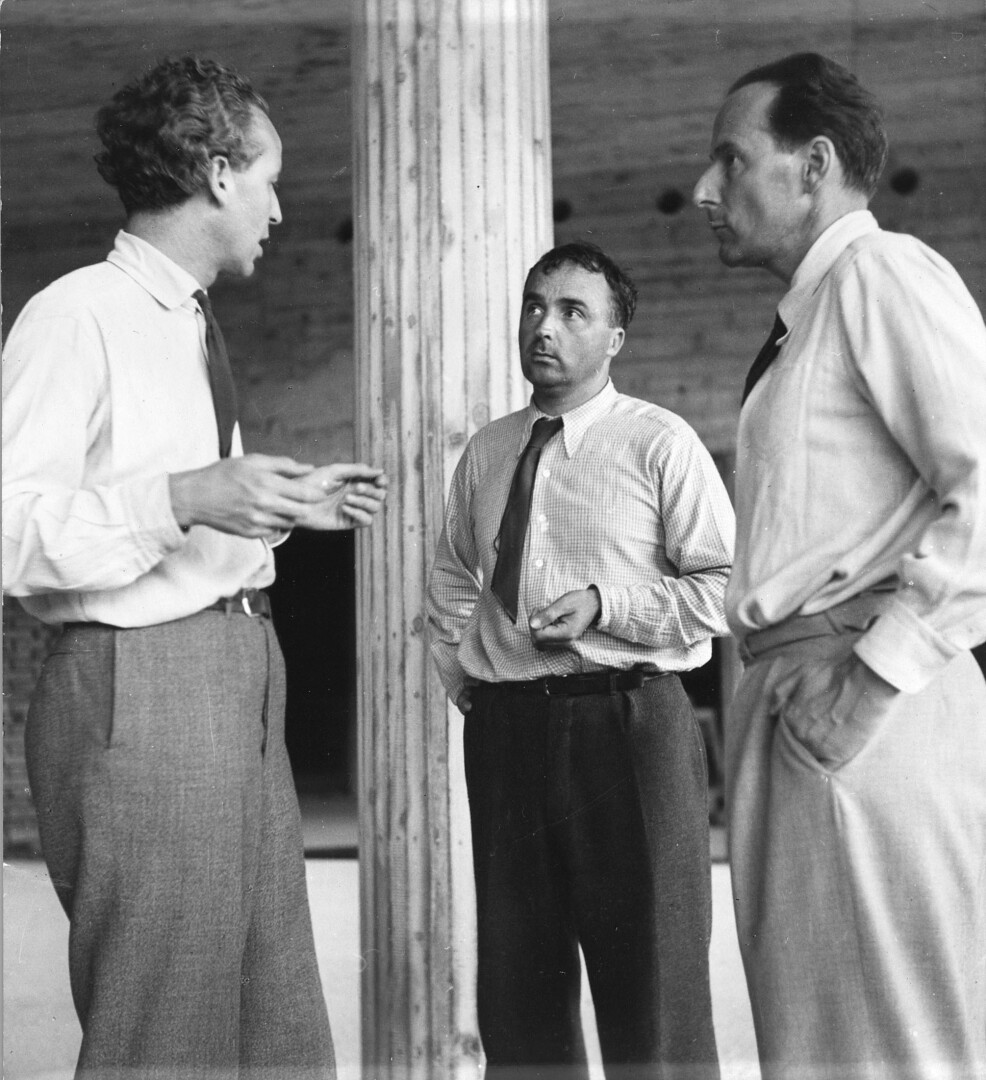
Max Ernst Haefeli, Rudolf Steiger, and Werner M. Moser at the construction of the Kongresshaus Zurich (1939).

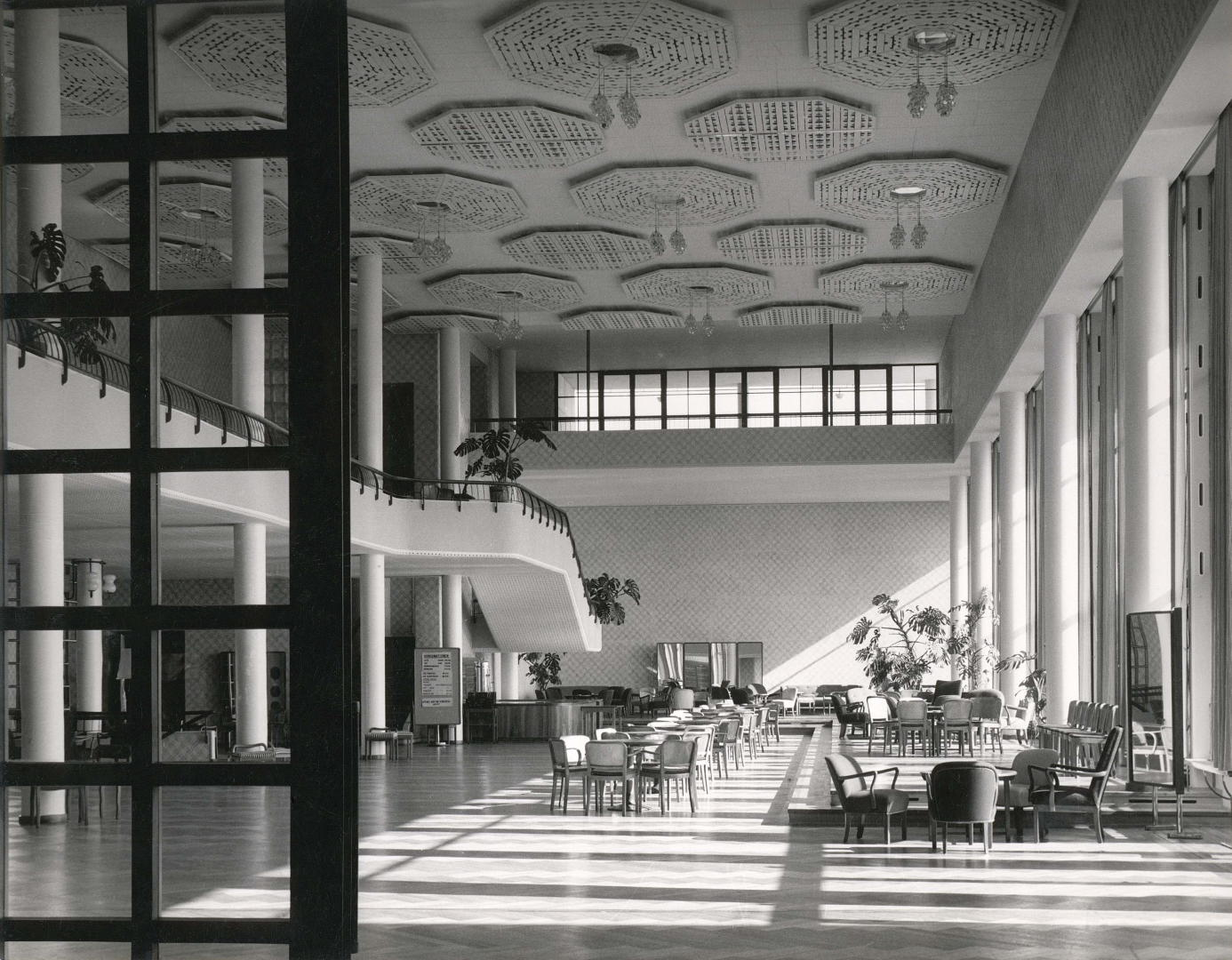
Foyer of the Kongresshaus Zurich. Detailing and furniture by Haefeli (1939).

Max Ernst Haefeli (25 January 1901 – 17 June 1976) was a Swiss architect, furniture designer, and co-founder of the Haefeli Moser Steiger (HMS) architectural firm. He subscribed to the New Building architectural school of thought in Switzerland.

== Education and training ==
Haefeli studied architecture at ETH Zurich from 1919 to 1923, under Karl Moser. His graduation project was a design for the Zurich Enge railway station, developed along with fellow students Flora Crawford and Rudolf Steiger.

After completing his training, Haefeli moved to Berlin for a year at the office of Otto Bartning. He returned to Switzerland and worked with his father (Swiss architect Max Haefeli) at the firm of Pfleghard & Haefeli from 1924 to 1925.

== Career and notable works ==
Haefeli opened his own office in 1925, with his first commission being the design of a lakeside house for his aunt Maria Ritter in Erlenbach. In the late 1920s, he collaborated with Ernst Kadler–Vögeli and Swiss manufacturer Möbelfabrik Horgen-Glarus AG on furniture design. He outfitted part of publisher Hans Girsberger's bookshop in 1926. Haefeli set up six model apartments in the Weissenhof estate for Ludwig Mies van der Rohe's apartment building in 1927.

In 1928, Haefeli and 28 prominent European architects of the time formed the Congrès Internationaux d'Architecture Moderne (CIAM) in La Sarraz, Switzerland. The co-founders included Le Corbusier, Sigfried Giedion, Hendrik Berlage, Karl Moser, and his future business partner Werner M. Moser.

From 1938 to 1939, Haefeli, Werner Moser, and garden architect Gustav Ammann designed the Allenmoos open-air swimming pool in Zurich (dubbed Parkbad). With other CIAM members, Haefeli designed the Neubühl housing estate in Wollishofen. He contributed numerous furniture pieces to Wohnbedarf AG, a showroom run by Werner Moser, Rudolf Graber, and Sigfried Giedion from 1931 onwards.

== Haefeli Moser Steiger (HMS) office community ==
In 1933, the Erweiterungsplan der Stadt Bern und ihrer Vororte (lit. 'Expansion Plan of the City of Bern and its Suburbs') competition was conducted in Bern, Switzerland. Haefeli, Rudolf Steiger, and Werner M. Moser won the competition and were awarded a contract for the design of the Kongresshaus Zurich in 1936. This led to the formation of the firm Haefeli Moser Steiger (HMS) on 1 April 1937. The firm existed until 1970 when Moser passed away; it was then renamed Haefeli und Steiger and continued until 1975.

Haefeli was responsible for the construction and detailing works undertaken by HMS. This is evidenced by the exterior design and interiors of the Kongresshaus, Cantonal Hospital (today University Hospital), and administration building of Eternit AG in Niederurnen.

During his time with HMS, Haefeli built numerous houses, including a shingle style house in Wattwil for Toggenburg-based industrialist Rudolf Beherlein (1940–1941) and his own home in Herrliberg (1947–1948).

== See also ==
- Werner M. Moser
- Gustav Ammann
- Haefeli Moser Steiger
