= Gustav Ammann =

Swiss landscape architect (1885–1955)

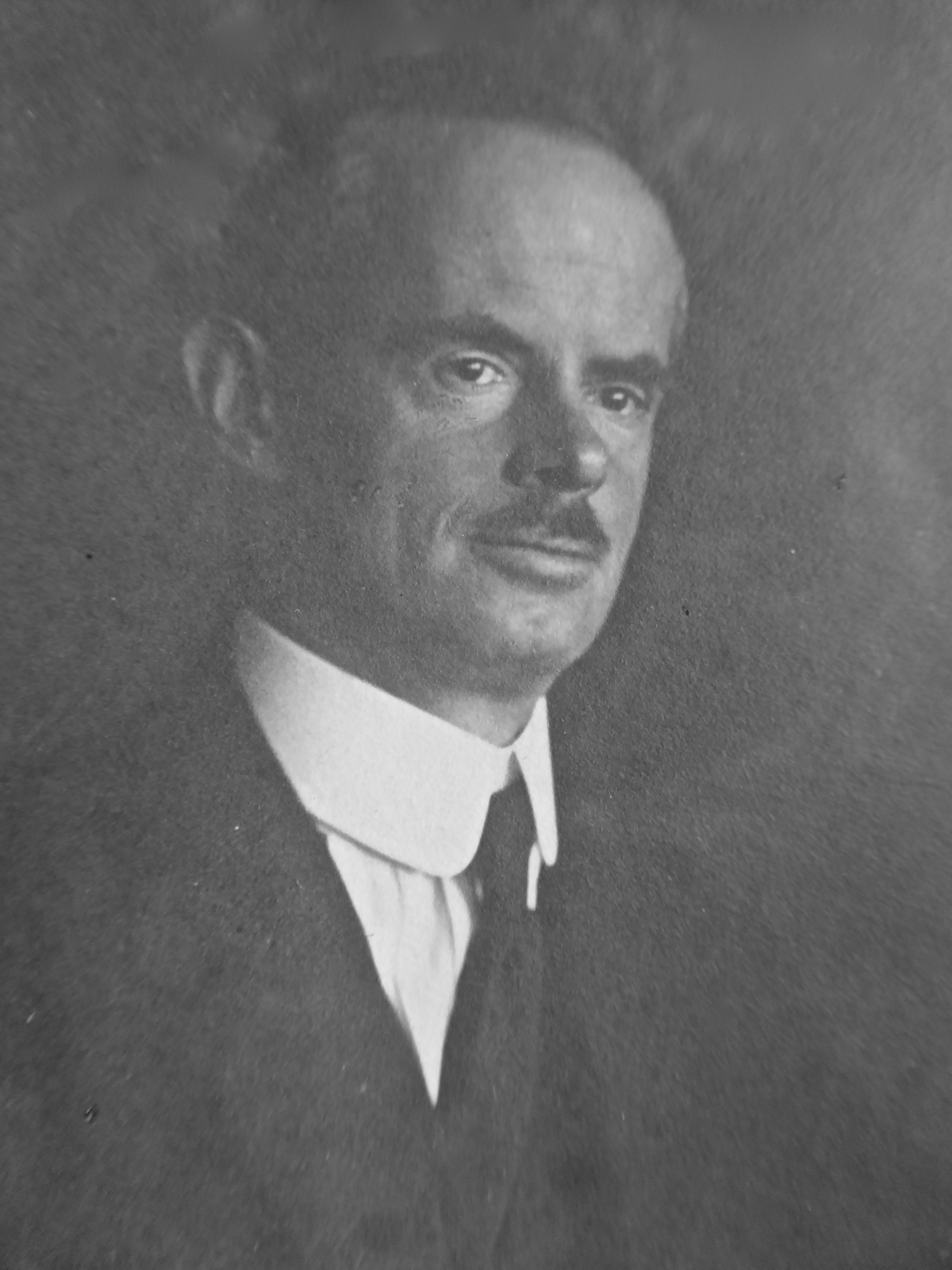
- Gustav Ammann in 1919
- Born: July 9, 1885; Zurich, Switzerland
- Died: March 23, 1955 (aged 69); Zurich, Switzerland
- Education: ETH Zurich, University of Zurich
- Occupation: Architect
- Children: 1

Gustav Ammann (9 July 1885 – 23 March 1955) was a Swiss landscape architect who worked in the modernist style and influenced garden architecture in Switzerland. He has worked on over 1,700 projects, including the namesake Gustav Ammann Park in Zürich.

== Early years and training ==
Ammann was the son of the president of the Bürgli District Court in Zurich-Enge and grew up in a middle-class environment. He attended the Cantonal Commercial School, Zurich, but left his federal diploma in favor of an apprenticeship with a landscaping company run by Leopold Frobel from 1903 to 1905. There, he trained as an apprentice gardener with Otto Froebel while attending lectures in botany at the University of Zurich and ETH Zurich. He was then employed at the Zurich Botanical Garden, where he attended lectures by its director, Hans Schinz, who also served as a professor of botany at the University of Zurich.

With limited training opportunities in Switzerland, Amman left for Düsseldorf, Germany, in 1907, where he worked with Reinhold Hoemann, a proponent of the reformist architectural style. It was here than he was introduced to, and became a member of, the Deutscher Werkbund. He studied at the Magdeburg School of Arts and Crafts between 1908 and 1911. From 1909 to 1911, he worked at the offices of several landscaping architects, including Franz Paetz (Düsseldorf), Ludwig Lesser, known for the namesake park in Berlin, and Jacob Ochs (Hamburg), where German landscape artist Leberecht Migge later became the artistic director.

== Rise to prominence ==
From 1911 until the company was dissolved in 1933, Ammann served as chief garden architect at Otto Froebel and Heirs, where he trained the Austrian-American architect Richard Neutra as a gardener's apprentice, and later the landscape architect Ernst Cramer. During those years, he was also associated with the Schweizerischer Werkbund (translated as Swiss Werkbund).

In 1933, Ammann set up his studio in Zurich. He frequently collaborated with notable Swiss architects of the time, including Max Frisch, Max Ernst Haefeli, Werner Max Moser, Rudolf Steiger, and members of the Congrès Internationaux d'Architecture Moderne (CIAM). Ammann went on to become President of the Swiss Federation of Garden Designers (BSG) and the Secretary General of the International Federation of Landscape Architects (IFLA).

In 1942, his son - Peter Ammann (1919-2011), joined his studio and eventually became a partner in 1952.

== Notable projects ==
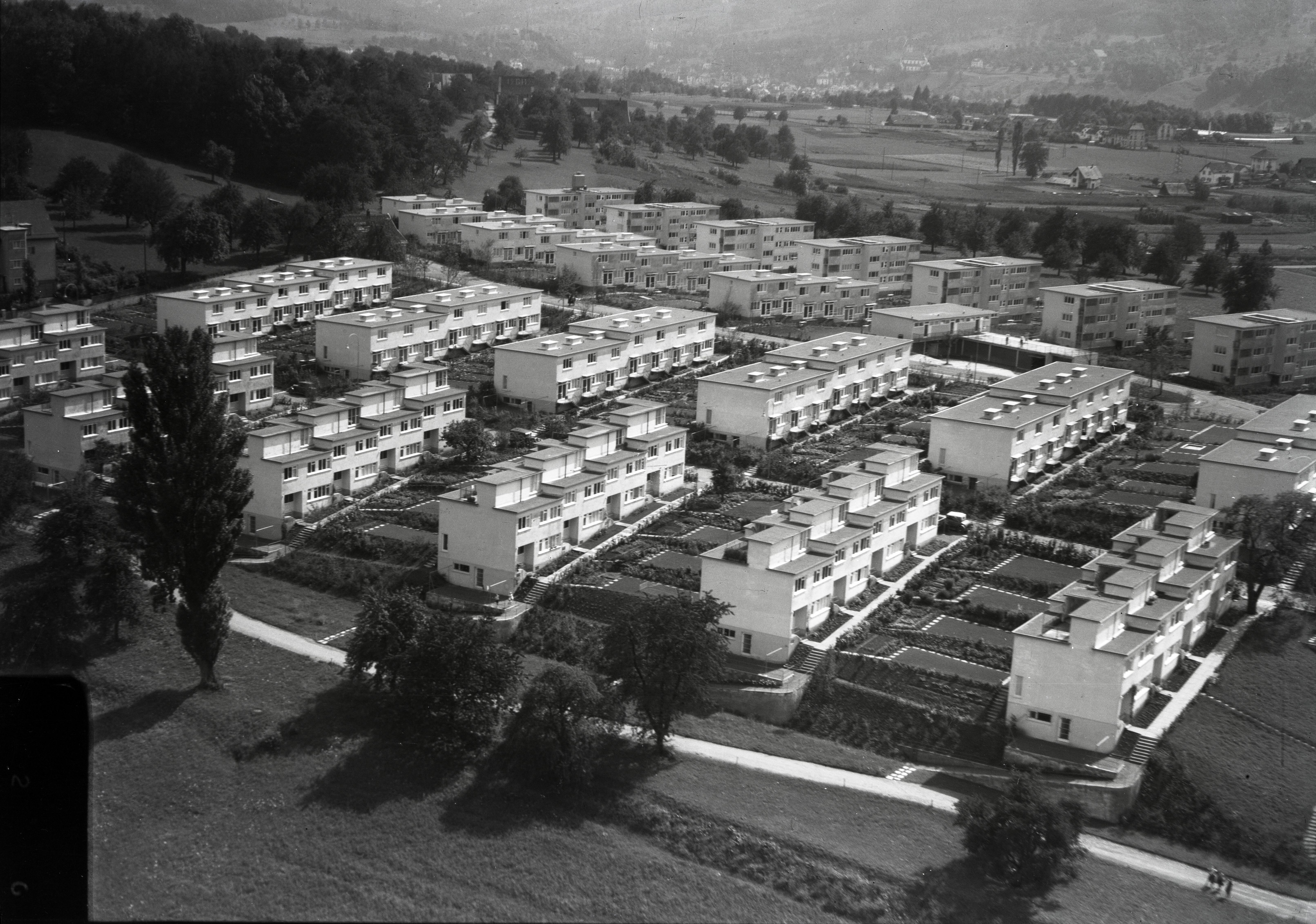
Neubühl Wollishofen, with gardens designed by Ammann

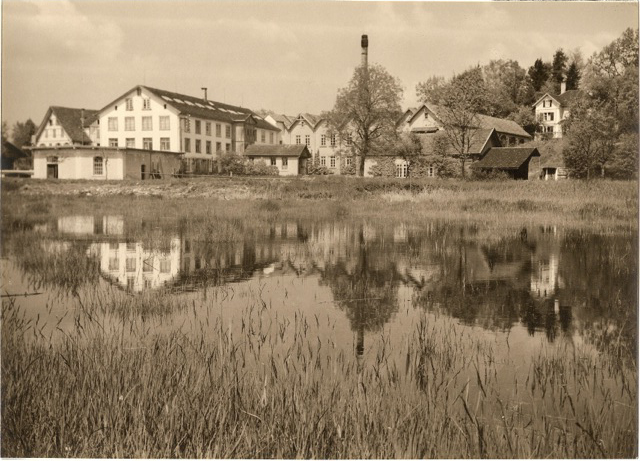
Villa Bodmer und Hürlimann, designed by Ammann, on the upper right edge. To the left is the old factory of Bodmer und Hürlimann

Ammann was affiliated with many projects across Switzerland, designing their gardens and landscapes. Among his early notable projects was the landscaping of the Villa Bodmer und Hürlimann for the silk industrialists Karl Bodmer and F. Hürlimann in Ottenbach (1914). In 1917, Amman contributed to the Architecture garden at the Werkbund in Bern (1917), showcasing his evolving approach to design in a public setting.

Through the 1930s, Ammann was deeply involved in urban and residential planning, viz., the Neubühl residential project in Zürich (1930–1932) and the Park of the Kilchberg Sanatorium (1931–1932). His expertise also extended to large-scale public spaces, such as the Freibad Allenmoos open-air swimming pool in Zürich (1936–1939) and the gardens for the Swiss National Exhibition, Zurich (1939).

In 1942, Ammann, in collaboration with architect Robert Winkler, designed the Wohlfahrtsgarten der Firma Bührle (today known as the Gustav Amman Park) in Oerlikon. He also contributed to the Winterthur Cantonal Hospital and University Hospital in Zurich from 1942–1953.

Ammann's role in shaping Zurich's infrastructure extended to the landscape of the Zurich Airport in Kloten (1946–1949). Collaborating with architect Max Frisch, he worked on the Freibad Letzigraben open-air swimming pool in Zürich (1947–1949). One of his final projects was the Heiligfeld III residential colony, designed with city architect Albert H. Steiner (completed in 1955).

== Death ==
Gustav Ammann died in Zurich on March 23, 1955 at the age of 69.

== Publications ==
Ammann authored nearly 230 books during his lifetime, most of which are on the subject of his garden and landscape ideologies. Some of his prominent works are:

- Yvonne Aellen et al.: Parkanlagen in Neu-Oerlikon: Oerliker Park, MFO-Park, Louis-Häfliger-Park, Wahlenpark, Gustav-Ammann-Park. Grün Stadt Zürich (Hrsg.), Zürich 2004.
- Gustav Ammann: Blühende Gärten. Erlenbach-Zürich 1955.
- Annemarie Bucher: Vom Landschaftsgarten zur Gartenlandschaft: Gartenkunst zwischen 1880 und 1980 im Archiv für Schweizer Gartenarchitektur und Landschaftsplanung. vdf Hochschulverlag AG, Zürich 1996.
- Luc Lienhard: Ammann, Gustav. In: Historisches Lexikon der Schweiz.
- Johannes Stoffler: Eine Blühende Badelandschaft. In: Ulrich Binder, Pierre Geering (Hrsg.): Freibad Letzigraben. Von Max Frisch und Gustav Ammann. Verlag Neue Zürcher Zeitung, Zürich 2007, ISBN 978-3-03823-378-7.
- Johannes Stoffler: Gustav Ammann. Landschaften der Moderne. gta Verlag, Zürich 2008, ISBN 978-3-85676-194-3.
- Udo Weilacher: Visionäre Gärten. Die modernen Landschaften von Ernst Cramer. Birkhäuser, Basel/Berlin/Boston 2001, ISBN 3764365684.
