= Helmut Bertalanffy =

German neurosurgeon

Helmut Bertalanffy is the director of the Department of Vascular Neurosurgery, at the International Neuroscience Institute in Hanover.

== Career ==
Bertalanffy completed his studies of human medicine at the Albert Ludwig's University of Freiburg/Breisgau in 1983. He received his doctorate in 1986 and has been a specialist of neurosurgery since 1990. From 1990 to 1992, he was scientifically active as a scholarship holder of the Alexander von Humboldt Foundation (Bonn) and the Japan Society for the Promotion of Science (Tokyo, Japan) in Tokyo at Keio University. In 1992 he returned to Germany and took over the position of senior physician of the Department of the Neurosurgical Clinic at the RWTH Aachen University. The habilitation took place in 1994. For his habilitation thesis, he received the "Friedrich Wilhelm Award" of the Friedrich Wilhelm Foundation of RWTH Aachen for outstanding scientific achievements. In 1996, Bertalanffy was appointed the chair of neurosurgery by the University of Marburg, where he held the position of hospital director from 1997 to 2007. In 2007 he moved to Zurich as Director of the Neurosurgical University Hospital of Zürich. Since 2011 he has been the Director of Vascular Neurosurgery at the International Neuroscience Institute in Hanover.

== Areas of specialisation ==
Bertalanffy's areas of speciality are vascular neurosurgery and subcranial surgery. His focuses of treatment here are brain stem cavernomas and gliomas, complex subcranial lesions, deep-seated brain tumours, as well as brain vascular aneurysms and lesions at the craniocervical transition.

== Scientific achievements ==
Due to his scientific contributions in the fields of vascular neurosurgery, microsurgery of brain stem lesions and subcranial surgery, Bertalanffy held more than 400 presentations as a guest speaker at numerous international conferences.

He also served twelve years as editor-in-chief of the scientific journal Neurosurgical Review (2004 - 2016) and is active as a reviewer for several international neurosurgical journals. He has published over 180 essays as the primary or co-author in peer-reviewed journals as well as more than 50 book chapters and other technical contributions. The majority of publications can be found on Pubmed.

== Memberships ==
· Member of the German Society of Neurosurgery

· Member of the German Academy of Neurosurgery

· Founding member of the World Academy of Neurosurgery

· Member of the Skull Base and the Nominating Committee of the World Federation of Neurological Surgeons (WFNS)

· Former Chairman of the Nominating Committee of WFNS

· Member of the International Advisory Board of the American Association of Neurological Surgeons

· Member of the Academia Eurasiana

· Member of the Asian Congress of Neurological Surgeons

· Corresponding Member of the American Academy of Neurological Surgeons

· Honorary member of the Italian and the Romanian Companies of Neurosurgery
