= Hans-Christoph Pape =

German trauma and orthopaedic surgeon

Hans-Christoph Pape is a German surgeon and trauma surgeon and was appointed full professor of traumatology at the Medical Faculty of the University of Zurich on 31 October 2016, effective 1 February 2017. He heads the Department of Traumatology at the University Hospital Zurich. In particular, his research on polytrauma, pelvic fractures and severe joint injuries (articular) helped him to achieve a high international profile. From 2005 to 2009, he was head of the trauma surgery department at the University of Pittsburgh Medical Center (UPMC), Pittsburgh, USA. From 2009 to 2016, he was head of the Department of Trauma and Reconstructive Surgery at the University Hospital RWTH Aachen. Since March 2018, he has also once again been an adjunct professor at the University of Pittsburgh Medical Center (UPMC), Pittsburgh.

== Education ==
Pape studied human medicine at Hannover Medical School from 1981 to 1988 and subsequently trained there as a specialist surgeon from 1989 to 1995. In 1989, he received his doctorate in Hanover with the dissertation titled: Wirkungen von Iloprost auf die lysosomale Membran des Katzenhirns promoviert (Effects of Iloprost on the Lysosomal Membrane of the Cat Brain). This was followed by the overlapping specialist qualification in orthopaedics and trauma surgery (2010). This was followed by the overarching specialist qualification in orthopaedics and trauma surgery (2010). He received his additional training in trauma surgery from Harald Tscherne (1996). During this time he devoted himself to polytrauma (injuries to several regions of the body), pelvic fractures and severe joint injuries and habilitated in this field (1996).

== Career ==
In 2000, he was appointed Professor of Trauma Surgery at the Hannover Medical School. From 2003 to 2005 he was a visiting professor at Massachusetts General Hospital, Boston, the University of Leeds, McGill University Health Centre in Montreal, the University of Colorado Denver, the University of Alabama in Birmingham, the University of Texas in El Paso, Ganga Medical Center & Hospitals, Coimbatore (India), the University of New York at Buffalo, the University of Mississippi Medical Center in Jackson, Vanderbilt University, Nashville, Tennessee, Horten General Hospital, Banbury, Oxford, among others. From 2005 to 2009, Pape was head of the Department of Trauma Surgery at the University of Pittsburgh Medical Center UPMC, Pittsburgh, USA. Since 2009, he has been Clinic Director of the Department of Trauma and Reconstructive Surgery at RWTH Aachen University Hospital. In November 2016, he was elected to succeed Hans-Peter Simmen as Director of the Clinic for Trauma Surgery at the University Hospital Zurich and as Full Professor of Traumatology at the Medical Faculty of the University of Zurich. He took up the post on 1 February 2017.

== Academic societies ==
Hans-Christoph Pape is a fellow of several societies as follows: Fellow of the American College of Surgeons (FACS), Fellow of the European Board of Surgery (FEBS) and Fellow of the American Association of Orthopaedic Surgeons (FAAOS). He also has a qualification in emergency medicine and physical therapy (July 2014).

Hans-Christoph Pape is the lead author of more than 90 and co-author of more than 400 scientific articles. His h-index stands at 83, his current ResearchGate score at 50.43. He is the editor and co-editor of several textbooks.

== Books ==
- Empfehlungen zur Diagnostik und Therapie der Schockformen: der IAG Schock der DIVI. Deutscher Ärzte-Verlag. 2005. ISBN 978-3-7691-1214-6.
- Giannoudis, Peter V; Pape, Hans-Christoph, eds. (2014). Practical Procedures in Orthopaedic Trauma Surgery. doi:10.1017/CBO9780511862328. ISBN 978-0-511-86232-8.
- Pape, Hans-Christoph; Peitzman, Andrew; Schwab, C. William; Giannoudis, Peter V, eds. (2010). Damage Control Management in the Polytrauma Patient. doi:10.1007/978-0-387-89508-6. ISBN 978-0-387-89507-9.
- Pape, Hans C; Weber, Timothy G (2010). Autologous techniques to fill bone defects for acute fractures and nonunions. Saunders/Elsevier. ISBN 978-1-4377-1847-8.
- Pape, Hans-Christoph; Sanders, Roy; Borrelli, Joseph, eds. (2011). The Poly-Traumatized Patient with Fractures. doi:10.1007/978-3-642-17986-0. ISBN 978-3-642-17985-3.
- Pape, Hans-Christoph; Hildebrand, Frank; Ruchholtz, Steffen, eds. (2018). Management des Schwerverletzten. doi:10.1007/978-3-662-54980-3. ISBN 978-3-662-54979-7.
- Pape, Hans-Christoph; Kates, Stephen L; Hierholzer, Christian; Bischoff-Ferrari, Heike A, eds. (2022). Senior Trauma Patients. doi:10.1007/978-3-030-91483-7. ISBN 978-3-030-91482-0. S2CID 247455327.
- Pape, Hans-Christoph, Borelli Jr., Joseph., Moore, Ernest E., Pfeifer Roman, Stahel Philip F.: Textbook of Polytrauma Management. A Multidisciplinary Approach. 3rd Edition. Springer Verlag 2022.
- Kalbas, Yannik, Pape, Hans-Christoph (2022). The Relevance of the Timing of Surgical Interventions. Chapter, page 81-87, Postinjurgy Multiple Organ Failure, . Springer Verlag 2022. Book Series, part of Hot Topics in Acute Care Surgery and Trauma

== Awards and honours ==
- OREF Clinical Research Award 2008

== Committees and positions ==
In 2002, he established a then new course concept for the treatment of multiply injured patients, named Polytrauma Course in cooperation with Peter Giannoudis of the University of Leeds, which achieved recognition at international specialists’ conventions. He also directed the trauma group of the Société Internationale de Chirurgie Orthopédique et de Traumatologie (SICOT)] between 2015 and 2020. He is likewise a member of the founding committee of the Orthopaedic Trauma Association (OTA).

Pape has chaired the International Committee of the Orthopaedic Trauma Association since 2019. He chaired the Polytrauma Section of the European Society for Trauma and Emergency Surgery (ESTES) until May, 2023, He was President of the European Society for Trauma and Emergency Surgery (ESTES) from 2015 to 2016. He has been the General Secretary of the European Society for Trauma and Emergency Surgery (ESTES) since May 2023.
