= Ashu (given name) =

Ashu is an Indian male given name. Notable people include:

- Ashu, American soloist
- Ashu Bedra (born 1990), Indian film producer
- Ashu Dani (born 1974), Indian cricketer
- Ashu Malik (born 1983), Indian politician
- Ashu Sharma (born 1982), Indian television actor
- Ashu Trikha (born 1969), Indian film actor
- Aishu or Ashu, nickname of Indian actress Aishwarya Rai
