= Hélène de Mandrot =

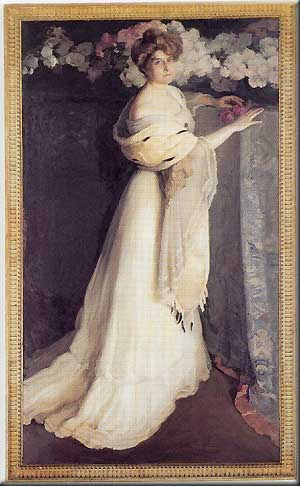
- Born: 27 November 1867
- Died: 26 December 1948 (aged 81)
- Occupations: Artist, Patron

Hélène de Mandrot (1867-1948), née Hélène Revilliod de Muralt, was an artist and Swiss patron of modern art and architecture.

== Biography ==
Born into a Swiss patrician family in Geneva, Hélène de Mandrot grew up amid the intellectual, cultural and economic elite of the time. She studied at the Académie Julian in Paris.

De Mandrot is the cofounder of the Museum Society of the La Sarraz Castle in the canton de Vaud, a Swiss national heritage site of significance. As an art collector, she strongly supported the modern movement and used the castle to organize artist reunions such as the Congrès Internationaux d'Architecture Moderne in 1928 and the Congrès international du cinéma indépendant in 1929. She is also a co-founder of the CIAM.
