= Ashu =

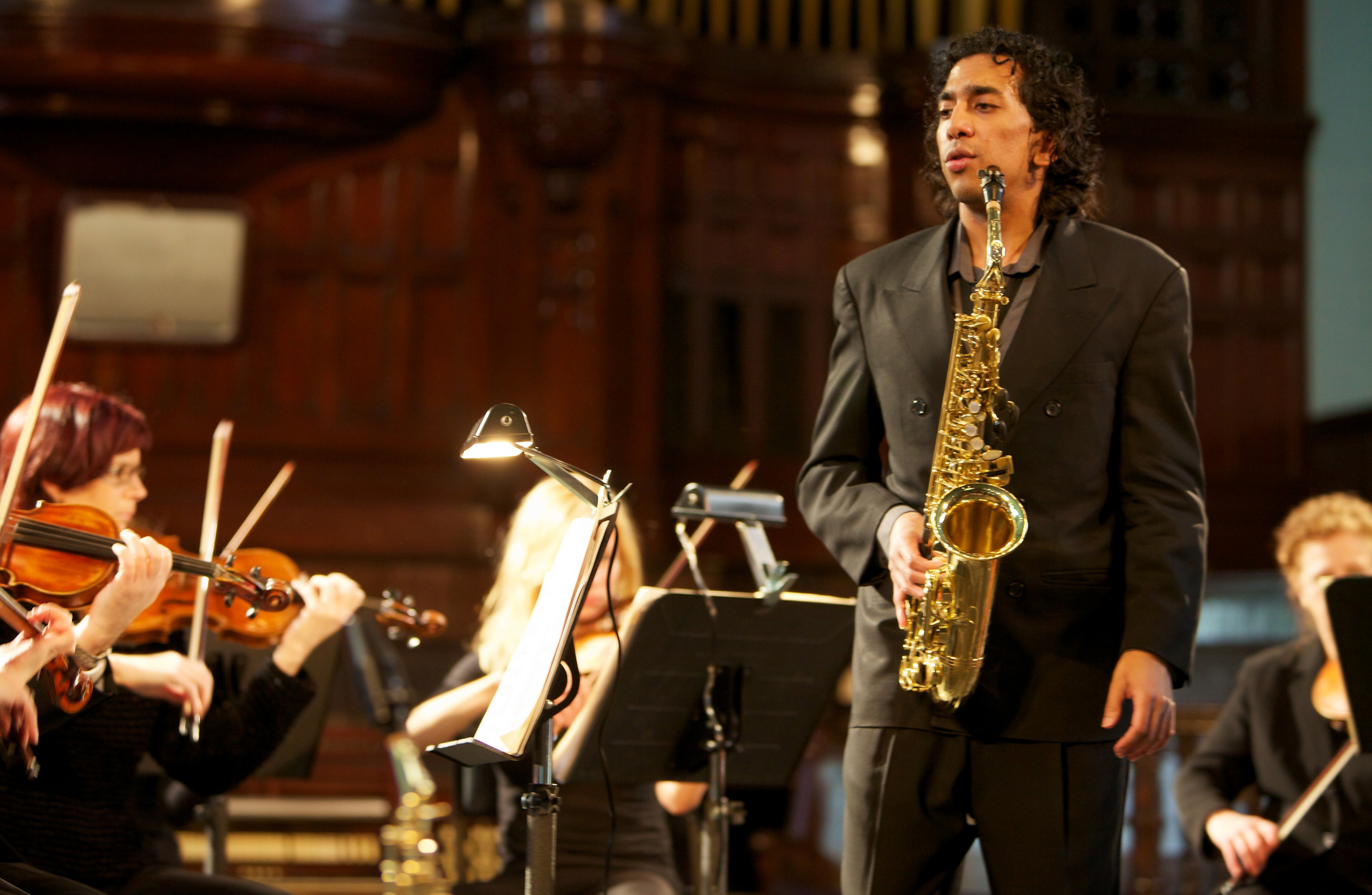

Background information
- Born: Ashu; California, United States
- Genres: Classical
- Occupation: Musician
- Instrument: Saxophone
- Website: ashuonline.com

Ashu is an American saxophone soloist. He has won numerous international and national awards and has performed solo concerts throughout the world. He has developed a trailblazing career as the first and only full-time concert saxophone soloist.

== Biography and career ==
Ashu has performed solo concerts throughout Great Britain, Finland, Norway, Russia, South Africa, New Zealand, Switzerland, France, Germany, Austria, Portugal, French West Indies, Kyrgyzstan, Poland, Bulgaria, Estonia, Canada, and the USA.

Ashu has been praised by critics for his charismatic and communicative performance style. The Chicago Tribune stated that he "possesses a deep musicality which pours through his playing and hooks the audience" and the Dallas Morning News claimed "he’s just as much fun to watch as to listen to."

He has performed recitals and concertos with orchestras at venues including Carnegie Hall, Ravinia Festival, Vienna Konzerthaus, Zurich Tonhalle, and Kravis Center. In 2008, he performed with the Naumburg Orchestral Concerts, in the Naumburg Bandshell, Central Park, in the summer series.

He has recently been invited to perform concertos with major orchestras in Vienna, New York City, Chicago, St. Petersburg, Lisbon, Montreal, Bremen, Edmonton, Cape Town, Prague, and more.

Ashu was selected as the winner of the prestigious "Audience Award" at the renowned International Musical Olympus Festival in St. Petersburg, Russia, competing against the First Prize winners of the world’s foremost string, piano and voice competitions. The festival’s honorary committee included Yo-Yo Ma, Daniel Barenboim, and Valery Gergiev.

He has been featured in interview and performance on NBC, CBS, NPR, and more.

== Personal, influences ==
Ashu currently is based in the Chicago area. On several occasions he has expressed his influence and admiration for artists including Luciano Pavarotti, Jascha Heifetz, and Frank Sinatra. Ashu also arranges works for saxophone which he performs in his concerts.

== Awards and successes ==
Winner: International Musical Olympus Festival “Audience Award” (St. Petersburg, Russia), Salon De Virtuosi Career Grant (NYC), International Houston Symphony Concerto Competition, National KSO Concerto Competition, National SVSO Concerto Competition, W.A.F.A Concerto Competition, Interlochen Governor's Award, (Grand Prize) Houston Symphony Flores-Smith Competition, Northwestern University Concerto Competition.

First Prizes: American Opera Society Competition, International Heida Hermanns Competition, National Federation of Music Clubs Competition, National Midland-Odessa Competition, International Kingsville Wind Instrumentalist Competition, National Lennox Competition, National George S. Howard Competition, National Alliance for Excellence Competition.
