= Louis Herman De Koninck =

Belgian architect and designer

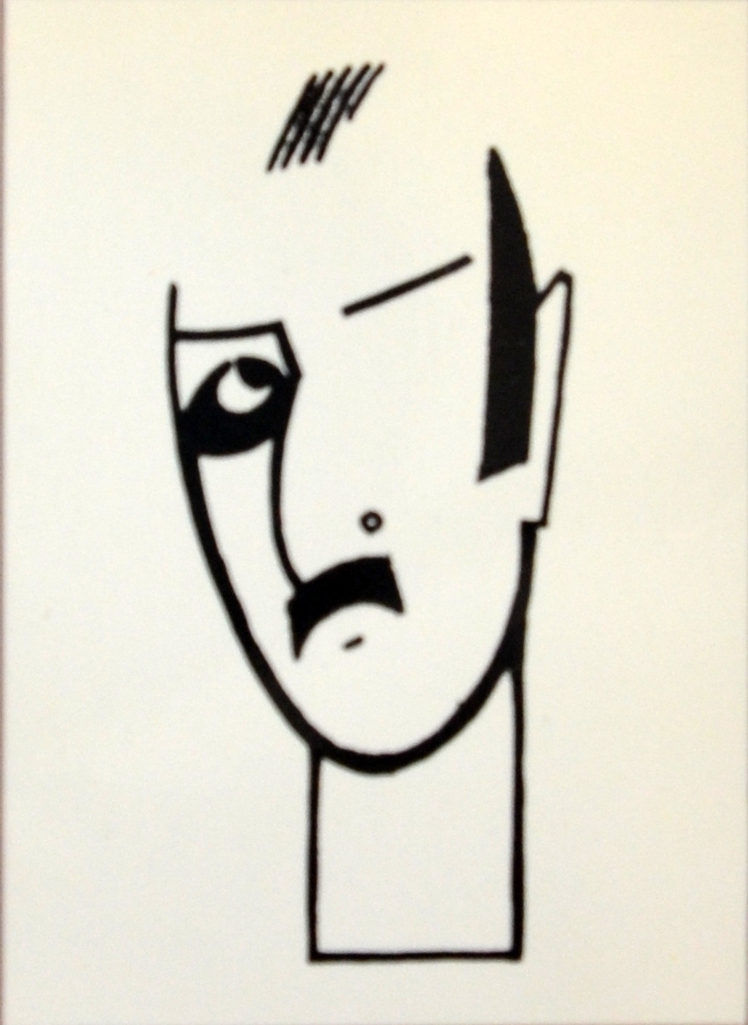
- Portrait of L.H. De Koninck (1924)
- Born: 31 March 1896
- Died: 21 October 1984 (aged 88)
- Occupations: architect, designer
- Known for: modern architecture
- Notable work: houses in Belgium

Louis Herman De Koninck (31 March 1896 – 21 October 1984) was a Belgian architect and designer.

One of the leading Belgian architects of the 20th century, De Koninck developed an original form of modernism and constructivism architecture. Not a theoretician, L H De Koninck has rooted his design in the in-depth understanding of popular architecture developed by farmers on the Belgian sea shore. He spent many years copying these natural design, and maintained a deep sense of them all his life even when expressed through the most modern concepts and breakthrough use of lights and space in the 1920s.

The growing corpus of publications on L.H. De Koninck, reflects the increased recognition of the importance of his work for Modern Architecture.

"History makers are often ignored for too long like the Californian architect Rudolf Schindler (1887-1953) whose career runs parallel to that of Louis-H De Koninck; it was only during the sixties that his work was examined for the first time then discovered and eventually revealed.

It is no doubt owing to the detailed study, by the Archive of Modern Architecture in Brussels (since 1968) that De Koninck was mentioned in Michel Ragon's historical work and correctly situated in the "Visual History of Twentieth-Century architecture" in which Dennis Sharp compares the Lenglet Villa, built by De Koninck in 1926, with the houses which Gropius built in Dessau in 1925–1926 and the famous House of Fallingwater built about the same time in Bear Run by F.L. Wright (in order to illustrate the fundamental divergence which exist between a striking illustration of European doctrinaire functionalism - closed forms, square plan, endless surfaces of the white envelope - and the stimulated spatial character of American organic architecture based upon daring plan and articulations).

"De Koninck realized some of his most notable works prior to the founding of CIAM; namely his own house (1924), Lenglet House (1926) and Haverbeke house (1927). The Lenglet house in particular rise above the usual level of functionalism. It is one of the finest examples of international architecture in the twenties, on a par with Rietved's Schroeder house (1924) and Le Corbusier's Cook house (1926), without being derivative of either De Stijl movement or the "Esprit Nouveau". Despite some evident foreign influences, its highly original facade expresses its specific origins within the Belgian architectural tradition".

== Professional activity, highlights ==
- 1929 - Becomes member of the Belgian section of the Congrès International d'Architecture Moderne (CIAM)

== Houses ==
- 1924, personal House, avenue Fond'roy 105, 1180 Brussels. Proposed for the Minimal House of the CIAM exposition in Frankfurt, 1929
- 1926, Lenglet House, avenue Fond'roy 103, 1180 Brussels. Fourth prize Van de Ven 1929, published in La Cite Nr9,1929; Stein-Holtz-Eisen, Francfurt, Nr34,1929; Bauwarte, Coln, Nr33,1929; etc...
- 1929, The Haverbeke House, avenue Brassine, Brussels
- 1931, Villa Canneel, avenue I. Gerard, Brussels. Le Corbusier had made a project for the Canneel house in 1929, which has been replaced by De Koninck's. Unfortunately the house has been destroyed in 1970.
- 1932, Philippe Dotremont House, rue de l'Echevinage, Brussels. A very fine example of De Koninck's architecture, built for a rich art collector, and still in its original condition.
- 1933, Villa of parents L.H De Koninck, Godinne.
- 1934, Villa of the Docteur Ley, avenue Prince d'Orange, Brussels. An application of Le Corbusier's building principles.
- 1934, Villa Nisot, Rhode-St-Genèse.
- 1936, Workshop for the sculptor Puvrez, avenue du Prince d'Orange, Brussels.
- 1936, Group of 6 small houses, 5 flats and 1 shop, Coghen Square, Brussels.
- 1936, Fond'Roy Residence, Avenue de Foestraets, Brussels.
- 1936, Villa Berteaux, avenue du Fort Jaco, Brussels. A powerful example of a modernist frontage composition.
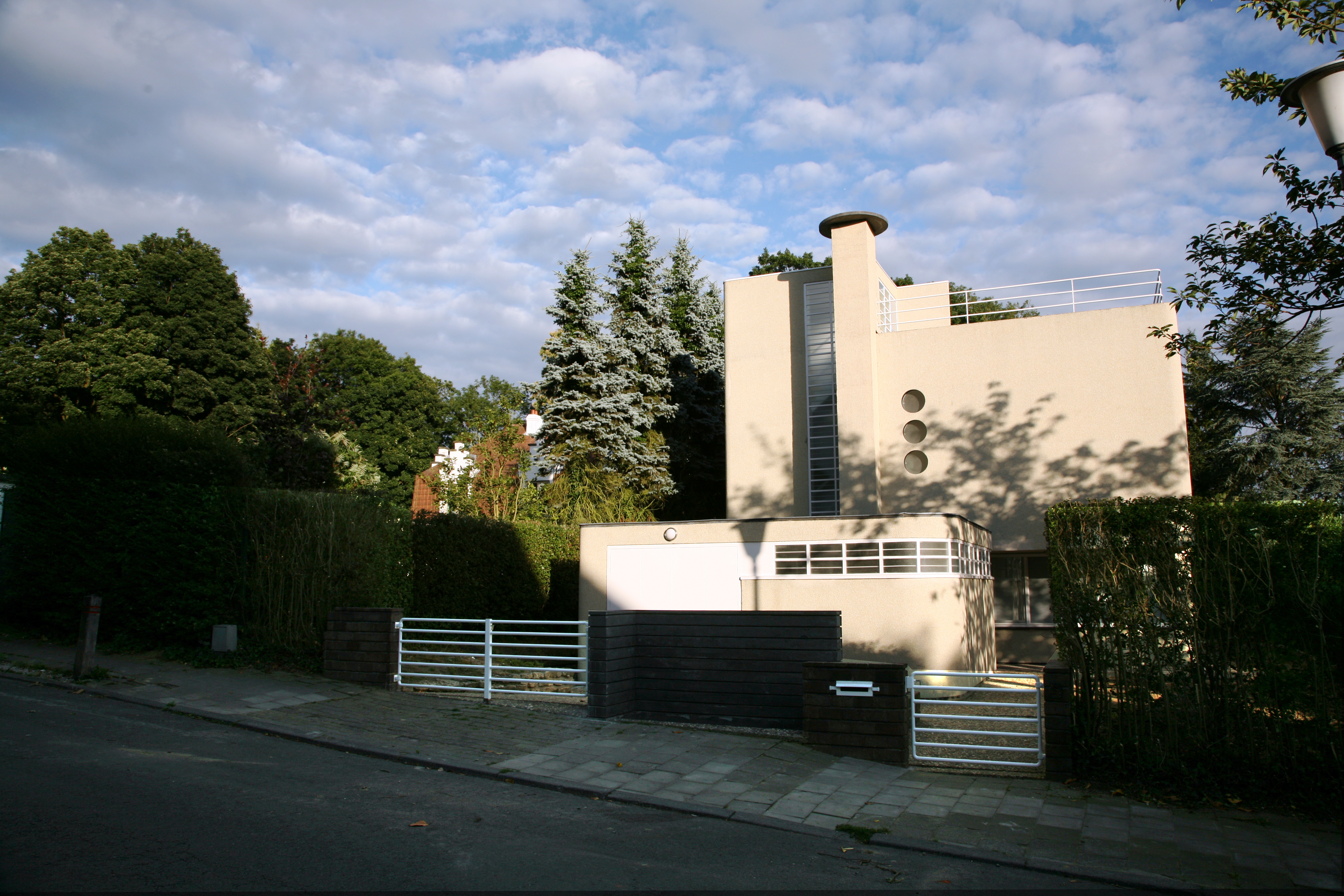
- 1937, Villa of Mr Nice, "Villa Paquebot", Le Zoute.
- 1938, Engineer Franck's House. avenue de l'Uruguay, Brussels.
- 1949, Sea Bungalows for Mr Gobert, Oostduinkerke.
- 1951, Villa "Les Acacias", avenue des Hautes Dunes, Coxyde.
- 1965, Gobert's House, avenue Fabiola, Sterrebeek.
- 1968, W De Koninck's Building, avenue Louise, Brussels. 8 levels building with imaginative building principles.

== Furnitures, Glass work, tapestries,... ==
De Koninck also designed furniture, glasswork and tapestries for his own houses.

1930, He was the main designer of the CUBEX kitchen, a truly innovative modular and standardised kitchen furniture system, which was a collective creation of the Belgian Members of the CIAM. These Rational Kitchens were very popular with the bourgeoisie and installed in many houses in Belgium. They were discontinued in the late 1960s.

== Bibliography ==
A growing corpus of publication is made possible thanks to a legacy of LH De K to the Belgian Archives d'Architecture Moderne at his death in 1984. It was significant in both scope and size, as he retained extensive records related to his profession.

1970, L.H. De Koning, Editions des Archives d'Architecture Moderne, Brussels 1973, L.H. De Koning, Editions des Archives d'Architecture Moderne, Brussels 1980, L.H. De Koning, Editions des Archives d'Architecture Moderne, Brussels 1989, Louis Herman De Koninck - Architect of Modern Times, Editions des Archives d'Architecture Moderne Brussels

== Recent exhibitions ==
Several exhibitions have been held.

- 2006, Modernism, Victoria & Albert Museum, London - Although not an exhibition on himself, LH De Koning's Canneel house was among the few large scale pictures displayed at the exhibition.
