= Gustav-Ammann-Park =

Public park in Oerlikon, Zurich

Coordinates: 47°24′41″N 8°32′4″E

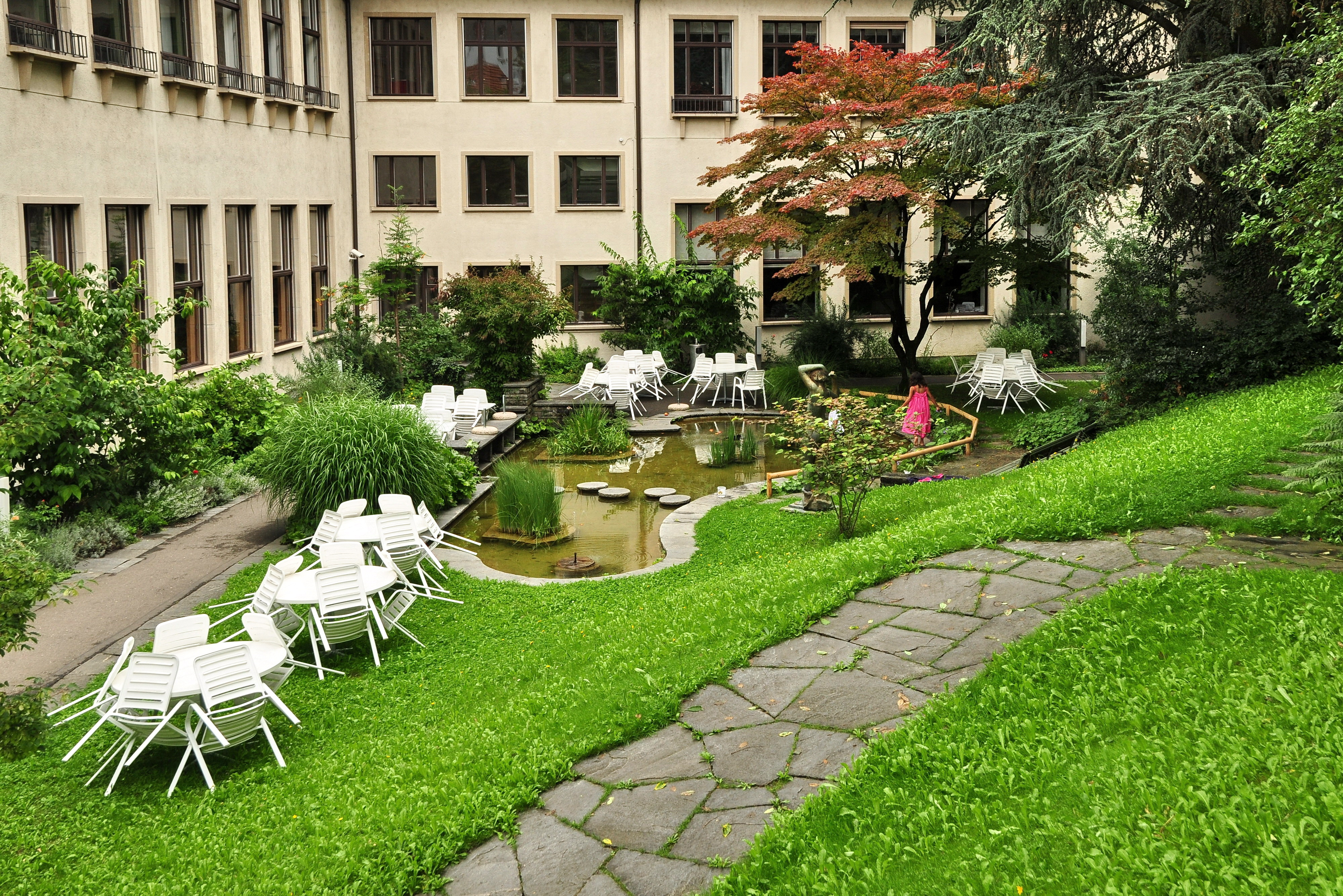
Gustav-Ammann-Park, Haus der Farbe building in the background.

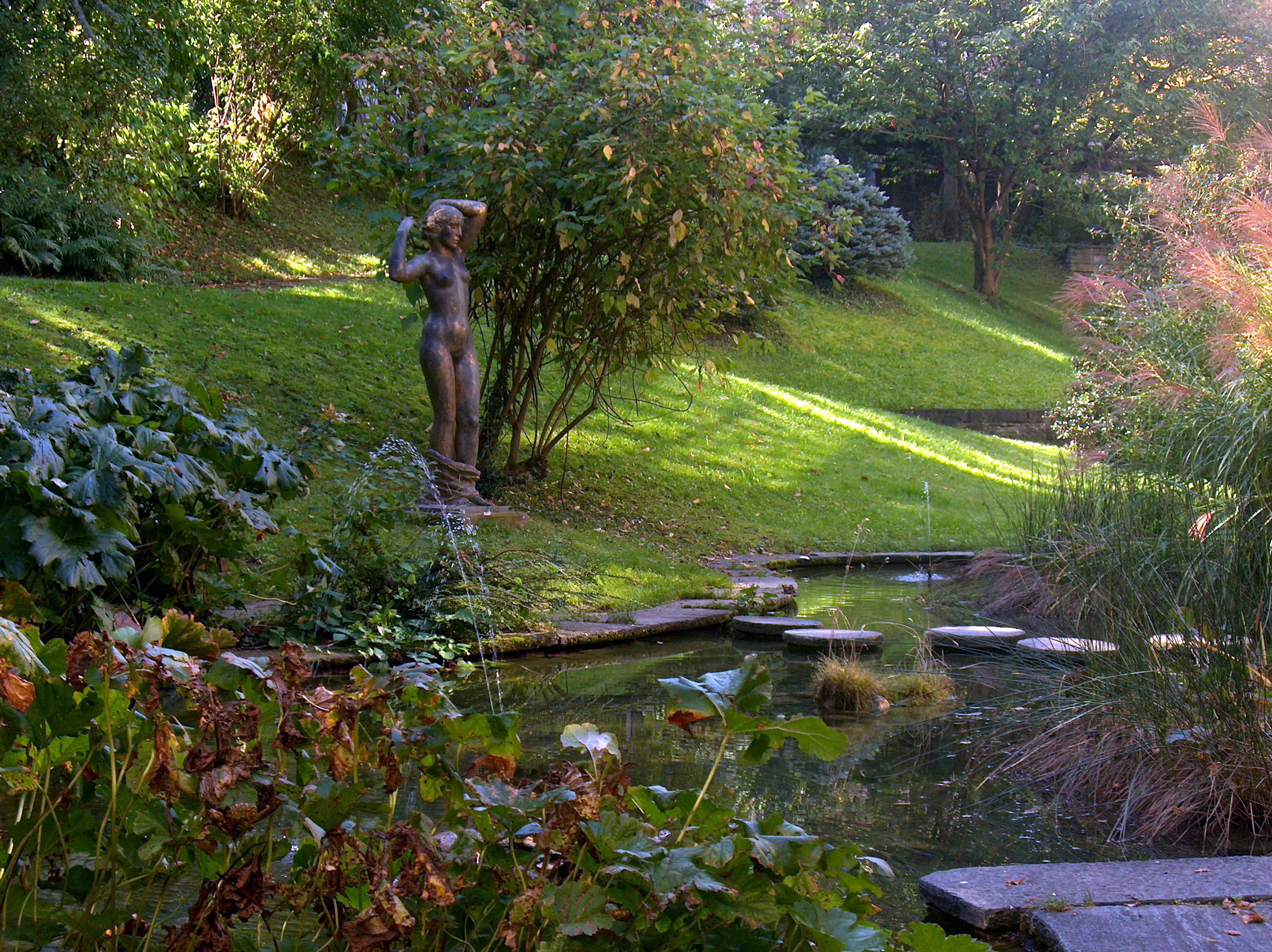
The pond viewed from the charity building.

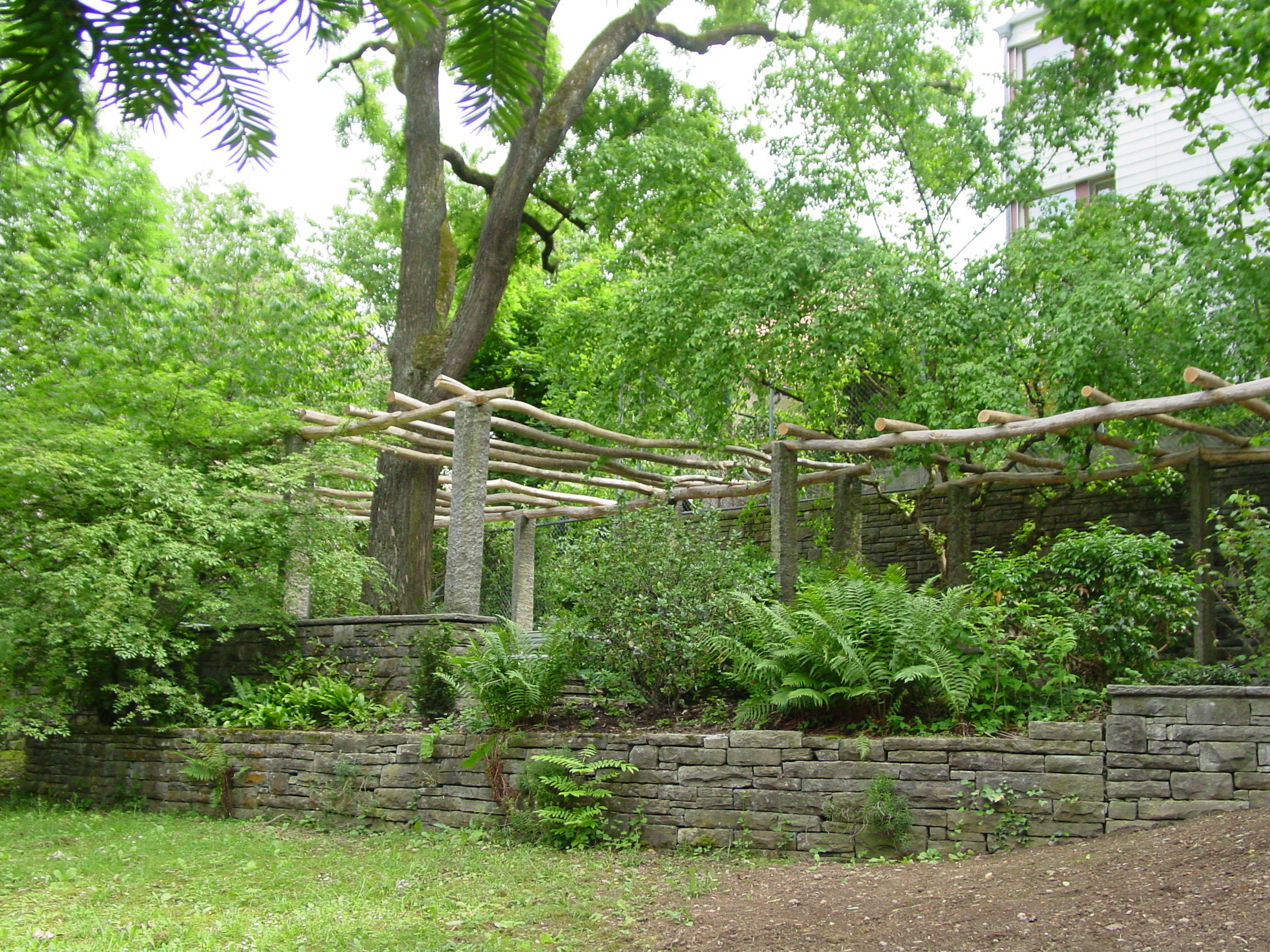
The pergola at the upper part of the park.

The Gustav-Ammann-Park is a public park in Oerlikon, Zurich on the former premises of Oerlikon-Bührle and covers 32,291 ft^{2} (3,000 m^{2}). In 1996, the privately owned park became a preserve. One year later, the formerly nameless facility was handed over to the population as Gustav-Ammann-Park. It was gently renovated in 2004/2005, maintaining all historical garden monuments. The park is named after its designer Gustav Ammann (1886–1955), a Swiss landscape architect who worked in the modernist style.

== Development ==
In 1942, a «welfare building» and accompanying park were built on the site of the armaments factory Werkzeugmaschinenfabrik Oerlikon, Bührle & Co. for their staff. With welfare in mind, a garden was created which focussed on the relaxation of the staff, not the appearance. The landscape architect Gustav Ammann created a peaceful refuge from the noise of the factory.

With the conversion of parts of the factory area, the former welfare garden was opened to the public and renamed as the Gustav-Ammann Park. As before, the park is privately owned and the right of use by the population and maintenance by the Office of Parks and Open Spaces of Zurich is regulated in a contract.

For the most part, the park retained its original form, however many areas were in a bad condition and had to be renovated. On behalf of the Office of Parks and Open Spaces, Ryffel & Ryffel Landscape Architects, Uster composed a written report in 1994 and from 2004 to 2005 they carefully restored the park with consideration of the garden as a monument.

The project planned to restore all surface areas and the sandstone dry walls. Many timbers in the large pergola were rotten and were replaced by polygonal ones as per the historical model. Some timbers had to be cleared for reasons of health or space, together with any shrubbery added in error. This gives the park a more open appearance. The new herbaceous borders around the building give accents of colour again today. The former solid factory door has been replaced by a lighter construction.

== Design ==
Today the Gustav-Amman Park, which is a protected monument, supplements the park landscape in Oerlikon, which is characterized by new innovative green areas in particular. As a welfare garden, the Gustav-Ammann-Park is unique in Switzerland. The design of the park includes many characteristic features of a residential garden and, together with the building, has been protected since 1996.

Small seating areas, covered promenade paths, natural stone walls, shrubs, intricate granite stone paths, and a small pond give an almost Mediterranean atmosphere.

In the former welfare buildings, some rooms are decorated with noteworthy wall paintings from the 1930s. Today they are under protection.
