= Congrès Internationaux d'Architecture Moderne =

Modern architecture movement organization

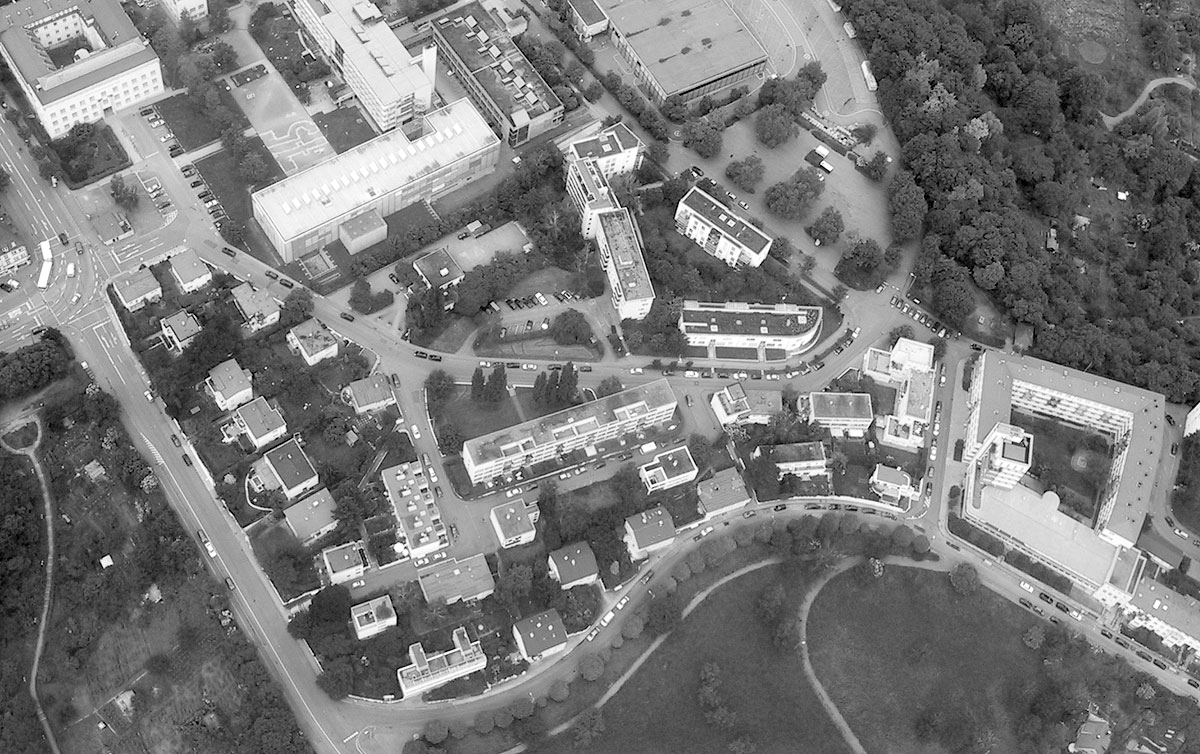
Weissenhof Estate in Stuttgart 1927. CIAM promoted modern architecture in the "Cubist style": the Bauhaus, Weissenhof, De Stijl, and modern projects of the Palace of Nations in Geneva. Parallel movements of the 1920s include Expressionism, Constructivism, Art Deco, and Traditionalism.

The Congrès Internationaux d'Architecture Moderne (CIAM), or International Congresses of Modern Architecture, was an organization founded in 1928 and disbanded in 1959, responsible for a series of events and congresses arranged across Europe by the most prominent architects of the time, with the objective of spreading the principles of the Modern Movement focusing on all the main domains of architecture (such as landscape, urbanism, industrial design, and many others).

== Formation and membership ==
The International Congresses of Modern Architecture (CIAM) was founded in June 1928, at the Chateau de la Sarraz in Switzerland, by a group of 28 European architects organized by Le Corbusier, Hélène de Mandrot (owner of the castle), and Sigfried Giedion, (the first secretary-general). CIAM was one of many 20th-century manifestos meant to advance the cause of architecture as a social art.

=== Members ===
Other founder members included Karl Moser (first president), Hendrik Berlage, Victor Bourgeois, Pierre Chareau, Sven Markelius, Josef Frank, Gabriel Guevrekian, Max Ernst Haefeli, Hugo Häring, Arnold Höchel, Huib Hoste, Pierre Jeanneret (cousin of Le Corbusier), André Lurçat, Ernst May, Max Cetto, Fernando García Mercadal, Hannes Meyer, Werner M. Moser, Carlo Enrico Rava, Gerrit Rietveld, Alberto Sartoris, Hans Schmidt, Mart Stam, Rudolf Steiger, Szymon Syrkus, Henri-Robert Von der Mühll, and Juan de Zavala. The Soviet delegates were El Lissitzky, Nikolai Kolli and Moisei Ginzburg, although at the Sarraz conference they were unable to obtain visas.

Later members included Minnette de Silva, Walter Gropius, Alvar Aalto, Uno Åhrén, Louis Herman De Koninck (1929) and Fred Forbát. In 1941, Harwell Hamilton Harris was chosen as secretary of the American branch of CIAM, which was the Chapter for Relief and Post War Planning, founded in New York City. Josep Lluís Sert participated in the congresses as of 1929, and served as CIAM president from 1947 to 1956. He was co-founder of GATEPAC and GATCPAC (in Zaragoza and Barcelona, respectively) in 1930, as well as ADLAN (Friends of New Art) in Barcelona in 1932.

=== CIRPAC ===
The elected executive body of CIAM was CIRPAC, the Comité international pour la résolution des problèmes de l’architecture contemporaine (International Committee for the Resolution of Problems in Contemporary Architecture).

== Influence ==
The organization was hugely influential. It was not only engaged in formalizing the architectural principles of the Modern Movement, but also saw architecture as an economic and political tool that could be used to improve the world through the design of buildings and through urban planning.

The fourth CIAM meeting in 1933 was to have been held in Moscow. The rejection of Le Corbusier's competition entry for the Palace of the Soviets, a watershed moment and an indication that the Soviets had abandoned CIAM's principles, changed those plans. Instead it was held on board ship, the SS Patris II. which sailed from Marseille to Athens. Here the group discussed the principles of "The Functional City", which broadened CIAM's scope from architecture into urban planning. Based on an analysis of thirty-three cities, CIAM proposed that the social problems faced by cities could be resolved by strict functional segregation, and the distribution of the population into tall apartment blocks at widely spaced intervals. These proceedings went unpublished from 1933 until 1943, when Le Corbusier, acting alone, published them in heavily edited form as the Athens Charter.

=== Separation ===
As CIAM members travelled worldwide after the war, many of its ideas spread outside Europe, notably to the USA. The city planning ideas were adopted in the rebuilding of Europe following World War II, although by then some CIAM members had their doubts. Alison and Peter Smithson were chief among the dissenters. When implemented in the postwar period, many of these ideas were compromised by tight financial constraints, poor understanding of the concepts, or popular resistance. Mart Stam's replanning of postwar Dresden in the CIAM formula was rejected by its citizens as an "all-out attack on the city".

The CIAM organization disbanded in 1959 as the views of the members diverged. Le Corbusier had left in 1955, objecting to the increasing use of English during meetings.

For a reform of CIAM, the group Team 10 was active from 1953 onwards, and two different movements emerged from it: the Brutalism of the English members (Alison and Peter Smithson) and the Structuralism of the Dutch members (Aldo van Eyck and Jacob B. Bakema).

== Conferences ==
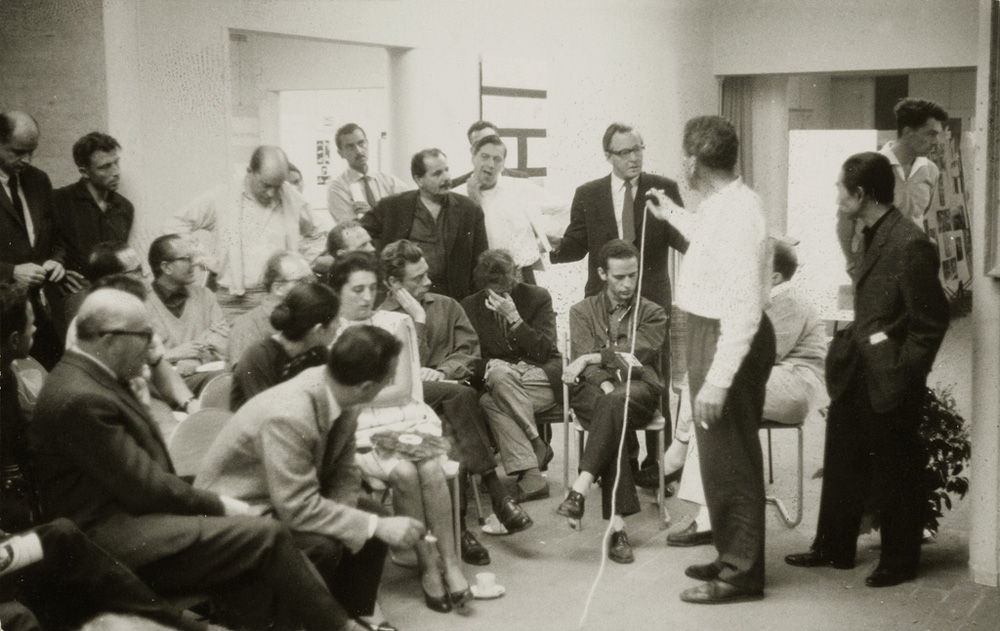
Otterlo Meeting 1959 (also CIAM '59), organized by Team 10, 43 participants. Meeting place: Kröller-Müller Museum, located in the Hoge Veluwe National Park. Dissolution of the organization CIAM.

CIAM's conferences consisted of:

- 1928, CIAM I, La Sarraz, Switzerland, Foundation of CIAM
- 1929, CIAM II, Frankfurt am Main, Germany, on The Minimum Dwelling
- 1930, CIAM III, Brussels, Belgium, on Rational Land Development (Rationelle Bebauungsweisen)
- 1933, CIAM IV, Athens, Greece, on The Functional City (Die funktionelle Stadt)
- 1937, CIAM V, Paris, France, on Dwelling and Recovery
- 1947, CIAM VI, Bridgwater, England, Reaffirmation of the aims of CIAM
- 1949, CIAM VII, Bergamo, Italy, on The Athens Charter in Practice
- 1951, CIAM VIII, Hoddesdon, England, on The Heart of the City
- 1953, CIAM IX, Aix-en-Provence, France, on Habitat
- 1956, CIAM X, Dubrovnik, Yugoslavia (now Croatia), on Habitat
- 1959, CIAM XI, Otterlo, the Netherlands, organized dissolution of CIAM by Team 10

== See also ==
- Modern architecture
- Modernist architecture topics

== Bibliography ==
- Eric Mumford, The CIAM Discourse on Urbanism – 1928–1960, Cambridge Mass. and London 2000. (Foreword by Kenneth Frampton).
- Sigfried Giedion, Space, Time and Architecture – The Growth of a New Tradition, Cambridge Mass. 2009, 5th edition. (CIAM, summary in Part VI).
- Max Risselada and Dirk van den Heuvel (eds.), TEAM 10 – In Search of a Utopia of the Present – 1953–1981, Rotterdam 2005. (TEAM 10 out of CIAM).
- Lorenzo Mingardi, Reweaving the city: the CIAM summer schools from London to Venice (1949–57), L. Ciccarelli, C. Melhuish (eds), Post-war Architecture between Italy and the UK.Exchanges and transcultural influences, London, UCL Press, 2021, 107-126. ISBN 9781800080836
