= Haefeli Moser Steiger =

Swiss architectural firm

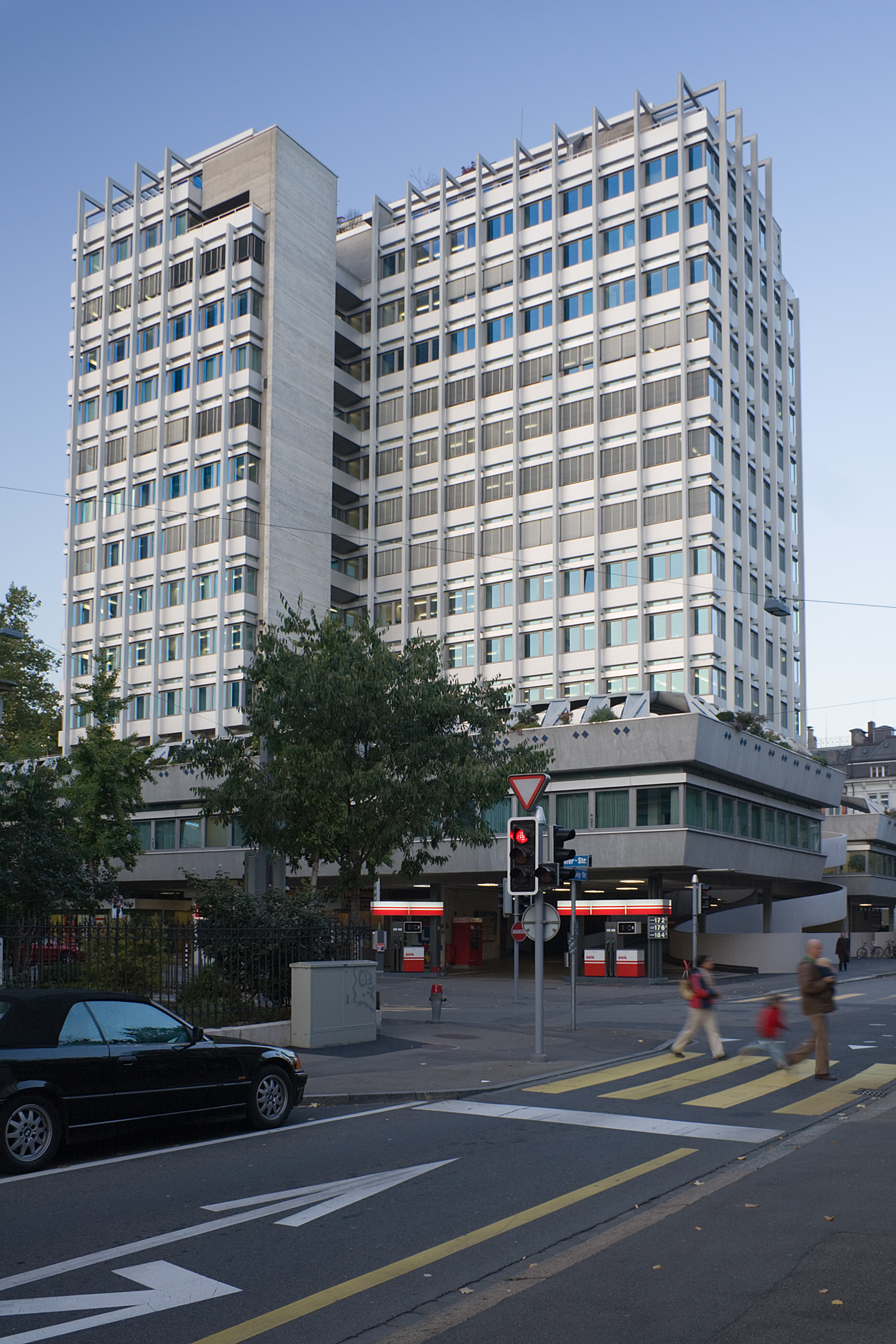
Hochhaus zur Palme, Zürich, 2005

Haefeli Moser Steiger (HMS) was a Swiss architectural firm, founded by the architects Max Ernst Haefeli, Werner Max Moser and Rudolf Steiger, the office existed from 1937 to 1975 and was one of the most important Swiss architectural firms of the 20th century. In 2007, the Museum für Gestaltung dedicated an exhibition to the office under the title Chair House City – Haefeli Moser Steiger.

== Buildings ==
- Werkbundsiedlung Neubühl, Zurich, 1930–1932
- Kongresshaus Zürich, Zurich, 1936–1939
- University Hospital of Zurich, Zurich, 1941–1953
- Wohnkolonie Farbhof, Zurich, ca. 1950
- Verwaltungsgebäude der Eternit AG, Niederurnen, 1953–55
- Hochhaus zur Palme, Zurich, 1955–1964
- Zur Palme, Zurich, 1961

== Literature ==
- Sonja Hildebrand, Bruno Maurer, Werner Oechslin (Hrsg.): Haefeli Moser Steiger. Die Architekten der Schweizer Moderne, ISBN 978-3-85676-205-6
