= Eric P. Mumford =

American writer

- Occupation: distinguished professor

Academic work
- Discipline: architecture
- Institutions: Washington University in St. Louis.

Eric P. Mumford is a distinguished professor of architecture at Washington University in St. Louis. He is the author of a number of books on architecture.

== Publications ==
=== Books ===
- The CIAM Discourse on Urbanism, 1928-1960.
- Modern Architecture: A Critical History.
- Designing the Modern City: Urbanism since 1850. New Haven, CT: Yale University Press. 2018.
