= Flora Steiger-Crawford =

Swiss architect and sculptor (1899–1991)

Flora Steiger-Crawford (1 September 1899, Bombay – 31 July 1991, Zurich) was a Swiss architect and sculptor. In 1923, she became the first woman to graduate in architecture from the Federal Institute of Technology in Zurich where she studied under Karl Coelestin Moser. After working with Pfleghard & Haefeli in Zurich, she married Rudolf Steiger in 1924 and established her own firm with him in Riehen, moving to Zurich the following year. Their first project, the Sandreuter House in Riehen (1924), is considered to be the first Modernist house in Switzerland. Steiger-Crawford went on to design individual houses while developing modern furniture, including a stackable metal chair for the Zett House in Zurich (1932). In 1930, she turned to sculpture, terminating her architectural activities in 1938. From 1938, she was a member of the Swiss Association of Female Artists and Sculptors.

== See also ==
- Women in architecture

== Literature ==
- Evelyne Lang Jakob, Flora Steiger-Crawford, Architektenlexikon, pp 510–511.
- Flora Steiger-Crawford, Marianne Burkhalter, Jutta Glanzmann, Evelyne Lang-Jakob: Flora Steiger-Crawford 1899-1991. gta, Zurich 2003, ISBN 978-3-85676-112-7.
