= Rudolf Steiger =

Swiss architect (1900–1982)

- Born: 4 October 1900; Zurich, Switzerland
- Died: 24 June 1982 (aged 81); Zurich, Switzerland
- Education: ETH Zurich
- Occupation: Architect
- Spouse: Flora Crawford (m. 1924)
- Practice: Haefeli Moser Steiger (1937–1970)
- Buildings: Haus Sandreuter, Riehen (1924); Neubühl, Zurich (1928–1932); Zett-Haus, Zurich (1929–1931)

Rudolf Steiger (4 October 1900 – 24 June 1982) was a Swiss architect and an important representative of Neues Bauen in Switzerland. His buildings include the Haus Sandreuter in Riehen as well as the Neubühl housing estate and the Zett-Haus in Zurich. From 1937 to 1970 he was a member of the joint office Haefeli Moser Steiger, which built the Kongresshaus and the cantonal hospital in Zurich, and from 1944 he did pioneering work in spatial planning.

== Biography ==
Rudolf Steiger was born on 4 October 1900 in Zurich, the son of Carl Steiger, a painter and aviation pioneer, and Marie Kirchhofer. In 1924 he married Flora Crawford. He studied architecture at ETH Zurich, graduating in 1923 under Karl Moser, and worked in Brussels and Berlin.

In 1924 Steiger founded his own office with his wife in Riehen, and in 1925 he moved to Zurich. He was an important representative of Neues Bauen in Switzerland. His most important buildings include the Haus Sandreuter in Riehen (1924, with his wife), the Neubühl Werkbund estate (Werkbundsiedlung Neubühl, 1928–1932, as part of a working group) and the Zett-Haus (1929–1931, with his wife and Carl Hubacher), both in Zurich.

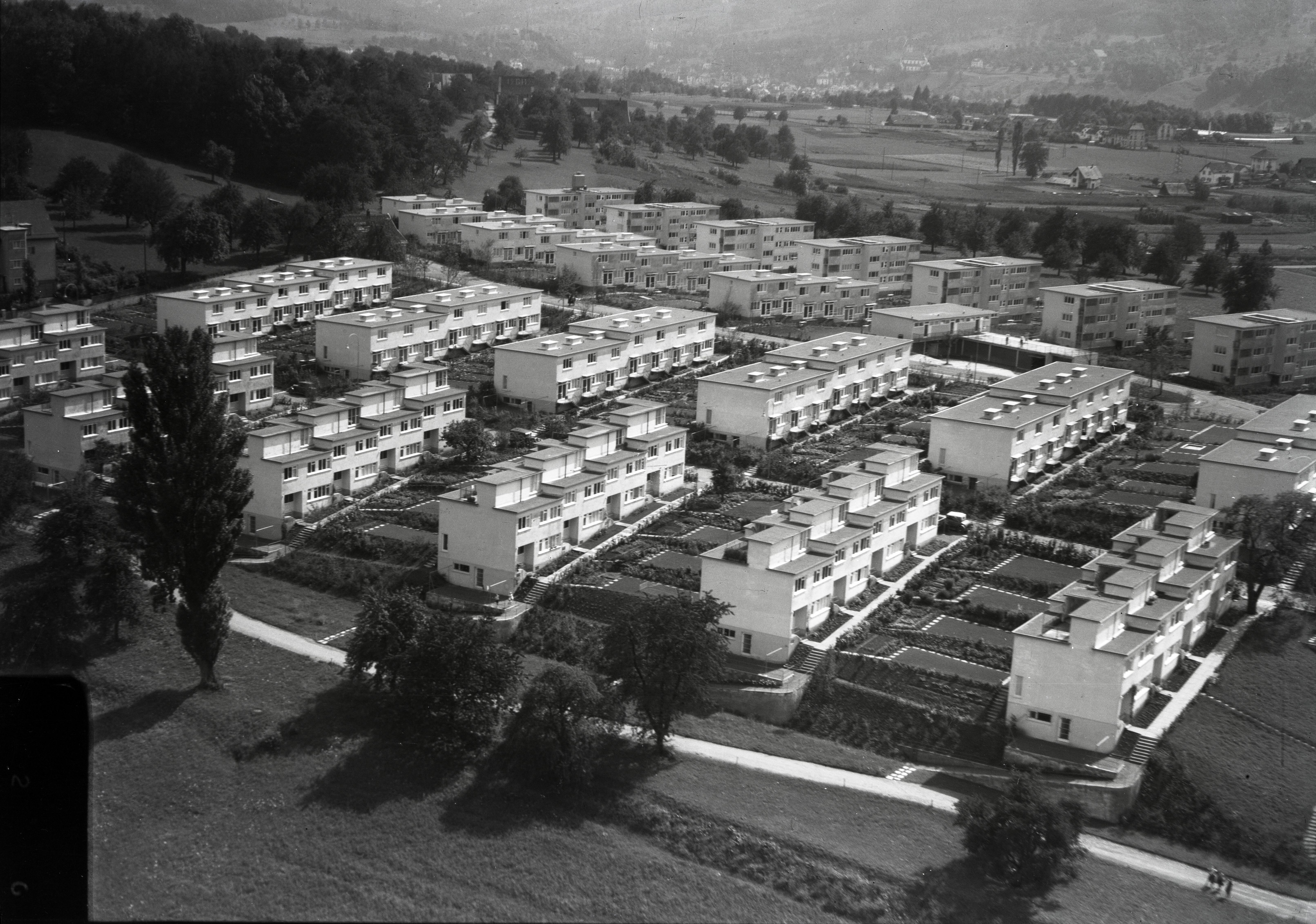
The Neubühl Werkbund estate in Zurich in 1932

From 1937 to 1970 Steiger was a member of the joint office Haefeli Moser Steiger, which built the Kongresshaus (1936–1939) and the cantonal hospital of Zurich (Kantonsspital Zürich, 1938–1953). From 1944 he did pioneering work in spatial planning. He was a delegate of Switzerland to the Congrès Internationaux d'Architecture Moderne (CIAM).

Steiger was a member of the Federation of Swiss Architects (Bund Schweizer Architekten, BSA), the Swiss Society of Engineers and Architects (SIA) and the Swiss Werkbund (SWB). He was a co-founder of the Swiss association for national planning (Schweizerische Vereinigung für Landesplanung) and chairman (Obmann) of the Federation of Swiss Planners (Bund Schweizer Planer). In 1952 he received an honorary doctorate from the University of Zurich. He died on 24 June 1982 in Zurich.

== Bibliography ==
- Architektenlexikon der Schweiz, 19./20. Jahrhundert, 512 f.
- S. Hildebrand et al. (eds.), Haefeli, Moser, Steiger, 2007

=== Archives ===
- gta Archives, ETH Zurich
