= Tonhalle, Zurich =

Tonhalle
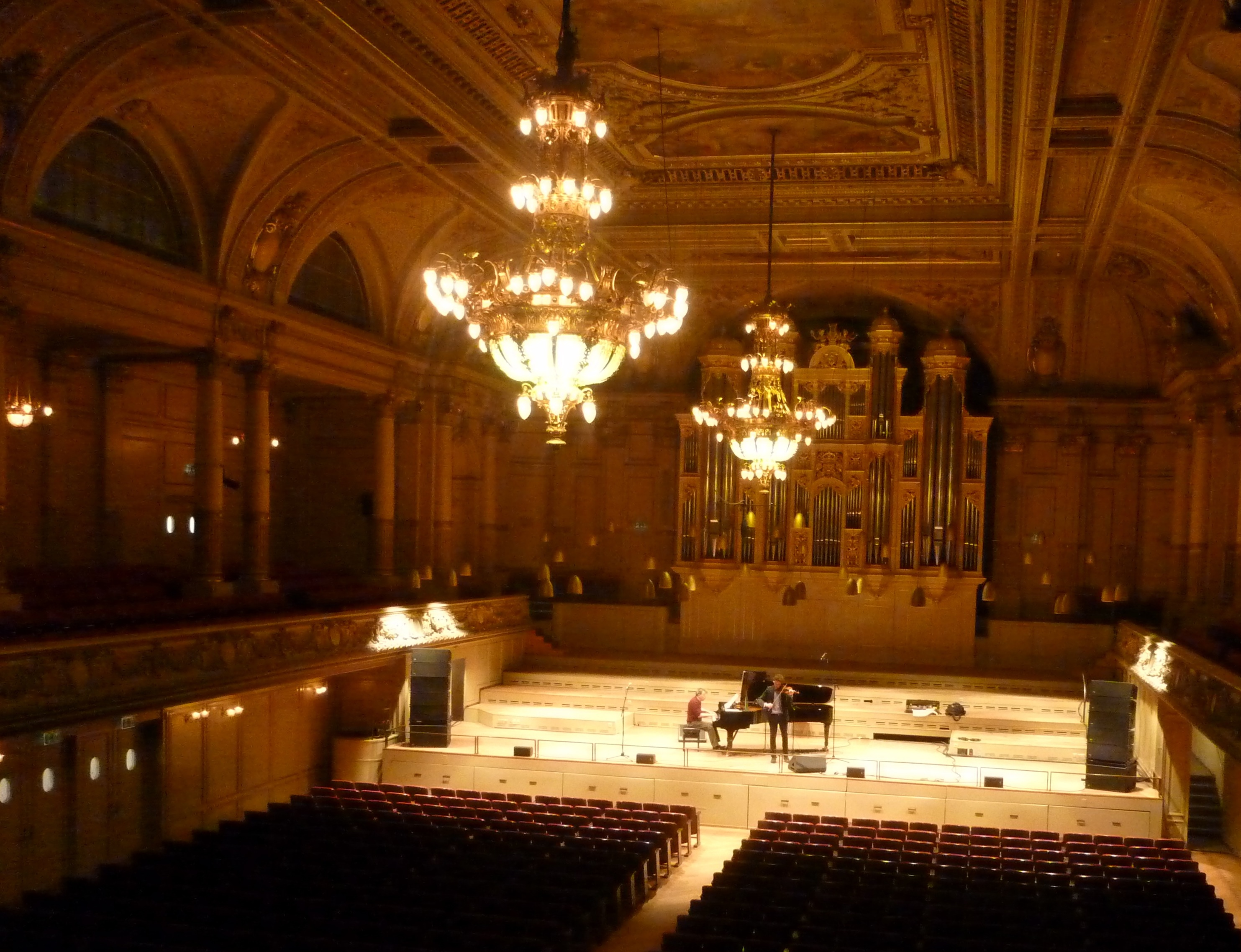
- Great Hall of the Tonhalle
- Interactive map of the Tonhalle area

General information
- Location: Zurich, Switzerland
- Coordinates: 47°21′58″N 8°32′16″E
- Construction started: 1893
- Completed: 1895
- Renovated: 2017-2021

Design and construction
- Architects: Ferdinand Fellner; Hermann Helmer

Renovating team
- Architects: ARGE Boesch Diener; Elisabeth & Martin Boesch Architekten, Zürich; Diener & Diener Architekten, Basel

Website
- www.kongresshaus.ch

The Tonhalle is a concert hall in Zurich, home to the Tonhalle-Orchester Zürich, one of Switzerland's leading orchestras. The Tonhalle complex comprises two halls: the Grosser Saal (Great Hall), with 1,430 seats (816 in the stalls, 614 in the gallery and balcony), and the Kleine Tonhalle (Small Hall), with 609 seats. The Grosser Saal, located at Claridenstrasse 7, was inaugurated on 19 October 1895 by Johannes Brahms, who conducted the opening concert. The hall is considered to be "acoustically superb". In 1938, it made way for a new construction that now forms the building complex Kongresshaus Zürich.

== Prehistory ==
Public concert life in Zurich developed from the city's bourgeois music societies, which in 1812 united as the Allgemeine Musik-Gesellschaft Zürich (AMG), an amateur orchestra of around fifty musicians supplemented by professionals. For half a century the AMG was the principal institution for public concerts in the city, lending its orchestra to the Aktientheater im Casino, founded in 1834. Both venues operated from buildings of the former Barefoot Friars' monastery between Hirschengraben and Neumarkt.

From 1850 Richard Wagner worked in Zurich and drew large audiences, but the cramped concert facilities led him to withdraw from the city's concert life in 1855. His departure intensified longstanding calls for a permanent professional orchestra and a purpose-built concert hall.

In 1867 the Kornhaus am See, a former granary on what is now Sechseläutenplatz, was converted into a festival hall accommodating up to 3,600 people for the festival of the Swiss Music Society. A 1,400-seat concert hall and a restaurant with a palm garden were subsequently installed there. Despite acoustic deficiencies, the hall — known as the "old Tonhalle" — served Zurich's concert life for nearly thirty years. In 1868 the Tonhalle-Gesellschaft was founded, taking over the orchestral society established in 1862 (around thirty mostly amateur instrumentalists), which became the Tonhalle-Orchester.

The choirs of Zurich were a driving force in this development, particularly the men's choir Sängerverein Harmonie (founded 1841) and the Gemischter Chor Zürich (founded 1863), the latter directed by Friedrich Hegar. Hegar joined the Tonhalle-Orchester as first violinist, became its conductor, and shaped Zurich's musical life for nearly four decades as conductor, composer and director of the conservatory. An organ built in 1872 by the firm Orgelbau Kuhn in Männedorf was installed in the old Tonhalle, financed by patrons and choir benefit concerts; it was first heard at two performances of Bach's St Matthew Passion, each before audiences of 2,300, with the participation of the city's choirs.

The old Tonhalle hosted significant concert premieres in this period: Johannes Brahms's German Requiem in 1868, Handel's Samson and Mendelssohn's Paulus in 1869, and Beethoven's Missa solemnis in 1870. In 1881 Brahms himself conducted several of his own works in the hall, including the world premiere of his Nänie. The following year, the 19th convention of the Allgemeiner Deutscher Musikverein met in the hall, with concerts featuring works by Franz Liszt among others. By the late 1880s, however, the hall's acoustic limitations and the ambitions of Zurich's expanding musical life had made a purpose-built concert hall a pressing necessity.

== History ==
=== Tonhalle 'Trocadéro' (1895) ===
The Tonhalle was built between 1893 and 1895, and designed by the Viennese architects Ferdinand Fellner and Hermann Helmer, who had built the Zurich Opera House and various other theaters and concert halls across Europe. The architects had become especially experienced in acoustics, and also achieved excellent acoustics in the Tonhalle. In his comparison of concert halls and opera houses, Leo Leroy Beranek found the Grosser Saal (Great Hall) "an excellent hall", agreeing with three out of four conductors whom he had interviewed, adding "Music critics have generally given high praise to the acoustics". Johannes Brahms conducted his Triumphlied, Op. 55 for the opening on 19 October 1895. At the time, the Tonhalle is also known as the Trocadéro in Zurich due to its resemblance to the Trocadéro Palace in Paris.

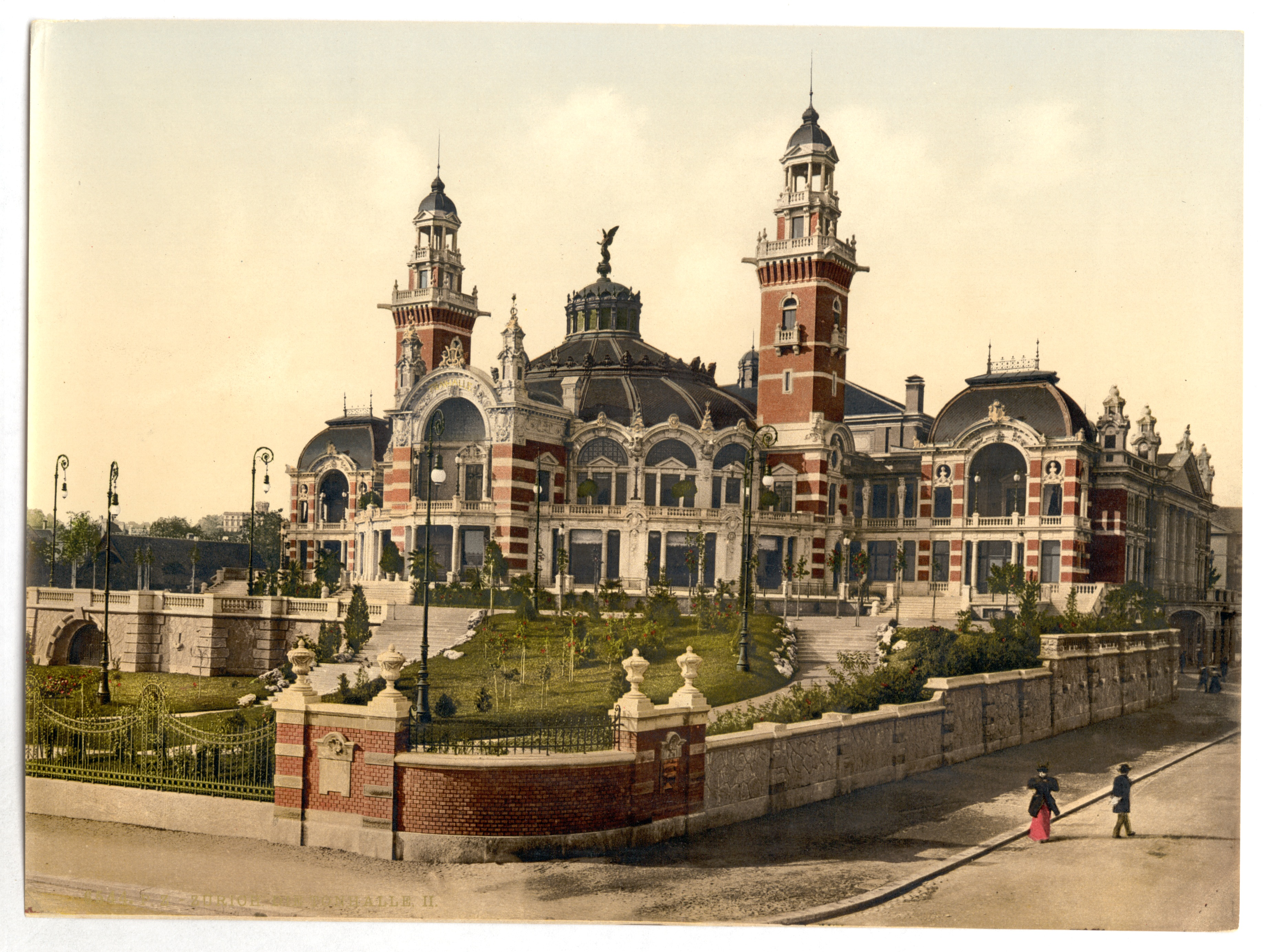
Original building (1895)

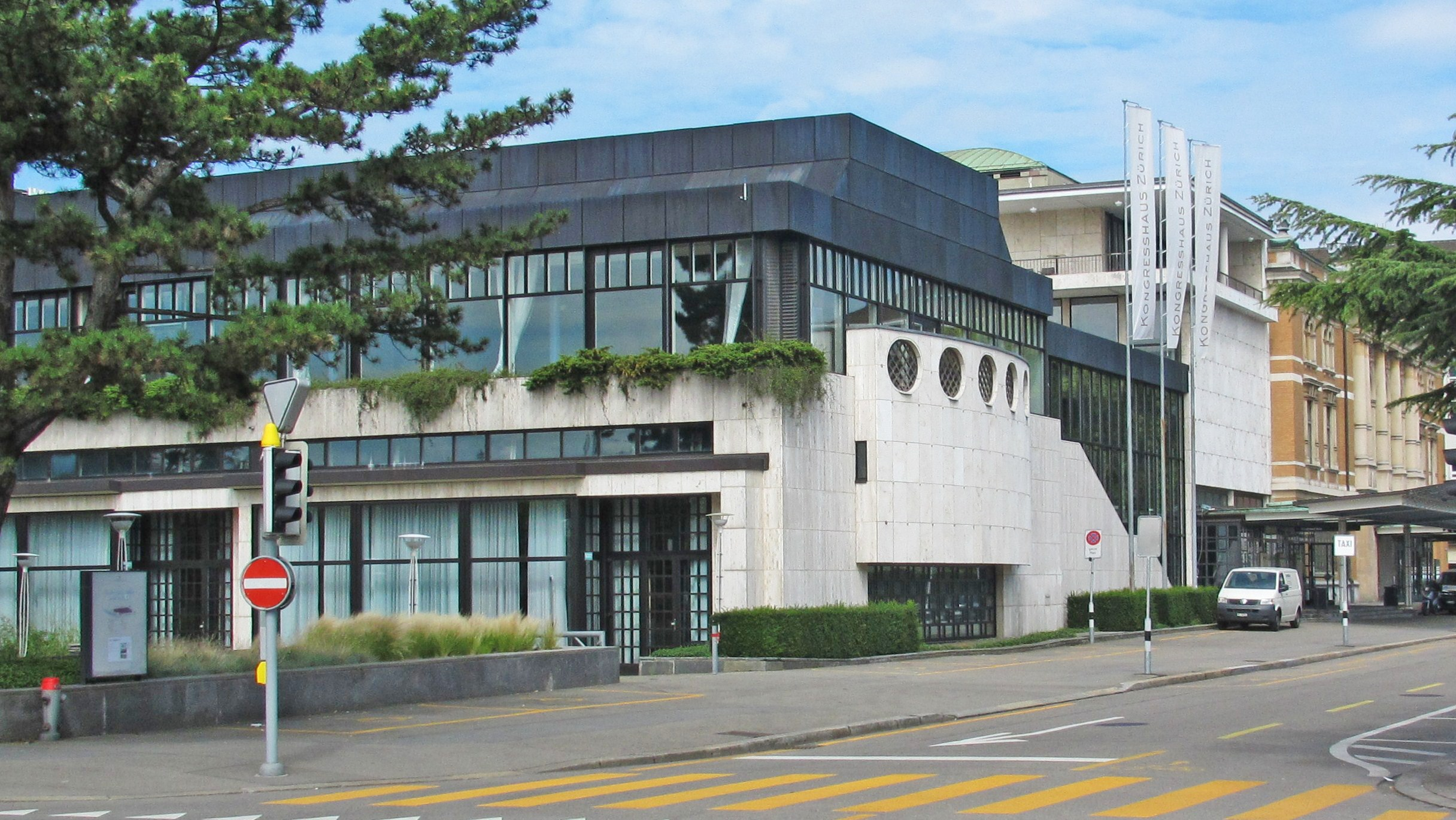
Current structure (1939)

=== Current structure (1939) ===
In 1938, to make room for a convention center in the course of the Swiss National Exhibition, the building was almost entirely demolished, leaving only the inner hall and the north-east façade. The replacing structure was designed by the architectural the architectural firm Haefeli Moser Steiger and serves as one of the main examples of the Swiss variant of New Objectivity, called Landistil.

== Musical leadership ==
The Tonhalle-Orchester Zürich has been led by a series of long-tenured chief conductors who shaped the orchestra's artistic profile across the twentieth and twenty-first centuries. Friedrich Hegar (1841–1927), the orchestra's first significant conductor, led the ensemble for nearly four decades from its early years and concurrently directed the Gemischter Chor Zürich and the Zurich Conservatory, establishing the institution's central role in the city's musical life. His tenure also saw the integration of the orchestra into the new 1895 Tonhalle and the establishment of its subscription concert series.

In 1906 Volkmar Andreae (1879–1962) succeeded Hegar and led the Tonhalle-Orchester for forty years, until 1949. Building on Hegar's foundation, Andreae developed the orchestra into an ensemble of international standing, expanding its repertoire to include contemporary works by Swiss composers such as Hermann Suter (whose oratorio Le Laudi di San Francesco was premiered in 1925–1926) and Arthur Honegger (whose Le Roi David entered the repertoire in this period). Andreae also introduced youth and popular concert series alongside the established subscription programmes; in the 1928–1929 season the Tonhalle's halls hosted approximately 130 external rentals in addition to the orchestra's own programming.

Andreae's symbolic concert of 8 May 1945 — at which he conducted Beethoven's Ninth Symphony on the day of the Allied victory in Europe, so that the "Ode to Joy" coincided with the end of the Second World War — has been described in subsequent accounts as a wonderful coincidence of programming and history. Andreae was succeeded by Erich Schmid, who continued the orchestra's commitment to contemporary music.

A long-standing structural complication was that the Tonhalle-Orchester also served the Opernhaus Zürich, dividing its musicians between concert and opera duties despite the use of dozens of supplementary players. In 1984–1985 the two functions were separated, with the opera ensemble continuing as a distinct formation (renamed Philharmonia Zürich in 2012); the separation has since been credited with improving the artistic homogeneity of both ensembles. In 1950, Josef Müller-Brockmann produced his first of many concert posters for the Tonhalle concert hall in Zurich, which became known as the Tonhalle Series or "Musica Viva". The Tonhalle Series grew increasingly abstract and focused on the feelings of the music. Müller-Brockman used a visual form to translate the mathematical system that is found in music, playing with visual scale, rhythm, and repetition, while trying to stay true to each musicians composition who was featured on the poster.

In 1988, to replace the original organ built in 1872 by the Swiss manufacturer Johann Nepomuk Kuhn, the Tonhalle was equipped with a pipe organ built by the German firm Kleuker-Steinmeyer. The organist and organ consultant Jean Guillou was instrumental in its design.

=== Plans of new construction and renovation (2000s) ===
Plans to replace the Kongresshaus with a new convention center were submitted in 2006 but rejected in 2008. Renovations were planned for the 2013/14 season.

Major renovation works on the hall began in 2017, which included the removal of the old organ and installation of a new one built by the firm Kuhn. The old organ was donated to the Koper Cathedral in Slovenia.
