= University Hospital of Zurich =

University Hospital of Zürich

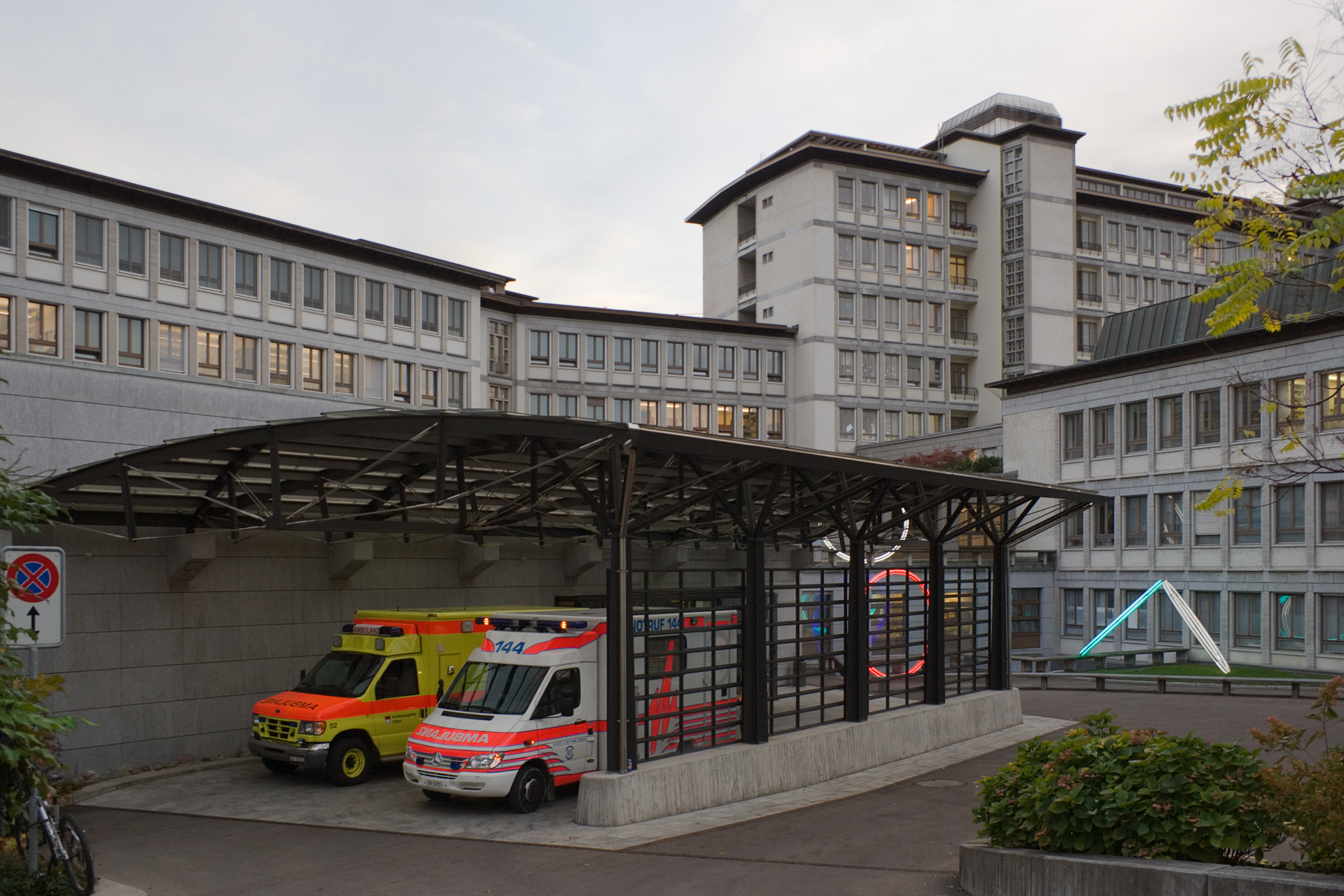
- The entrance of the emergency department of the University Hospital of Zürich

Geography
- Location: Zürich, Switzerland
- Coordinates: 47°22′36″N 8°32′59″E

Organisation
- Type: Teaching
- Affiliated university: University of Zürich

Services
- Emergency department: Yes
- Beds: ~900

Helipads
- Helipad: Yes

History
- Founded: 1204; 822 years ago

Links
- Website: https://www.usz.ch/en/
- Lists: Hospitals in Switzerland

The University Hospital of Zürich (German: Universitätsspital Zürich, USZ) is one of five university hospitals in Switzerland.

The first hospital in Zürich, from which the current hospital derives, is recorded as having existed as early as 1204. As of December 2025, the hospital employs an approximate staff of 10,800 (1,200 doctors, 4,000 care professionals, 1,250 medical-technical and medical-therapeutic specialists) providing medical care to 882,000 ambulant visitors and over 42,000 stationary patients each year.

Scientists and physicians of international renown who have practiced at the hospital include Ferdinand Sauerbruch, Andreas Grüntzig and Rolf M. Zinkernagel; the latter received a Nobel Prize for research done at the hospital.

== History ==
The earliest record of the Hospital of Zürich dates back to a document from 1204, in which Berthold IV dedicates the institution to his son. In 1803 the hospital became a cantonal hospital ("Kantonsspital") through a governmental council decision. In 1833 the University of Zurich was founded and the cantonal hospital was transformed into a university and teaching institution.

In 1996, the University Hospital of Zurich’s dermatology department developed an approach using dendritic cells to vaccinate patients with advanced melanoma.

In 2020, the hospital co-led a large-scale international study with Harvard Medical School on the use of the antimalarial drugs hydroxychloroquine and chloroquine for COVID-19 treatment. The research, published in The Lancet, found no clinical benefit and reported a higher mortality rate among patients who received the drugs. However, the study was retracted shortly afterward due to concerns about the reliability of the underlying data, which had been provided by an external company. The hospital later clarified that it had not participated in the data collection or analysis and had joined the project only during the evaluation phase.

== See also ==
- University of Zürich
