= Giedion =

Giedion is a surname. Notable people with the surname include:

- Carola Giedion-Welcker (née Welcker; 1893–1979), German-Swiss art historian
- Sigfried Giedion (1888–1968), Bohemian-born Swiss historian and critic of architecture

== See also ==
- Langer–Giedion syndrome
- Schinzel–Giedion syndrome
