= Aldo van Eyck =

Dutch architect

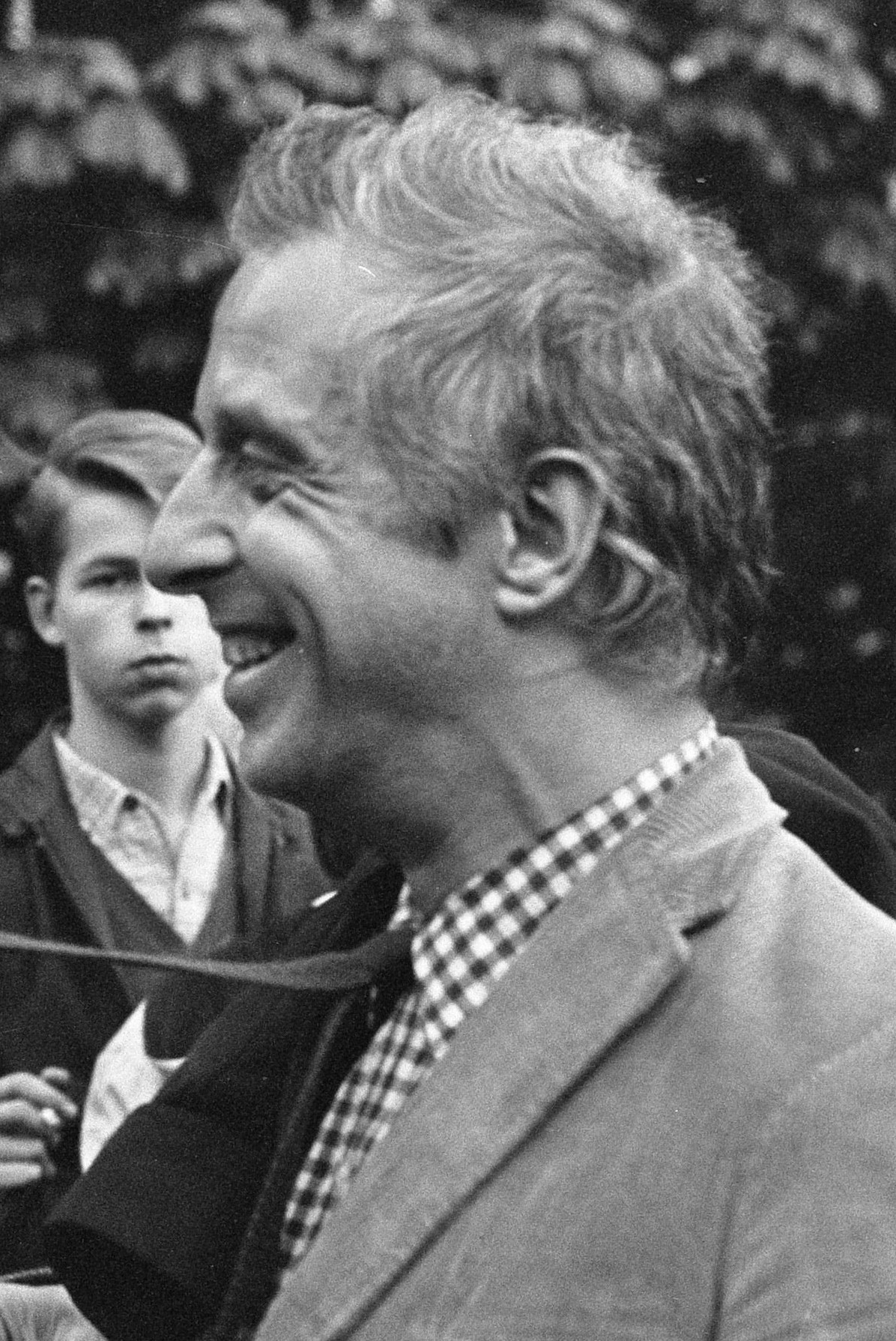
- Aldo van Eyck in Vondelpark, Amsterdam in 1967
- Born: 16 March 1918; Driebergen, Netherlands
- Died: 14 January 1999 (aged 80); Loenen aan de Vecht, Netherlands
- Education: ETH Zurich
- Occupation: Architect

Aldo van Eyck (Dutch pronunciation: [ˈɑldoː vɑn ˈɛik]; 16 March 1918 – 14 January 1999) was a Dutch architect. He was one of the most influential protagonists of the architectural movement Structuralism.

== Family ==
He was born in Driebergen, Utrecht, a son of poet, critic, essayist and philosopher Pieter Nicolaas van Eyck or van Eijk and wife Nelly Estelle Benjamins, a woman of Sephardic origin born and raised in Suriname.

His brother was poet, artist and art restorer Robert Floris van Eyck or van Eijk. He was married to Hannie van Rooijen, also an architect. She assisted him in several projects.

== Early life and career ==
His family moved to the United Kingdom in 1919 and he was educated at Sidcot School, Somerset, from 1932 to 1935, after which he finished his secondary school in The Hague between 1935 and 1938, and went to study at the ETH Zurich. He graduated in 1942, after which he remained in Switzerland until the end of World War II, where he entered the circle of many other avant-garde artists around Carola Giedion-Welcker, wife of historian Sigfried Giedion.

He taught at the Amsterdam Academy of Architecture from 1954 to 1959 and he was a professor at the Delft University of Technology from 1966 to 1984. He also was editor of the architecture magazine Forum from 1959 to 1963 and in 1967.

== Later career ==
A member of CIAM and then in 1954 a co-founder of "Team 10", Van Eyck lectured throughout Europe and northern America propounding the need to reject Functionalism and attacking the lack of originality in most post-war Modernism. Van Eyck was as co-editor of the Dutch magazine Forum between 1959 and 1963, alongside Herman Hertzberger and Jaap Bakema. This helped publicise the "Team 10" call for a return to humanism within architectural design.

Van Eyck received the RIBA Royal Gold Medal in 1990.

He died at Loenen aan de Vecht, aged 80.

== Structures ==
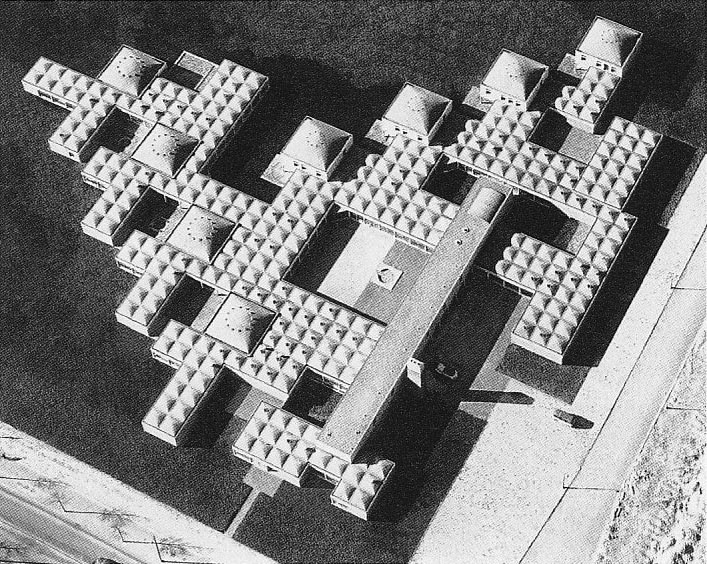
Municipal Orphanage in Amsterdam, 1960 (Aldo van Eyck)

- Design for village of Nagele, Noordoostpolder, 1948–1954
- Housing for the Elderly, Slotermeer, Amsterdam, 1951–1952
- Amsterdam Orphanage, Amsterdam, 1955–1960
- Primary Schools, Nagele, Noordoostpolder, 1954–1956
- Hubertus House, Amsterdam, 1973–1978
- ESA-ESTEC restaurant and conference centre, Noordwijk, 1984–1990

== Sources ==
- Francis Strauven, Aldo van Eyck; The Shape of Relativity, Amsterdam: Architectura & Natura, 1998, 680 p.
- Raphaël Labrunye, L'orphelinat d'Aldo van Eyck ; De la réception de l'œuvre à la genèse du projet, Paris: Métis Presse, 2016, 256 p.
- Francis Strauven, Pastoor van Ars Church, The Hague; A Timeless Sacral Space by Aldo van Eyck, Köln: Verlag der Buchhandlung Walther und Franz König/Brussels: Architecture Curating Practice, 2023, 224 p.
