= Paffard Keatinge-Clay =

Architect (1926–2023)

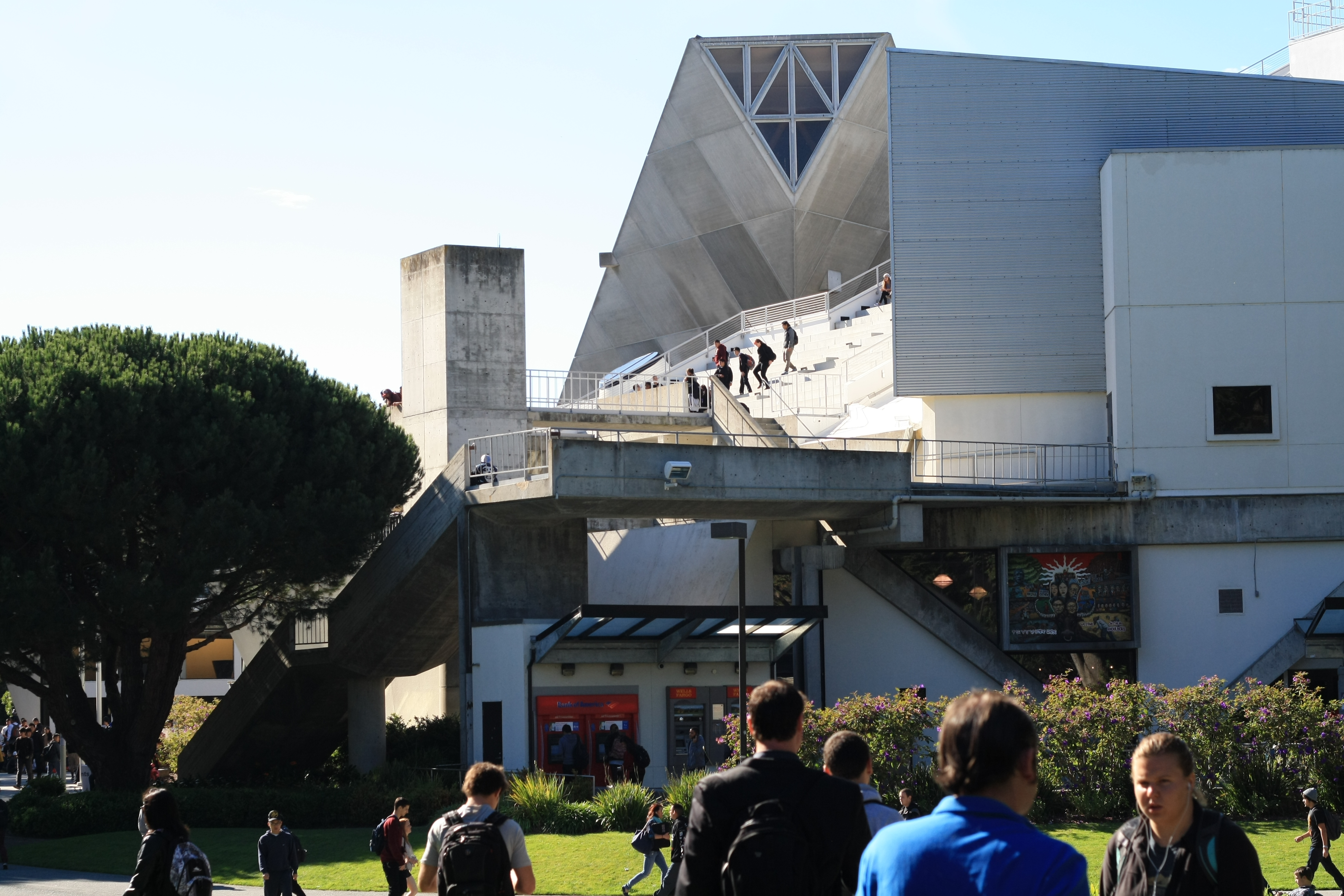
Cesar Chavez Student Center at San Francisco State University (1975)

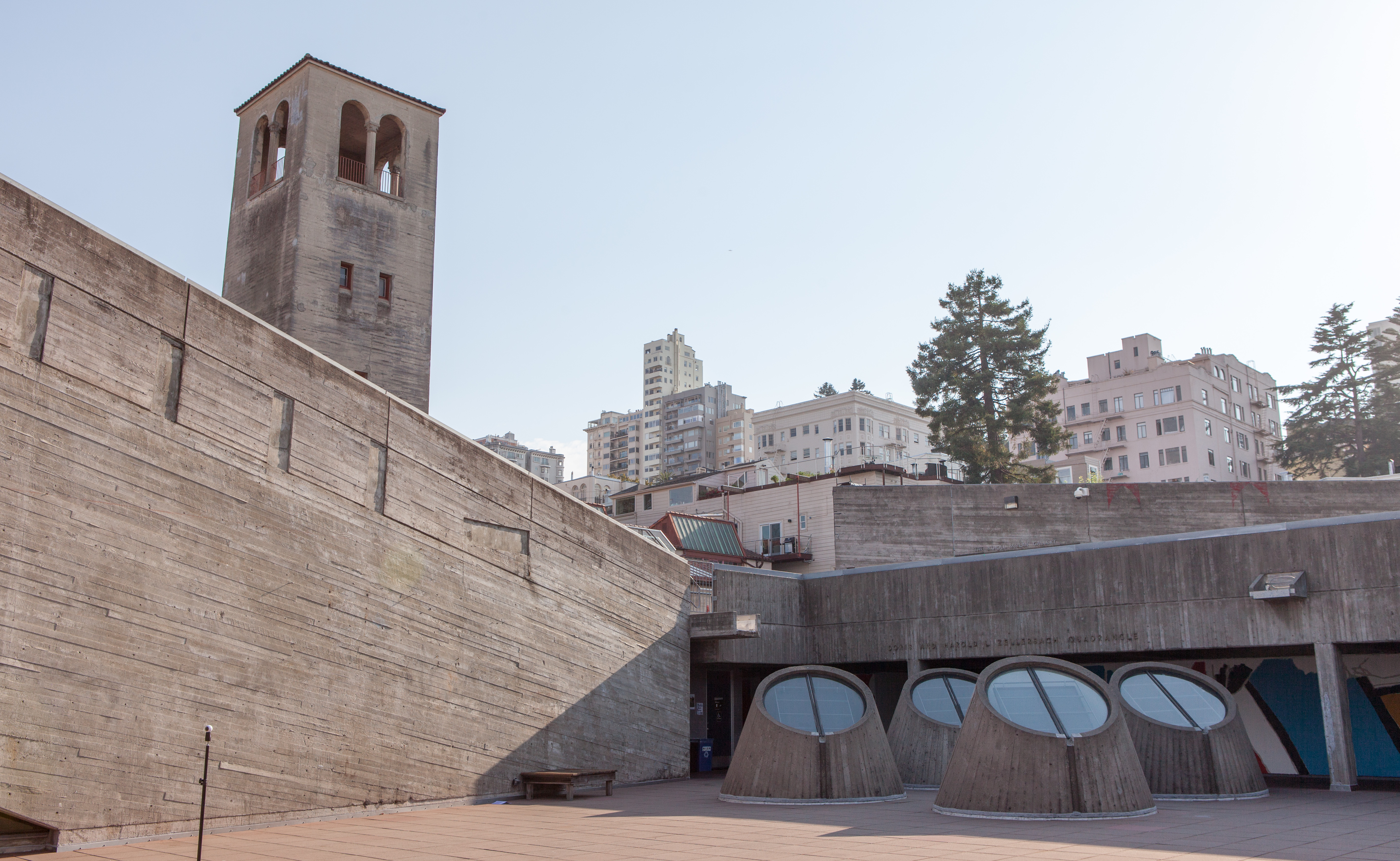
San Francisco Art Institute (1969)

Paffard Keatinge-Clay (5 February 1926 – 17 March 2023) was a British-born architect in the modernist tradition who spent most of his professional life in the United States, before moving to southern Spain, where he increasingly focused on sculpture.

Practicing architecture in San Francisco from 1960 until 1975, Paffard Keatinge-Clay left behind a legacy of architectural work in the Bay Area, some of which is realised, but for a large body only paper documentation exists. These buildings and projects are indices of a career marked in equal measure by synthesis and ambition and which is characterised by a series of apprenticeships with major architectural figures that were active between late 1940 and early 1960: Le Corbusier, Frank Lloyd Wright, and Skidmore, Owings & Merrill. He also shared an association with a host of other notable designers including: Myron Goldsmith, Mies van der Rohe, Siegfried Giedion, Richard Neutra, Charles and Ray Eames, Ernő Goldfinger, and Raphael Soriano. He lived for many years near Mijas, in Spain, where he maintained an architect's office and developed interests in "very pure large-scale sculpture".

== Early life ==
Paffard Keatinge-Clay was born on 5 February 1926. He grew up in the Wiltshire village of Teffont Evias, near Salisbury, in the south of England, where his father was rector, in a 16th-century house without electricity or indoor plumbing.

Keatinge-Clay received his education at Wellington College and at the Architectural Association in London, dual majoring in Architecture and Structural Engineering. He graduated in 1949. He began his professional career while in school at the London office of architect Ernő Goldfinger.

== Architectural career ==
Keatinge-Clay worked for approximately one year in the studio of famed French architect Le Corbusier at 7 Rue de Sèvres in Paris, France in 1948. While there, his work focused primarily on the Unite d’Habitacion in Marseilles and on the plan for the town of Saint Die. Leaving Europe after having graduated, Keatinge-Clay travelled across America and apprenticed for a year at Frank Lloyd Wright's Taliesin studios in both Madison and Scottsdale, Arizona. His time in the American west under the influence of Wright culminated in a year-long effort to make a Homestead claim on a piece of government property in the Arizona desert. Here, he built a pavilion in the desert – an elemental study of components that would later become the template for his own home – on the slopes of Mount Tamalpais in Corte Madera in Marin County.

Having left Arizona in the early 1950s, Keatinge-Clay moved to Chicago where he worked at the Chicago Offices of Skidmore, Owings & Merrill on both the Inland Steel and Harris Bank and Trust Buildings with Bruce Graham and Walter Netsch. It was in Chicago that he was in contact socially and professionally with Mies van der Rohe through his father-in-law, Siegfried Gideon, and the architect/engineer Myron Goldsmith. He later transferred to their San Francisco office where he executed the Great Western Savings and Loan Building in Gardena, California. In 1961, he left the firm and began his own office.

Keatinge-Clay's own office in San Francisco was located at 680 Beach Street in what is now the Fisherman's Wharf area. Concurrently with starting up his own practice, he was teaching and lecturing in schools around the Bay Area including the University of California at Berkeley, and San Luis Obispo.

During the 14-year period from 1961 to 1975, Keatinge-Clay produced several buildings several of which remain today. The first was the previously mentioned 1965 home for himself. This was followed by a medical office building in the San Fernando Valley in 1966 and the 1968 addition to the San Francisco Art Institute, an art academy situated in the heart of the city's elite Russian Hill neighbourhood. Finally, in what would turn out to be both the most ambitious and professionally tumultuous project of his career, he was selected to design the Student Union building at San Francisco State University. Difficulties, both technical and legal, resulted in his eventual departure from the US to Canada, followed by an exodus through North Africa sometime in the late 1970s.

During the latter portion of his time in San Francisco, Keatinge-Clay was recognised abroad when he placed as an honoured finalist in two competitions in the UK, both in 1972. In what could be seen as a return to his homeland, the first of these proposals was his design in London for an administrative office addition to Parliament at Westminster. The second was for a new art museum in Glasgow, Scotland, for which he received an honourable mention.

== Personal life and death ==
Keatinge-Clay married Verena, daughter of Siegfried Giedion and Carola Giedion-Welcker.

After leaving California in the 1970s, he lived near Mijas, Spain. He died there 17 March 17 2023, at the age of 97.

== Built works ==
A list of his works in the San Francisco Bay Area was prepared by Docomomo Northern California: https://www.docomomo-noca.org/paffard-keatinge-clay

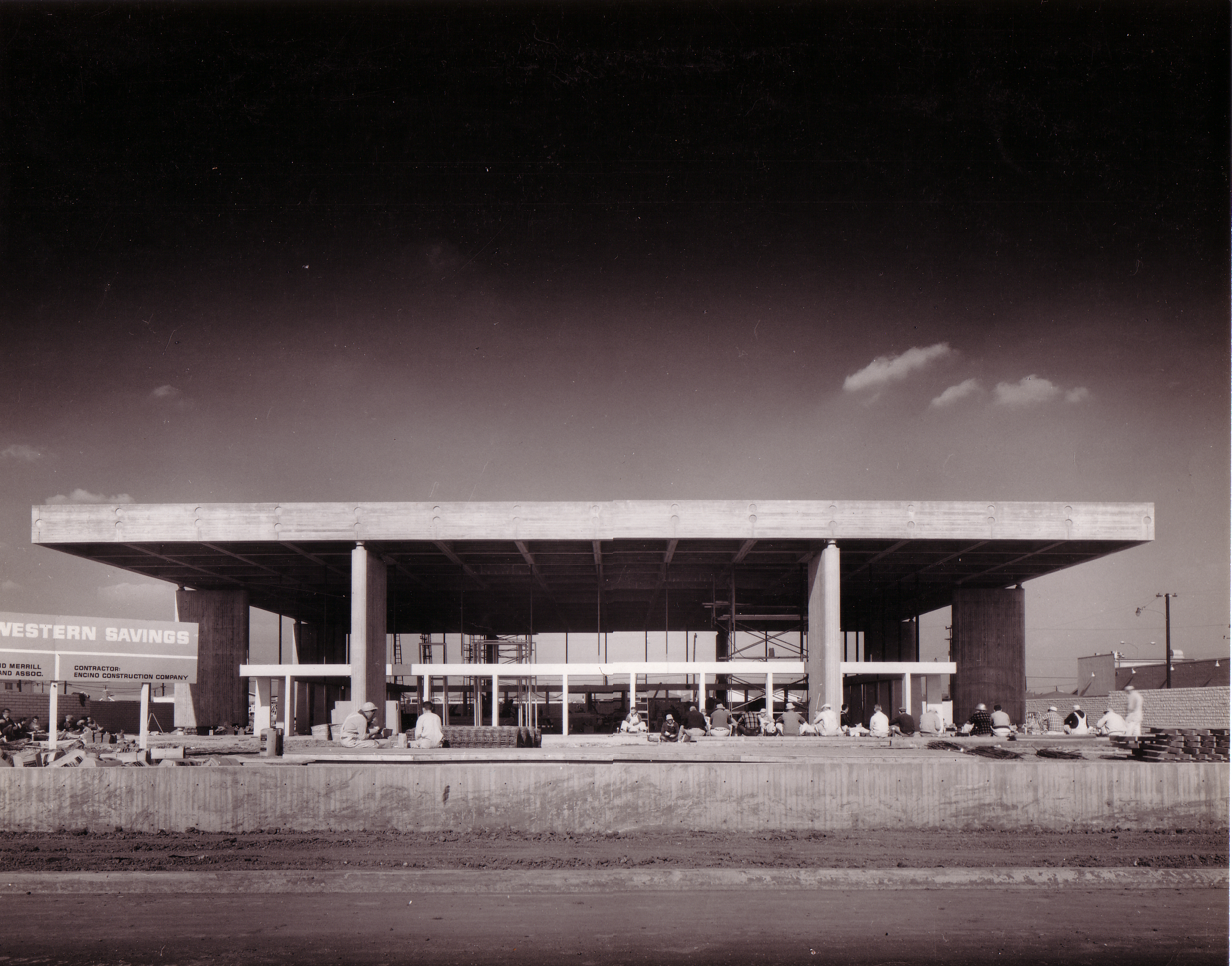
Great Western Savings and Loan facade.

Great Western Savings and Loan	Designed 1958–1960
2501 West Rosecrans Blvd.	Construction 1960–1961
Gardena, California	Renovated 1975
General Contractor:	Encino Construction Corporation
Cost of Project:	$540,000.00
Square Footage:	16,000sf

Description: A single story concrete branch bank building whose dominant feature is a post tensioned concrete roof with a clear span of 96 feet (29 m) and an overall dimension of 112 feet (34 m) square. The roof is supported by eight concrete piers with top and bottom pin connections. Designed by Keatinge-Clay while he was as an employee of Skidmore, Owings and Merrill, San Francisco with design partner Chuck Bassett.

Strauss Residence	Designed 1963
Diamond Heights, San Francisco, CA	Construction 1964

Paffard designed this house on Digby Street in San Francisco for Anne and Sherman Strauss, who lived here from 1963 to 2007. Since then the house was extensively remodeled, like enclosing the open courtyard, adding a second unit. However, the living room and details such as the stair and some flooring are in original condition.

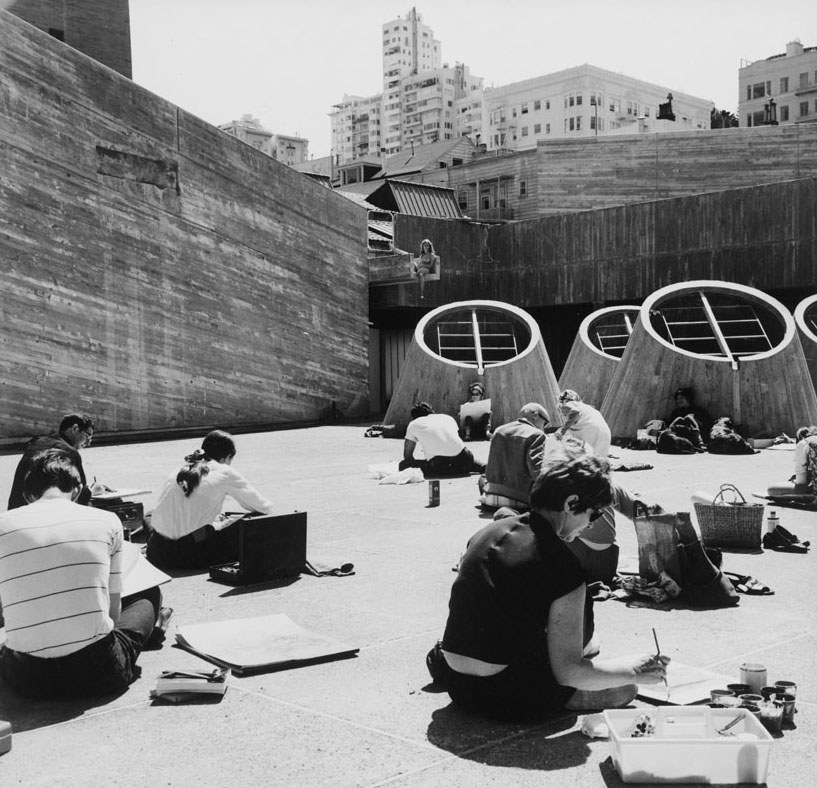
San Francisco Art Institute roof.

Addition to the San Francisco Art Institute	Designed 1966–1968
Russian Hill, San Francisco, CA	Construction 1969–1970

The 1969 SFAI project is an informed response to a unique and topographically challenging urban site to create a new city scape as functional as it is compelling. Here, an elongated north–south ramp (similar to LeCorbusier's 1961 Carpenter Center for the Visual Arts) is driven into and through (instead of between) the "working" art studios. Workshop space is shaped as a mass supporting a great, publicly accessible belvedere from which the entire city can be viewed in a 200-degree. This horizontal datum is then broken, horizon-like, by an architectural landscape of steps, terraces and pavilions that frame views of Alcatraz, Coit Tower, and the shifting pastoral maritime landscape of San Francisco Bay beyond. In so doing, the roof becomes the frame through which the viewer perceives both the city and its occupants. Quotations from similar Corbusian buildings of the period are everywhere such as the light cannons of LaTourette or the hand railings standard in the Atelier. On the other hand, concrete columns in the open studio spaces are monolithic cruciforms typical of Mies Van der Rohe rather than the rounded pilotis of Le Corbusier.

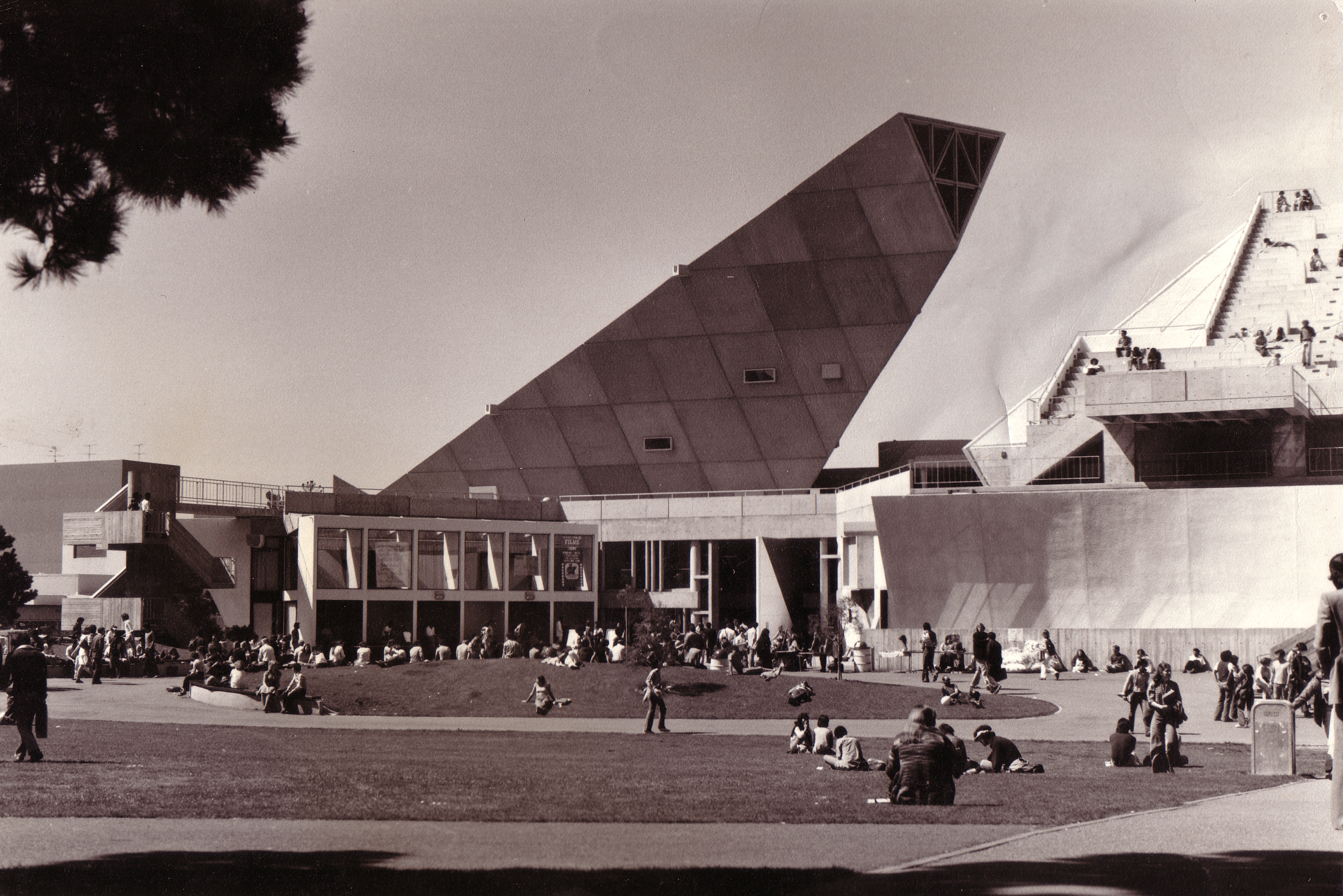
San Francisco State Student Center

San Francisco State Student Center	Designed 1969–1973
Sunset District, San Francisco, CA	Construction 1973–1975

Like its predecessor, the Art Institute, the building for San Francisco State shares a preoccupation with the horizontal in the creation of an artificial datum. The result of a competition and the byproduct of Moshe Safdie, who had previously been awarded the commission, Keatinge-Clay claimed the design to be the result of countless hours of collective workshops and collaborative student input. The student workshops resulted in two trapezoidal concrete pyramids: one that aligned sectionally with an axis to Polaris, the North Star, to create a space for "quiet, introspective activities", the other was composed of an occupiable roof terrace/theater, for "boisterous, public activities". More than half the program is buried below ground on a prominent site at the heart of the campus facing the main quadrangle. The whole is accessed through a pair of 30-foot (9.1 m) high enamelled steel offset pivot doors that open into a great public room on the interior of the building from which all functions were to be accessed. Structural expression was designed in the form of a triangulated series of poured-in-place concrete columns, ordered on a decidedly Wrightian "triagrid" plan module that hearkens back to the Usonian house studies of the late 1940s.

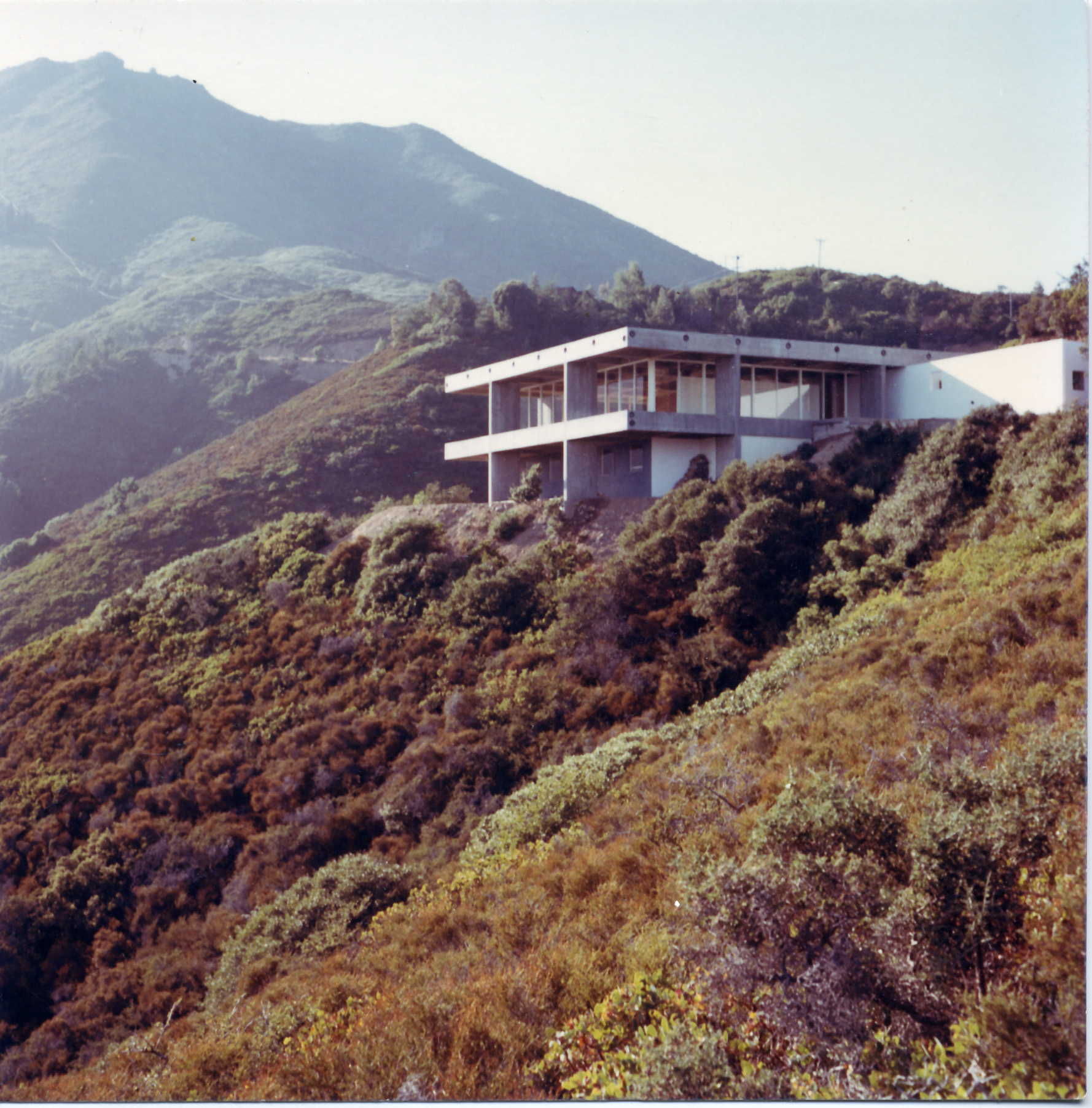
Tamalpais Pavilion

Tamalpais Pavilion	Designed 1962–1963
Summit Road, Corte Madera, CA	Construction 1964–1965

The Guide to Architecture in the San Francisco Bay Area of 1975 describes it with a single line: "Little more than a concrete moon viewing platform built for the Architect himself". Subsequently, the house has undergone a significant series of renovations and additional construction that no longer hint at its minimal beginnings. A symmetrical concrete pavilion stands atop a platform-like base, on which the "body" of the house is then supported by eight poured-in-place concrete columns that extend down to the topography running continuously below the floor. Domestic "space" occupies the sandwich between the two equally disposed square concrete slabs. The perceived thinness of the planes is achieved by means of an interlocking grid of post-tensioned concrete beams set both above the roof and below the floor to ensure the provision of uniform, column free "universal space" trapped between. Vertical supports are held back from the corners, allowing the ends to be cantilevered in space. Clear spanning glass panels, fixed and movable span vertically between the slabs, sliding open to the view, the fog and the breeze while allowing movement out onto open, covered terrace areas outside the glass envelope. The house was used briefly as a set for a locally produced feature film called the Crazy Quilt in 1966, made by John Korty who, as a neighbour, watched the house being built of poured cement and was inspired to write the screenplay of a man who loses houses to fire, earthquake and termites, then builds one that cannot be destroyed. Rocker Sammy Hagar rented the house in the mid-1970s, then bought it in 1977 with an advance from his album Musical Chairs. He continues to live in it.

French Hospital Office Annex	Design 1968
Geary Boulevard, San Francisco, CA	

A simple slab building standing free of the ground on sculptural concrete pilotis, the building shows most clearly the experience of the architect with the Unite building type. Other than its clarity of massing and simple façade articulation, there is little to suggest that it carries any particular pedigree other than the hand railings that are seen in all of the aforementioned projects. PKC office also masterplanned the entire site of additions to the Warnecke building on Geary, as well as designing the two level below grade parking structure and central garden.

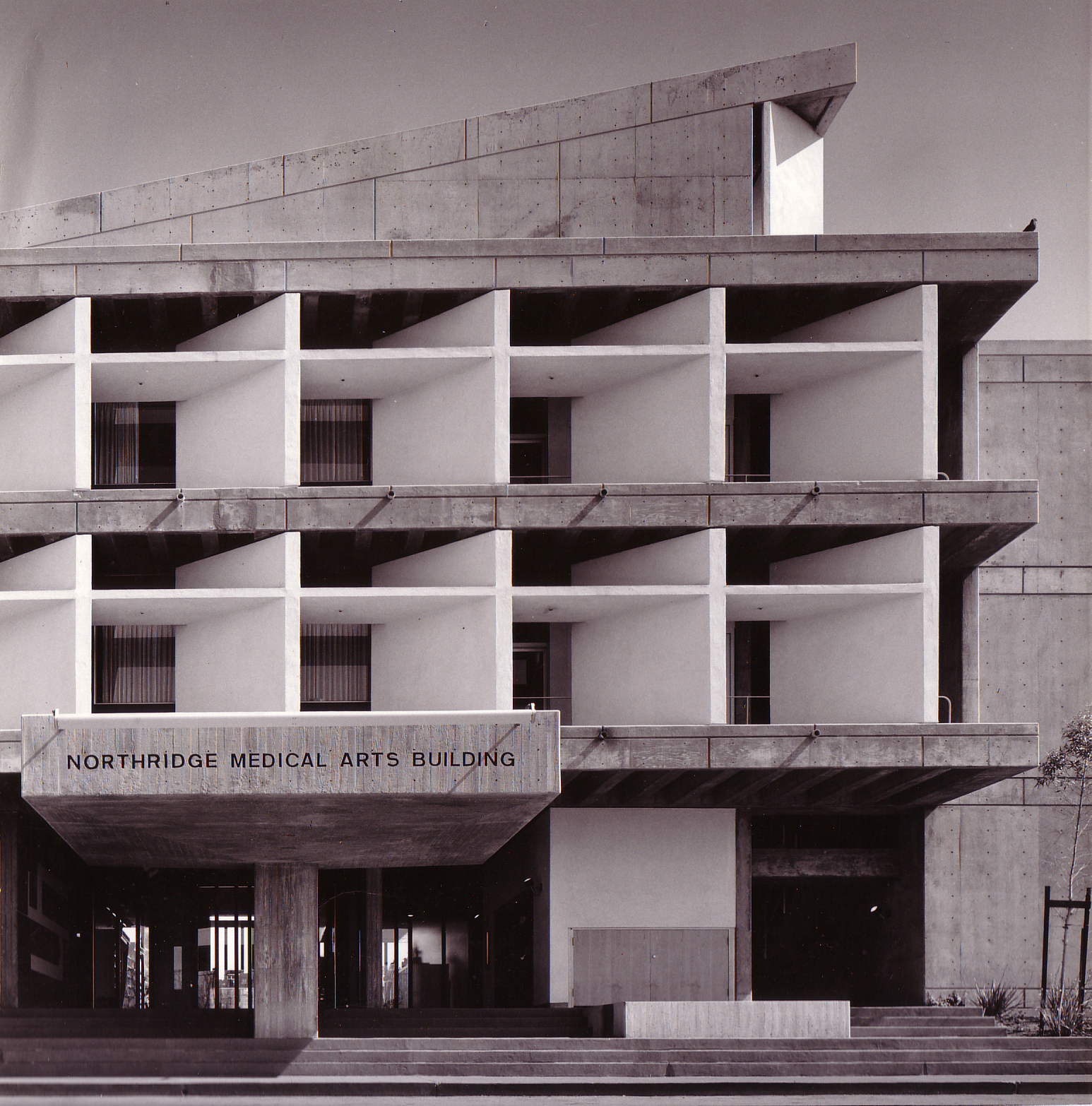
Northridge Medical Arts Building

Northridge Medical Arts Building	Design 1964–1965
Northridge, Los Angeles, CA	Construction 1966

A medical office building, it is a three-story high cast-in-place concrete structure with diagonal fins similar to those on the Art Institute at the upper two floors. The first floor had vertical mullions whose side-to-side spacing varied like Le Corbusier's La Tourette.

This project was done in association with the office of Dion Neutra in Los Angeles.

Ender Medical Building	Built 1964
141 Camino Alto, Mill Valley, CA	

Keatinge-Clay designed another medical office building during his productive late 1960s phase, this time in Mill Valley. The 2-storey building has open circulation on both levels, from where all office suites are accessed. Originally clad in redwood, the recent retrofits changed the appearance drastically. The renovation also replaced the handrails of the exterior staircase, which is still showing some of the concrete formwork that Keatinge-Clay is known for, with new different, current building code compliant handrail. On the backside, some of the original details, like window framing and crossbracing, can still be seen (State: 2023).

Novato Professional Building	Built 1965
1615 Hill Road, Novato, CA	

This square-shaped one-story office building, mostly used by medical professionals, consists of 4 identical wings, arranged around a central courtyard from where all professional/medical offices are accessed. The building frame is concrete; though only expressed in the columns. Both street and courtyard sides have a roof overhang, explaining the substantial depth of the roof system, that is expressed with the fascia. Originally clad in redwood, it's now covered with metal siding. The non-structural wooden brise soleils carry sharp edge details; and give it a distinct look from the street, now unfortunately covered by tall oleander shrubs.

== Artworks ==
=== Charcoal drawings ===
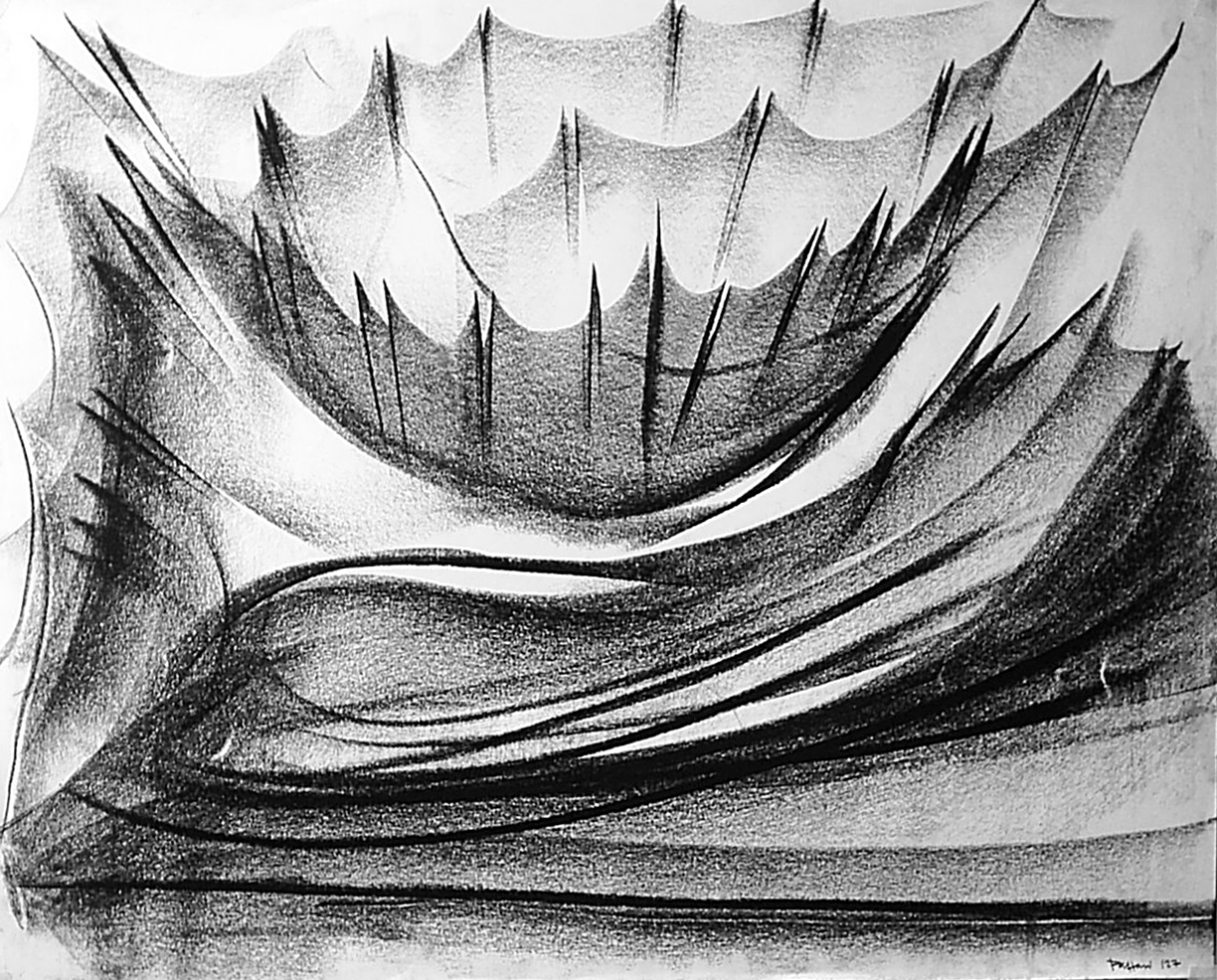
Paffard Charcoal Drawing 127

=== Murals ===
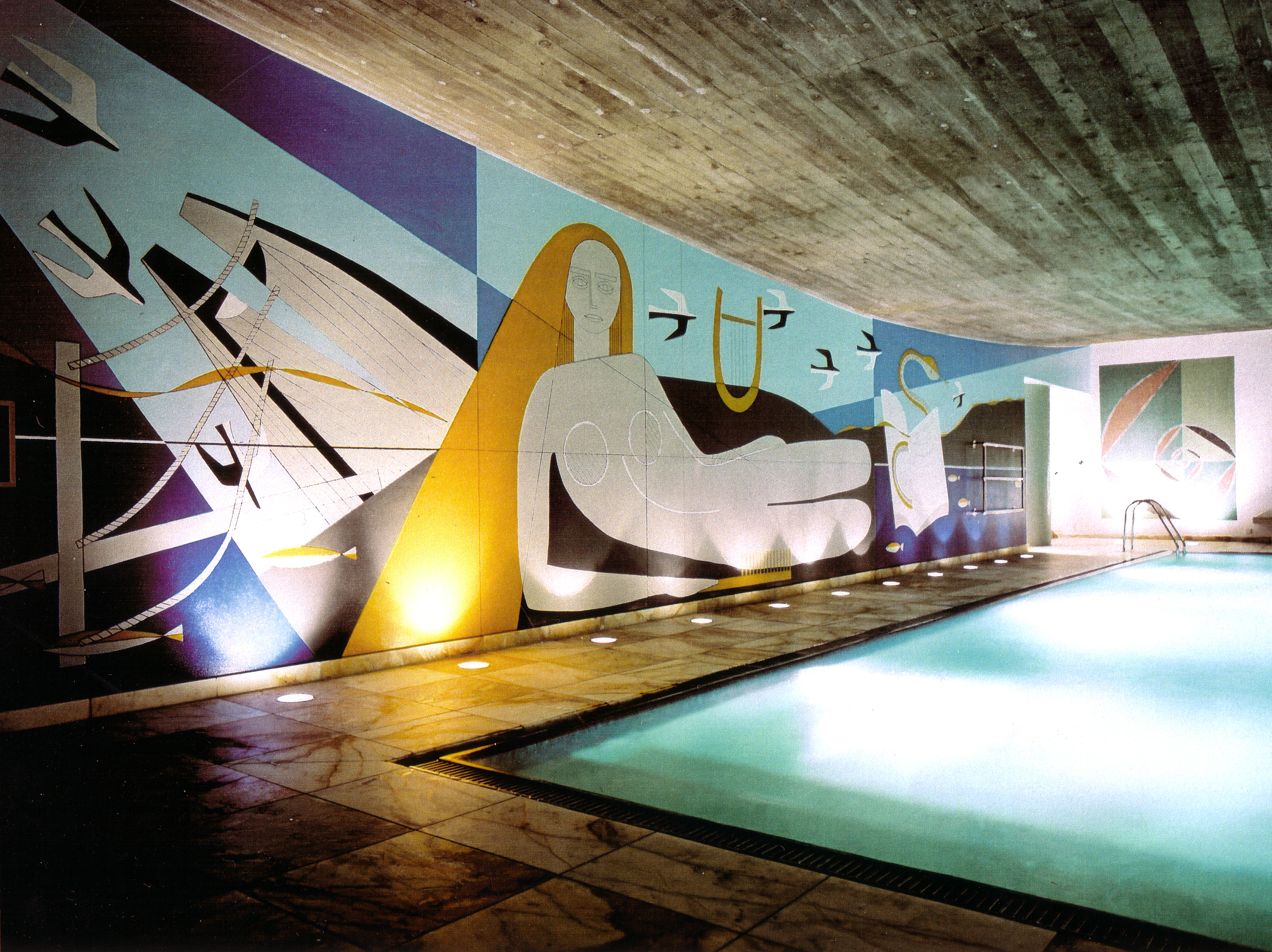
Lorelei Mural. Private collection.

- 1990 KWR The Granite Wall
- 1997 Düsseldorf Offices
- 2000 The Ox and the Maid
- 2003 Kindergarden
- 2003 The Lorelei
- 2007 The Loves of Juergen
- 2008 Color murals
- 2011 Symbols and Numbers

=== Literature ===
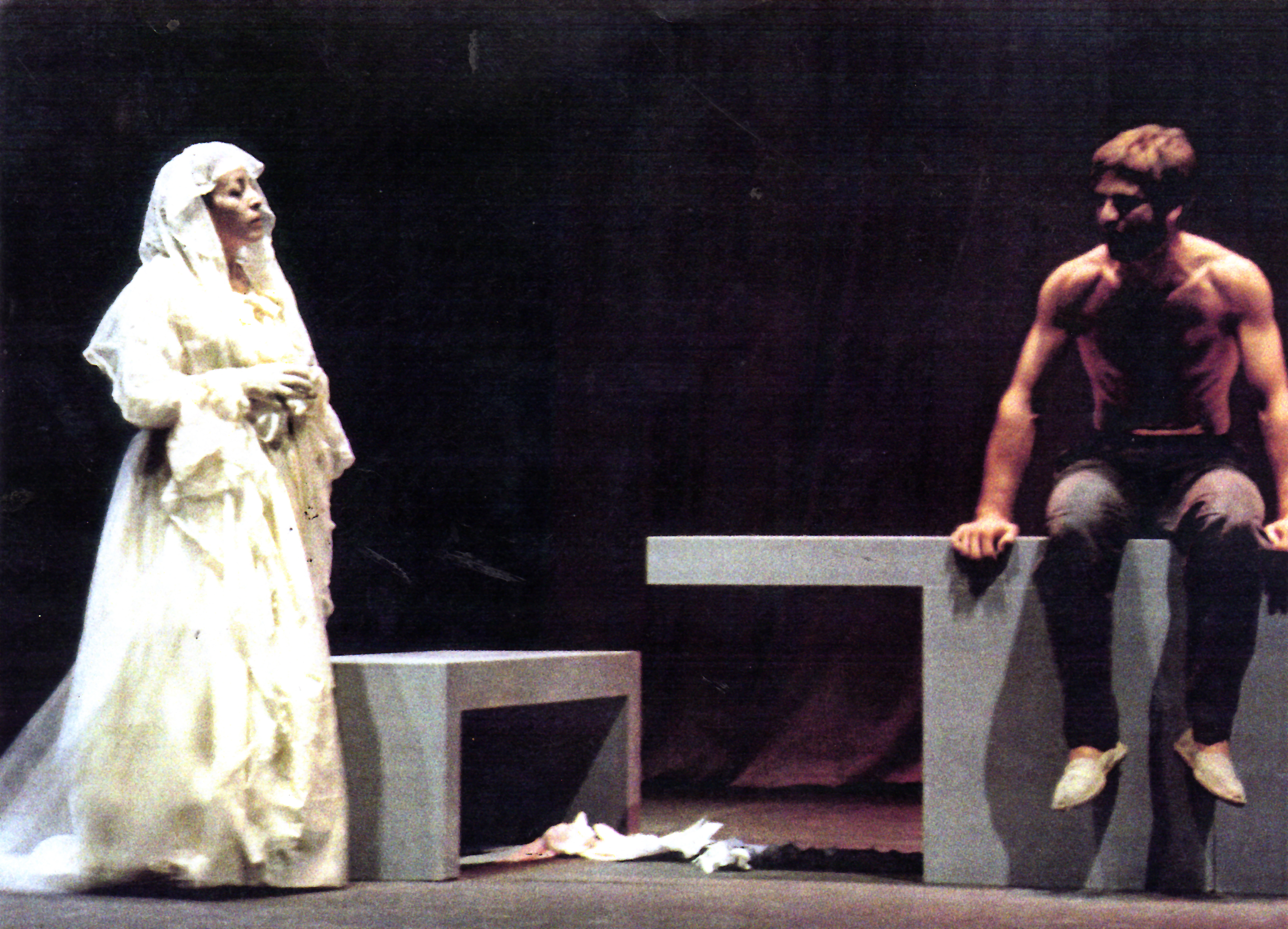
Theatre "A Solas"

- Theatre "A Solas" 1985
- Poetry "El Viaje" 1992

=== Art constructions ===
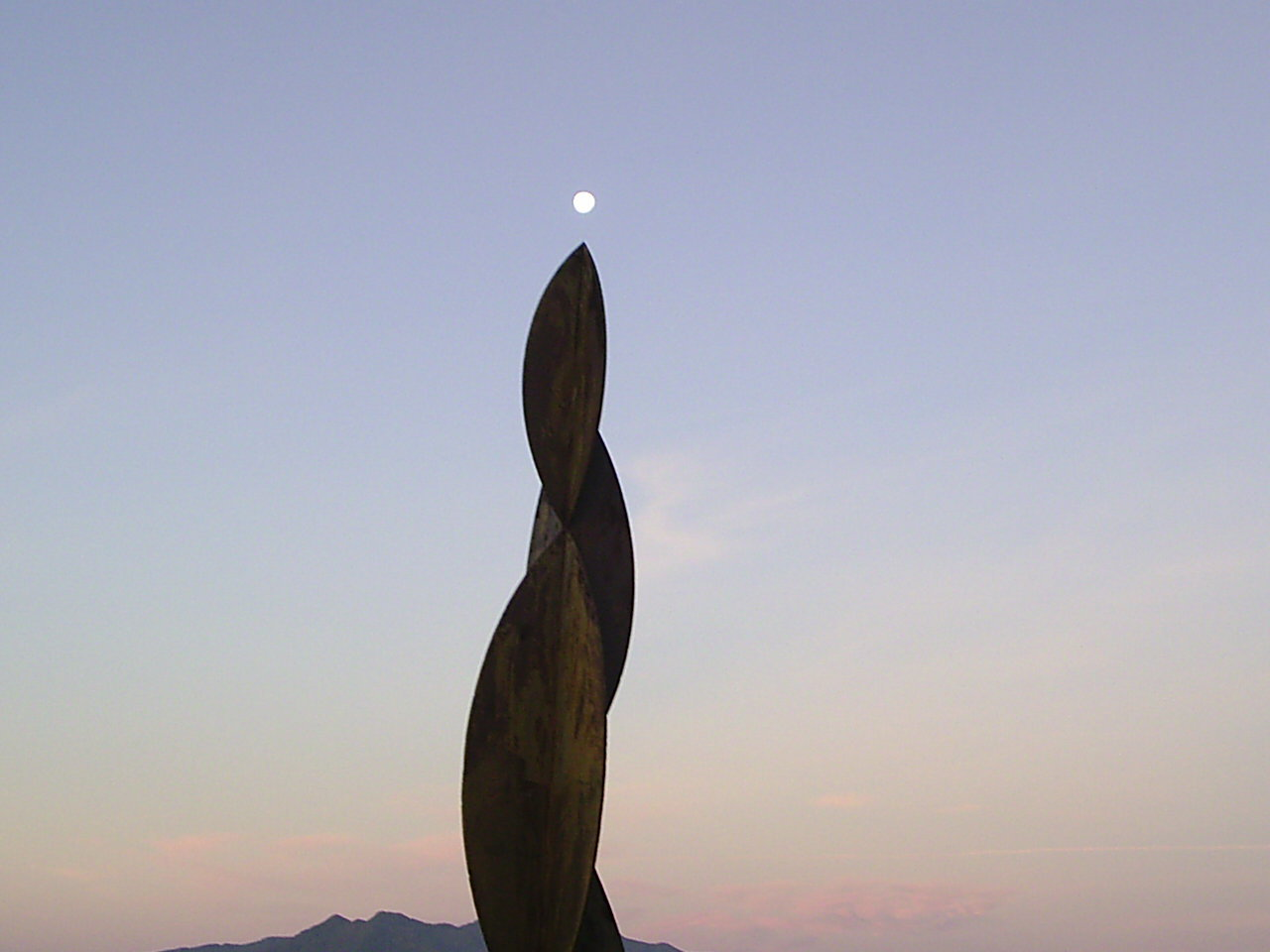
Fibonacci at the Finca.

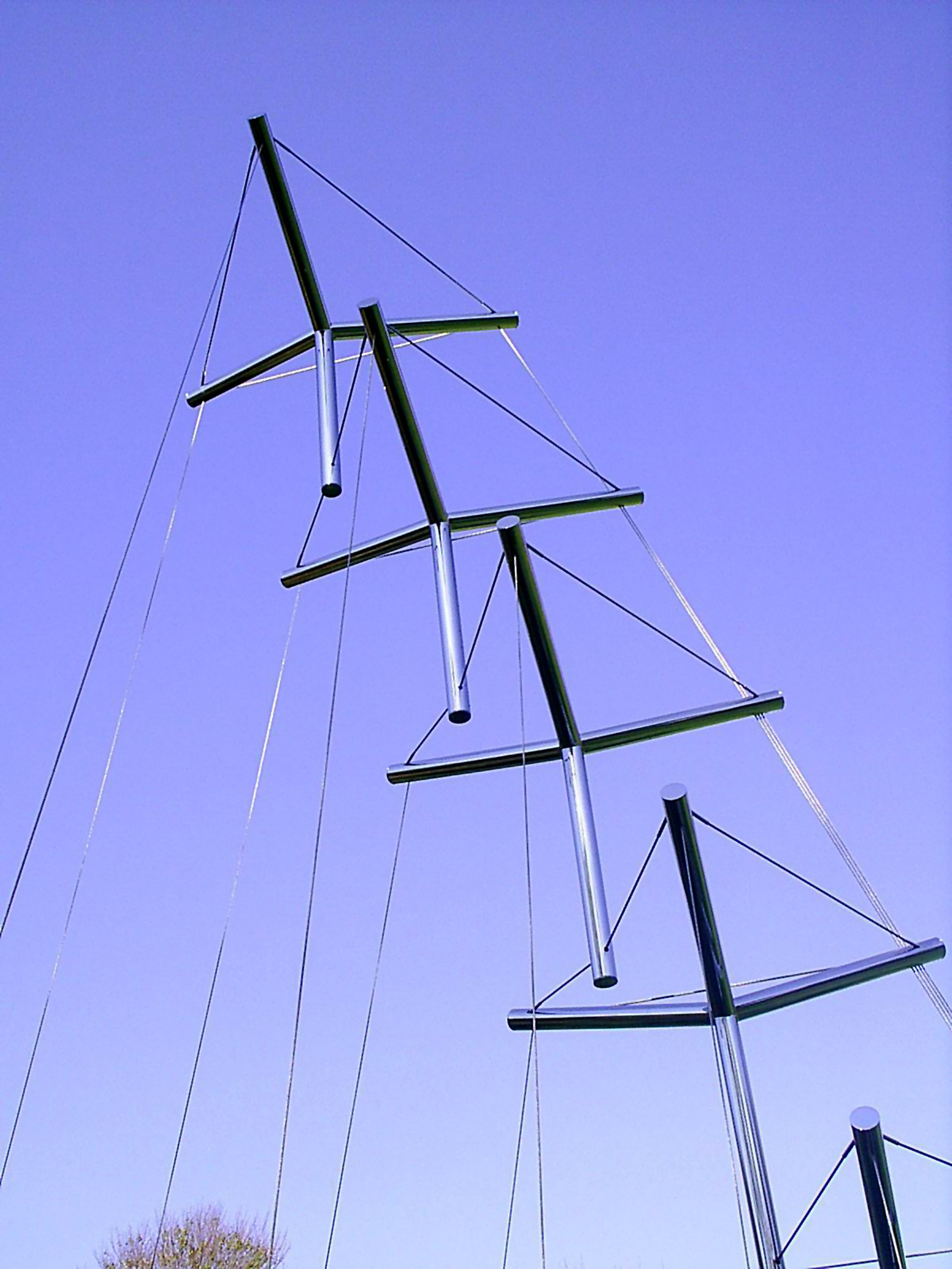
The Six Swans.

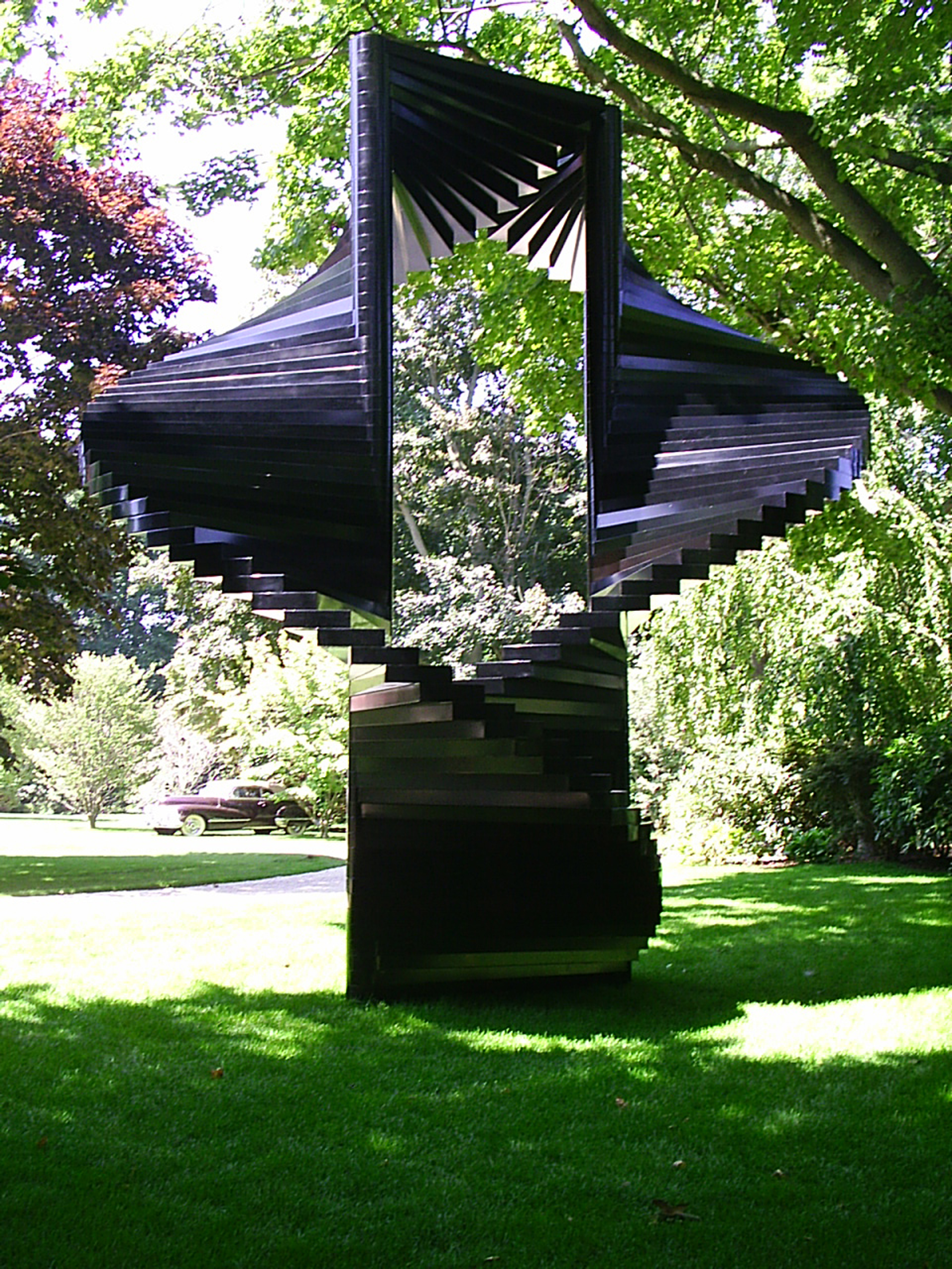
The Double Helix.

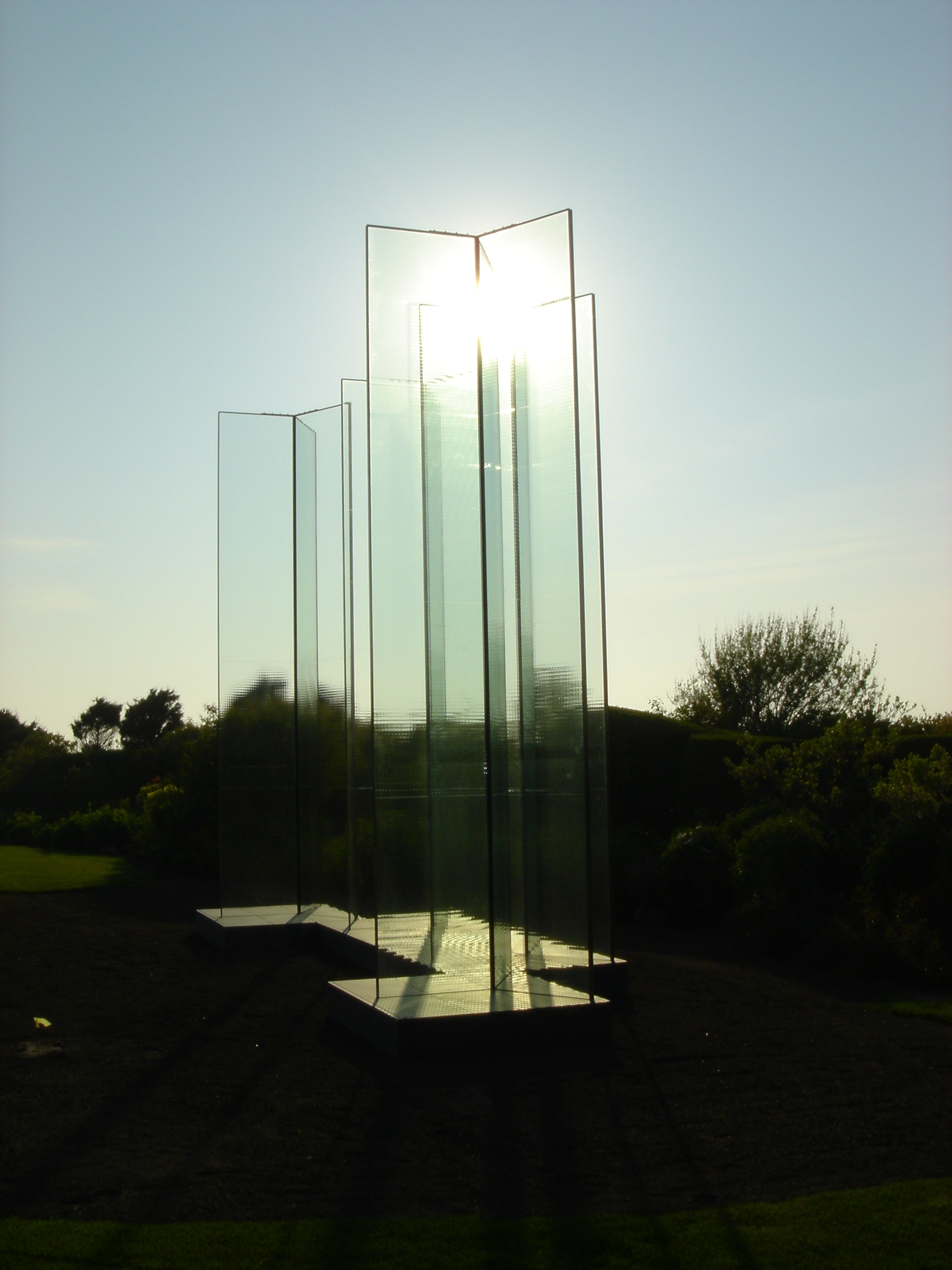
The Four Farhen.

- 1990 The Wind Warrior
- 1992 Dancing Flower
- 1992 Fibonacci
- 2000 The Whale
- 2003 Helix
- 2004 6SW Six Swans at Dancing Ox
- 2004 6SW Six Swans at Reinweg
- 2006 The Twins
- 2007 Double Helix
- 2007 P&P
- 2010 Four Farhen

=== Furniture design ===
- 1990 KWR Stools
- 1992 Isami Noguchi inspirated table
- 1999 AT Glass Table
- 2006 HHT Tisch Hexagon

== Prehistory works ==
=== Stonehenge ===
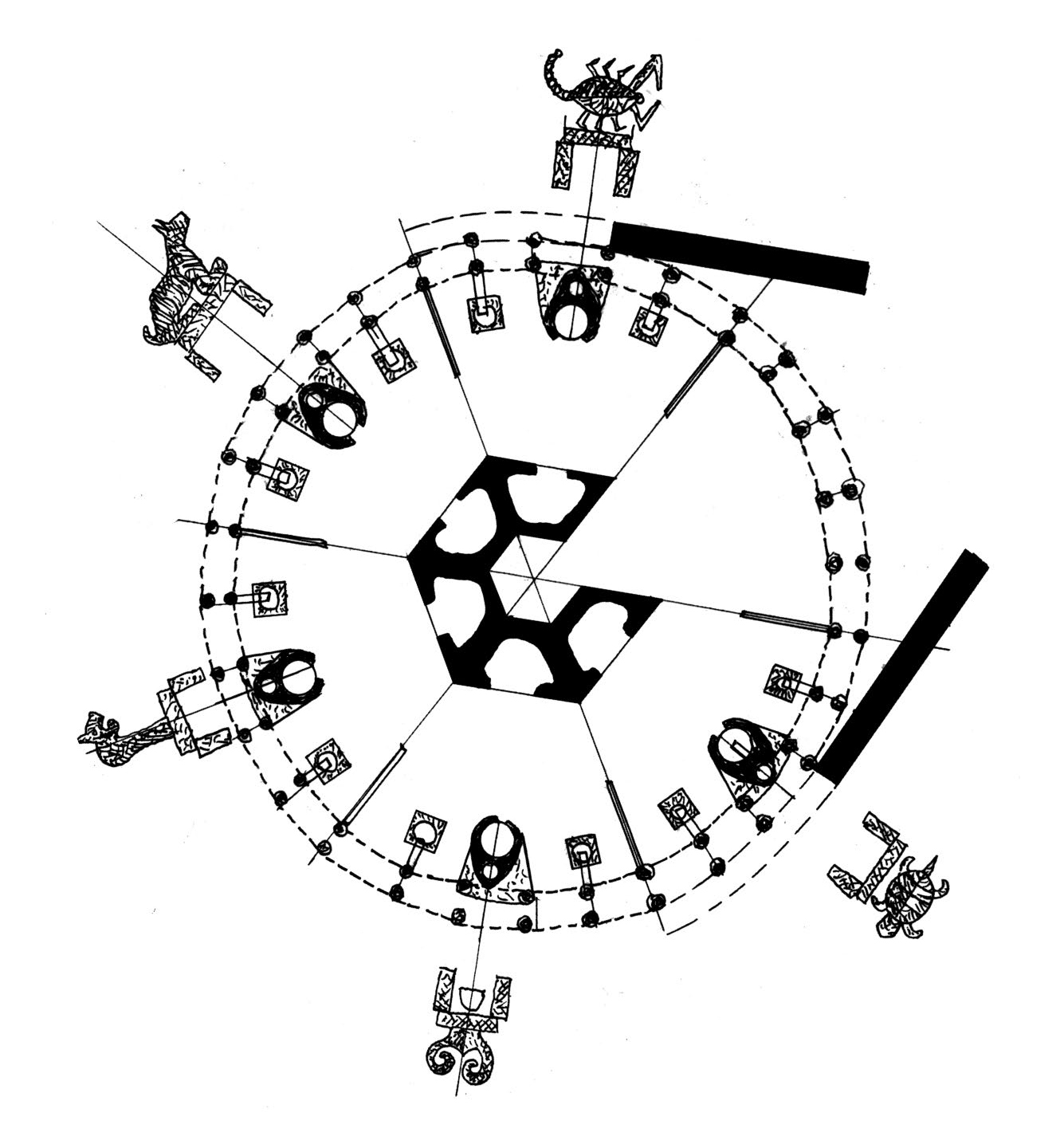
Precedent for Stonehenge.According to book in process "The Stones of Avebury" studies.

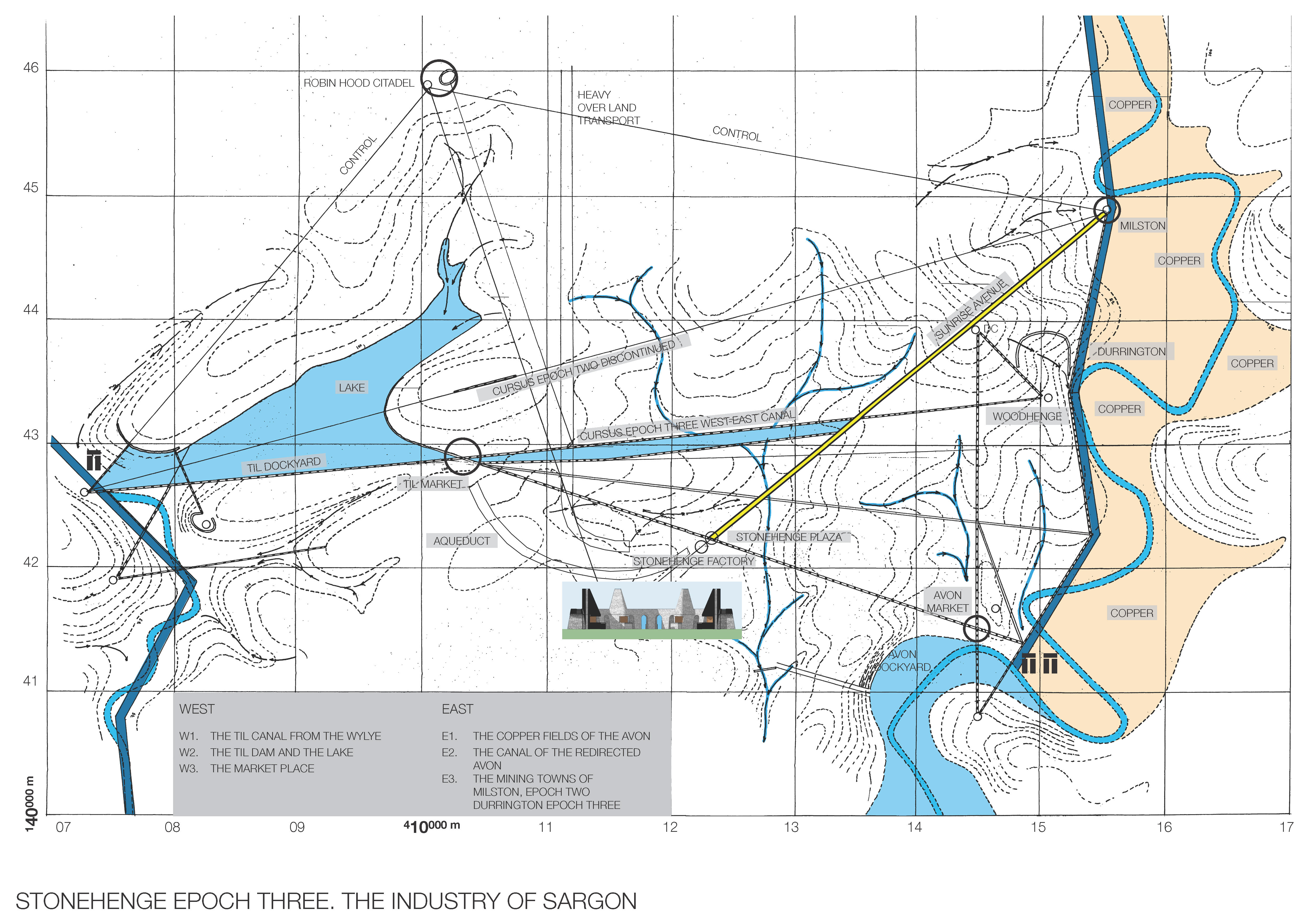
Interpretation of the industry of Stonehenge.According to book in process "The Stones of Avebury" studies.

Paffard Keatinge-Clay studied the prehistory of technology in a revolutionary way and prepared a document that threw a new light on what is known as Stonehenge.

== Other projects ==
Campus collocation planning studies in association with James Leefe, architect of the Pacific Lutheran Theological Center "Chapel of the Cross" at 2900 Marin in North Berkeley. Immaculate College and Pomona Colleges were for a time studying the idea of combining. The office was commissioned to design new dormitory buildings for this project in association with the office of Charles and Ray Eames.

== Bibliography ==
- Paffard Keatinge-Clay, Modern Architecture/Modern Masters. Eric Keune (2006), Sci-Arc Press.
- The Stones of Avebury (unpublished)
- The Odyssey of an architect (unpublished)
