= ACMI =

ACMI may refer to:

- A Certain Magical Index, a Japanese light novel series
- ACMI (museum) (Australian Centre for the Moving Image), an Australian institution dedicated to the moving image in all its forms
- Air Combat Maneuvering Instrumentation, a set of systems that record an aircraft's in-flight data during weapon range operations
- Aircraft, Crew, Maintenance and Insurance, a type of lease contract used in aviation, more commonly known as a Wet lease
- American College of Medical Informatics, a college of elected fellows who have made significant and sustained contributions to the field of medical informatics
- Archdiocesan Commission for the Pastoral Care of Migrants and Itinerant People, a non-profit social service organization in Singapore
- Art & Creative Materials Institute, Inc., an industry trade group composed of companies that manufacture art materials

== See also ==
- USS Chimo (ACM-1), a U.S. WWII minelayer
- ACML (disambiguation)
- ACM (disambiguation)
