= ACML =

ACML or variant, may refer to:

- AMD Core Math Library (ACML)
- Atypical chronic myeloid leukemia (aCML)
- American cutaneous and mucocutaneous leishmaniasis (ACML), a type of cutaneous leishmaniasis
- Asian Conference on Machine Learning, founded by Zhou Zhi-Hua
- Analytical Chemistry & Microscopy Laboratory, Forest Products Laboratory, U.S. Forestry Service

== See also ==
- ACMI (disambiguation)
