= Space, Time and Architecture =

1941 book by Sigfried Giedion

- Author: Sigfried Gidieon
- Genre: Architectural history/criticism
- Publisher: Harvard University Press
- Publication date: 1941, 1949 (2nd ed), 1954 (3rd ed), 1962 (4th ed), 1967 (5th ed)
- Pages: 960

Space, Time and Architecture: The Growth of a New Tradition is a book by Sigfried Giedion first published (by Harvard University Press) in 1941. It is a pioneering and influential standard history giving in integrated synthesis the background and cultural context of modern architecture and urban planning, set in their manifold cultural relationships "with other human activities and the similarity of methods that are in use today in architecture, construction, painting, city planning and science." The book was immediately recognized for the author's "monumental and catholic curiosity which compels him to penetrate long neglected nineteenth century by-lanes and reveal to modern eyes their importance for an appreciation of the complex culture of that period and our own."

The book had its genesis in the Charles Eliot Norton Lectures at Harvard University in the spring of 1938, and it was recognized from the outset as a series of related essays on seminal topics in the organization of human spaces, obtaining fresh insights, not from a panoramic survey, "but by isolating and examining certain specific events intensively, penetrating and exploring them in the manner of the close-up" as Giedion outlined his method.

Giedion revised and enlarged the book five times after the first edition in 1941: 2nd edition 1949; 3rd edition 1954; 4th edition 1962; 5th edition 1967. The book has continued to be printed since then, most recently in 2009. All editions have been published by the original publisher, Harvard University Press. The book has also been translated into German (Raum, Zeit, Architektur), French (Espace, temps, architecture), Spanish (Espacio, tiempo y arquitectura), Italian (Spazio, tempo, architettura), Japanese (空間 時間 建築) and Serbo-Croatian (Prostor, vreme, arhitektura). The major change from the first to the second edition was the predominance of coverage given to the Finnish architect Alvar Aalto, more than any other architect in the book, including Le Corbusier, when Aalto had barely been mentioned in the first edition. The reason given for this, is that Giedion saw Aalto as the architect best demonstrating the move away from International Style modernism synonymous with the Bauhaus towards a more organic architecture.
