= SETBP1 =

Protein-coding gene in the species Homo sapiens

Identifiers
- Aliases: SETBP1, SET binding protein 1, SEB, MRD29, SET bindign protein 1
- External IDs: OMIM: 611060; MGI: 1933199; GeneCards: SETBP1

Gene location (Human)
Chr.	Chromosome 18 (human)
Band	18q12.3	Start	44,680,173 bp
Band	18q12.3	End	45,068,510 bp

Gene location (Mouse)
Chr.	Chromosome 18 (mouse)
Band	18|18 E3	Start	78,793,595 bp
Band	18|18 E3	End	79,152,606 bp
RNA expression pattern
Bgee	Human / Mouse (ortholog); Top expressed in: ventricular zone; buccal mucosa cell; caput epididymis; saphenous vein; ganglionic eminence; tail of epididymis; urethra; seminal vesicula; superficial temporal artery; corpus epididymis / Top expressed in: spinal ganglia; ventricular zone; trigeminal ganglion; peripheral nervous system; ganglionic eminence; superior cervical ganglion; upper arm; mesenchyme; tail of embryo; genital tubercle; More reference expression data
BioGPS	n/a
Gene ontology
Molecular function	protein binding; DNA binding; DNA-binding transcription factor activity, RNA polymerase II-specific
Cellular component	nucleus; cytosol; nuclear body
Biological process	regulation of transcription by RNA polymerase II
Sources:Amigo / QuickGO
Orthologs
Databases	NCBI: entry; OMA: entry
Species	Human	Mouse
Entrez	26040	240427
Ensembl	ENSG00000152217	ENSMUSG00000024548
UniProt	Q9Y6X0	Q9Z180
RefSeq (mRNA)	NM_001130110; NM_015559	NM_053099
RefSeq (protein)	NP_001123582; NP_056374; NP_001366070; NP_001366071	NP_444329
Location (UCSC)	Chr 18: 44.68 – 45.07 Mb	Chr 18: 78.79 – 79.15 Mb
PubMed search
- Wikidata
View/Edit Human	View/Edit Mouse

SET binding protein 1 is a protein that in humans is encoded by the SETBP1 gene.

== Gene ==
The gene is located on Chromosome 18, specifically on the long (q) arm of the chromosome at position 12.3. This is also written as 18q12.3.

== Function ==
The SETBP1 gene provides instructions for making a protein known as the SET binding protein 1, which is widely distributed throughout somatic cells. The protein is known to bind to another protein called SET. SETBP1 is a DNA-binding protein that forms part of a group of proteins that act together on histone methylation to make chromatin more accessible and regulate gene expression. There is still more to learn about the overall function of the SETBP1 protein and the effect of SET binding.

== Clinical significance ==
Gain-of-function mutations in the SETBP1 gene are associated with Schinzel–Giedion syndrome.

Loss-of-function mutations in the SETBP1 gene are associated with a SETBP1-related developmental delay called SETBP1 disorder which causes a spectrum of symptoms including absent speech/expressive language delays, mild to severe intellectual disability, autism spectrum disorder, developmental delays, ADHD, and seizures.

SETBP1 is an oncogene; specific somatic mutations of this gene were discovered in patients affected by atypical Chronic Myeloid Leukemia (aCML) and related diseases. These mutations, which are identical to the ones present in SGS as germ line mutations, impair the degradation of SETBP1 and therefore cause increased cellular levels of the protein.
