= ACM =

ACM or A.C.M. may refer to:

== Aviation ==
- AGM-129 ACM, 1990–2012 USAF cruise missile
- Air chief marshal
- Air combat manoeuvring or dogfighting
- Air cycle machine
- Arica Airport in Amazonas Department, Colombia (IATA airport code ACM)

== Computing ==
- Abstract Control Model, for USB to act as a serial port
- Association for Computing Machinery, a US-based international learned society for computing
- Asynchronous communication mechanism
- Audio Compression Manager, Microsoft Windows codec manager

== Education ==
- Allegany College of Maryland
- Associated Colleges of the Midwest
- Association for College Management

== Medicine ==
- Alcoholic cardiomyopathy, a disease of the heart muscle
- Arrhythmogenic cardiomyopathy, a disease of the heart muscle

== Music ==
- Academy of Contemporary Music, in Guildford, England, UK
- Academy of Country Music
- Association for Contemporary Music, in the Russian Federation

== Organizations or businesses ==
- African Content Movement, a South African political party
- Alliance for Community Media
- American Center for Mobility
- American Ceylon Mission
- Anaconda Copper Mining Company
- Anti-Coalition Militia, anti-NATO Taliban in Afghanistan
- Anti-cult movement
- Asian Civilisations Museum, Singapore
- Association for Computing Machinery, an international computing research society
- Association of Children's Museums
- Australasian Correctional Management
- Australian Community Media
- Australians for Constitutional Monarchy
- Netherlands Authority for Consumers and Markets (Dutch: Autoriteit Consument & Markt)

== Technology ==
- Adaptive coding and modulation in wireless communication
- Advanced case management
- Alkyl acrylate copolymer, a type of rubber
- Aluminium composite material, used in sandwich panels
- Automated charging machine, a public mobile device charging station

== Other uses ==
- Another Chicago Magazine, a magazine founded by Barry Silesky
- Antônio Carlos Magalhães (1927–2007), Brazilian politician
- AC Milan, an Italian association football club
- AC Monza, an Italian association football club
- AECOM, NYSE symbol
- Asbestos-containing material
- Attorney–client matching
- Automobile Club de Monaco, a motoring club based in Monaco
- Iraqi Arabic, ISO 639-3 language code
- A US Navy hull classification symbol: Auxiliary minelayer (ACM)
