= Atypical chronic myeloid leukemia =

Type of leukemia

Atypical chronic myeloid leukemia (aCML) is a type of leukemia. It is a heterogeneous disorder belonging to the group of myelodysplastic/myeloproliferative (MDS/MPN) syndromes.

In aCML many clinical features (splenomegaly, myeloid predominance in the bone marrow with some dysplastic features but without a differentiation block) and laboratory abnormalities (myeloid proliferation, low leukocyte alkaline phosphatase values) suggest the diagnosis of chronic myelogenous leukemia (CML). However the lack of the pathognomonic Philadelphia chromosome and of the resulting BCR-ABL1 fusion point to a different pathogenetic process. Since no specific recurrent genomic or karyotypic abnormalities have been identified in aCML, the molecular pathogenesis of this disease has remained elusive and the outcome dismal (median survival 37 months) with no improvement over the last 20 years. This sharply contrasts with the outcome for CML, for which the prognosis was dramatically improved by the development of imatinib as a specific inhibitor of the BCR-ABL protein and in particular for CML.

In 2012 SETBP1 was identified as a novel oncogene in aCML; specific somatic mutations of this gene were discovered in people with aCML and related diseases. These mutations, which are identical to the ones present in SGS as germline mutations, impair the degradation of SETBP1 and therefore cause increased cellular levels of the protein.
