= Sigfried Giedion =

Swiss architectural historian (1888–1968)

- Born: April 14, 1888; Prague, Czech Republic
- Died: April 10, 1968 (aged 79); Zürich, Switzerland
- Occupation: Architectural historian
- Spouse: Carola Giedion-Welcker (m. 1919)

Sigfried Giedion (also spelled Siegfried Giedion; 14 April 1888 in Prague – 10 April 1968 in Zürich) was a Bohemian-born Swiss historian and critic of architecture. His ideas and books, Space, Time and Architecture, and Mechanization Takes Command, had an important conceptual influence on the members of the Independent Group at the Institute of Contemporary Arts in the 1950s. Giedion was a pupil of Heinrich Wölfflin. He was the first secretary-general of the Congrès International d'Architecture Moderne (CIAM), and taught at the Massachusetts Institute of Technology, Harvard University, and the ETH-Zürich.

In Space, Time & Architecture (1941), Giedion wrote an influential standard history of modern architecture, while Mechanization Takes Command established a new kind of historiography.

== Biography ==
Sigfried Giedion was born in Prague to Swiss-Jewish parents. His father was a textile manufacturer from Zugersee. He graduated from the University of Vienna in 1913 with a degree in engineering. Not wanting to enter the family business, he wrote poems and plays, one of which was staged by Max Reinhardt. He then received his Ph.D. in art history in Munich with Heinrich Wölfflin, graduating in 1922 with a thesis on Romanesque and late Baroque Classicism. This work aroused the interest of A. E. Brinckmann, a well-known art historian, who invited him to Cologne, an offer that Giedion refused because he was not interested in an academic career. Instead, in 1923 he attended the Bauhaus, where he met Walter Gropius. From that meeting he got closer to the Bauhaus and its protagonists, becoming himself a precursor of the modern movement.

In 1928, he founded, together with Le Corbusier and Helène de Mandrot, the CIAM, of which he was also general secretary. In the same year, he took part in the collective initiative Werkbundsiedlung Neubühl, one of the first residential centers in the style of the modern movement, remaining on the steering committee until 1939. He was also the builder of the Doldertalhäuser in Switzerland, which he saw as a manifesto of the new architectural movement, as well as the founder of Wohnbedarf AG, a construction company close to the modern movement. Through countless interventions in international trade journals, he expressed his support for Le Corbusier's League of Nations project in Geneva, won in 1927 but disqualified because the submission was in the wrong medium.

In 1938–39, he taught at Harvard University at the instigation of Gropius, where he gave the Charles Eliot Norton Memorial Lectures. These helped form the basis for his work, Space, Time and Architecture, the history of the modern movement published in 1941. In 1946, he became a professor at the ETH-Zürich (Federal Polytechnic School), a post he held until the 1960s, and which he alternated with another at MIT in the United States of America. During this time he wrote busily, both as a CIAM editor and as an independent author, about his research on modernity, most notably Mechanization Takes Command, a critical history of mechanization seen in its historical and sociological aspects.

== Personal life and family ==
In 1919, Giedion married Carola Giedion-Welcker, whom he met while they were both students of Wölfflin in Munich. She created a circle of avant-garde artists in Switzerland, which included Hans Arp and Aldo van Eyck. Their daughter Verena married the architect Paffard Keatinge-Clay.

In 1968, Giedion suffered a heart attack when walking home from the cinema. He died in Zürich on 10 April 1968.

== Works ==
- Spätbarocker und romantischer Klassizismus, 1922
- Befreites Wohnen, 1929, published in English as Liberated Dwelling, Lars Müller Publishers, 2019
- Space, Time and Architecture: The Growth of a New Tradition, 1941. Harvard University Press, 5th edition, 2003, ISBN 0-674-83040-7
- Nine Points on Monumentality, 1943
- Mechanization Takes Command: A Contribution to Anonymous History, Oxford University Press 1948
- Walter Gropius, work and teamwork, Reinhold Pub. Co. 1954
- Architecture, You and Me: The Diary of a Development, Harvard UP 1958
- The Eternal Present: The Beginnings of Art and The Beginnings of Architecture, 1964 [1957]
- Architecture and the Phenomenona of Transition. The Three Space Conceptions in Architecture, 1971
- Building in France, Building in Iron, Building in Ferroconcrete, Getty Research Institute, 1995, originally published in German as Bauen in Frankreich, Bauen in Eisen, Bauen in Eisenbeton (Leipzig: Klinkhardt & Biermann, 1928)
