= Loenen aan de Vecht =

Loenen Loenen aan de Vecht
- Village
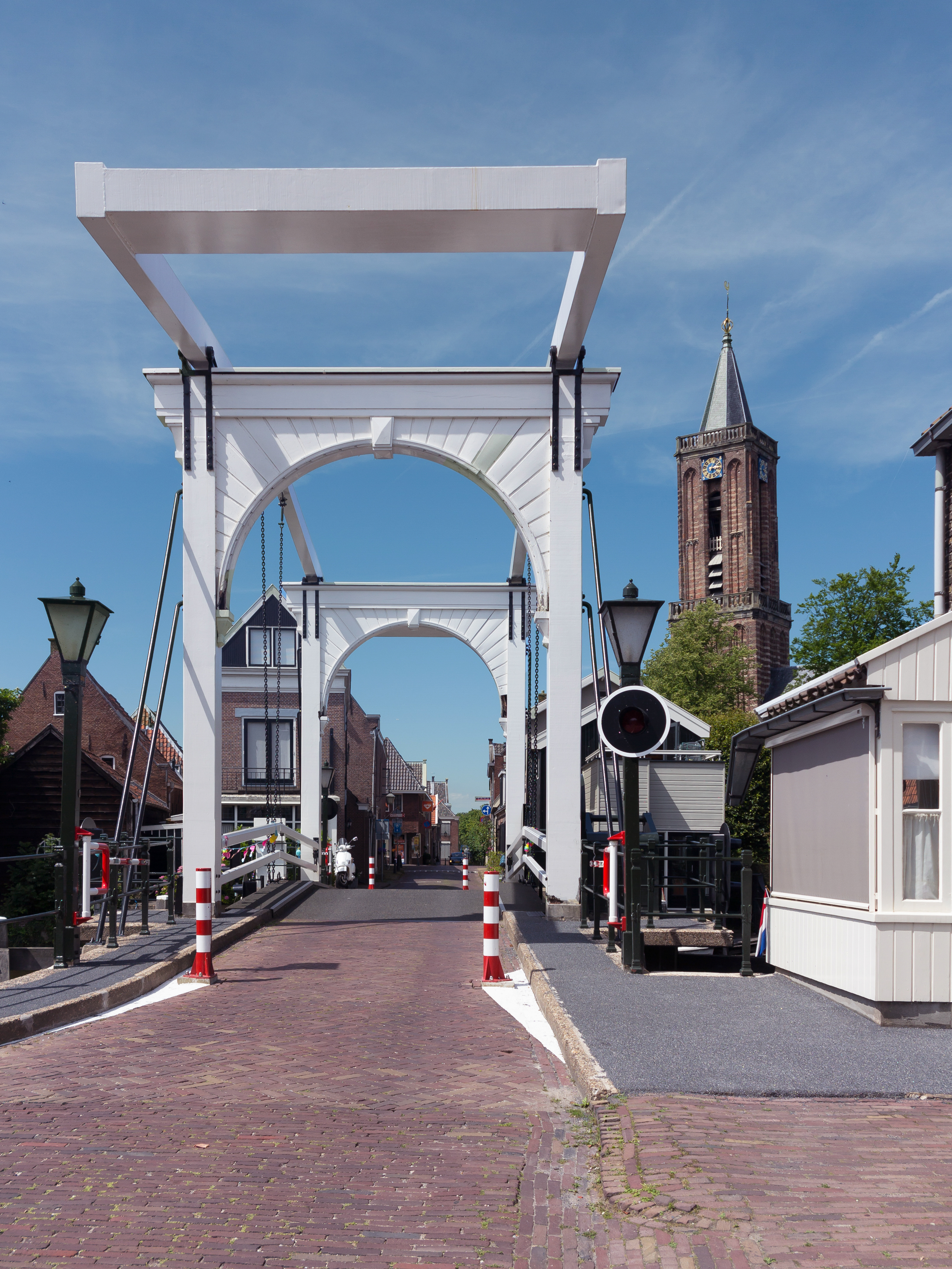
- Drawbridge with church tower

- Location in the Netherlands Loenen (Netherlands)
- Coordinates: 52.21092°N 5.023192°E
- Country: Netherlands
- Province: Utrecht
- Municipality: Stichtse Vecht

Area
  - Total: 8.64 km^{2} (3.34 sq mi)
- Elevation: 0.1 m (0.33 ft)

Population (2021)
  - Total: 4,410
  - Density: 510/km^{2} (1,320/sq mi)
- Time zone: UTC+1 (CET)
  - Summer (DST): UTC+2 (CEST)
- Postal code: 3632
- Dialing code: 0294

Loenen aan de Vecht (or just Loenen) is a village in the Dutch province of Utrecht. It was the main village in the former municipality of Loenen. Since 2011 it has become part of the newly formed municipality of Stichtse Vecht. It lies about 10 km west of Hilversum.

== History ==
The village was first mentioned in 953 as Lona, and is probably the name of a waterway. In 1978, it was officially named Loenen aan de Vecht to distinguish from the other villages named Loenen.

Loenen developed along the river Vecht. Castle Kronenburg was built next to the village in the 13th century. The castle was destroyed in 1296 after some of the murderers of Floris V, Count of Holland sought shelter in the castle. The area was confiscated by Holland and became an enclave within Utrecht. In 1354, the castle was rebuilt. In 1672, it was destroyed by the French. In 1710, an estate was built at the site, but demolished in 1837.

The Dutch Reformed Church probably dates from the 13th century. The tower dates from the 16th century. In 1945, the church was severely damaged by fire, and restored in 1950. There are many large estates near Loenen built in the 17th century by Amsterdam merchants. In 1840, Loenen was home to 965 people. The grist mill De Hoop was first attested in 1675. In 1900, it burnt down. In 1901, it was rebuilt with a steam engine in case there wasn't enough wind. It was in service until 1949, and started to become derelict. Between 2006 and 2007, it was restored and functions on a voluntary basis.

== Gallery ==
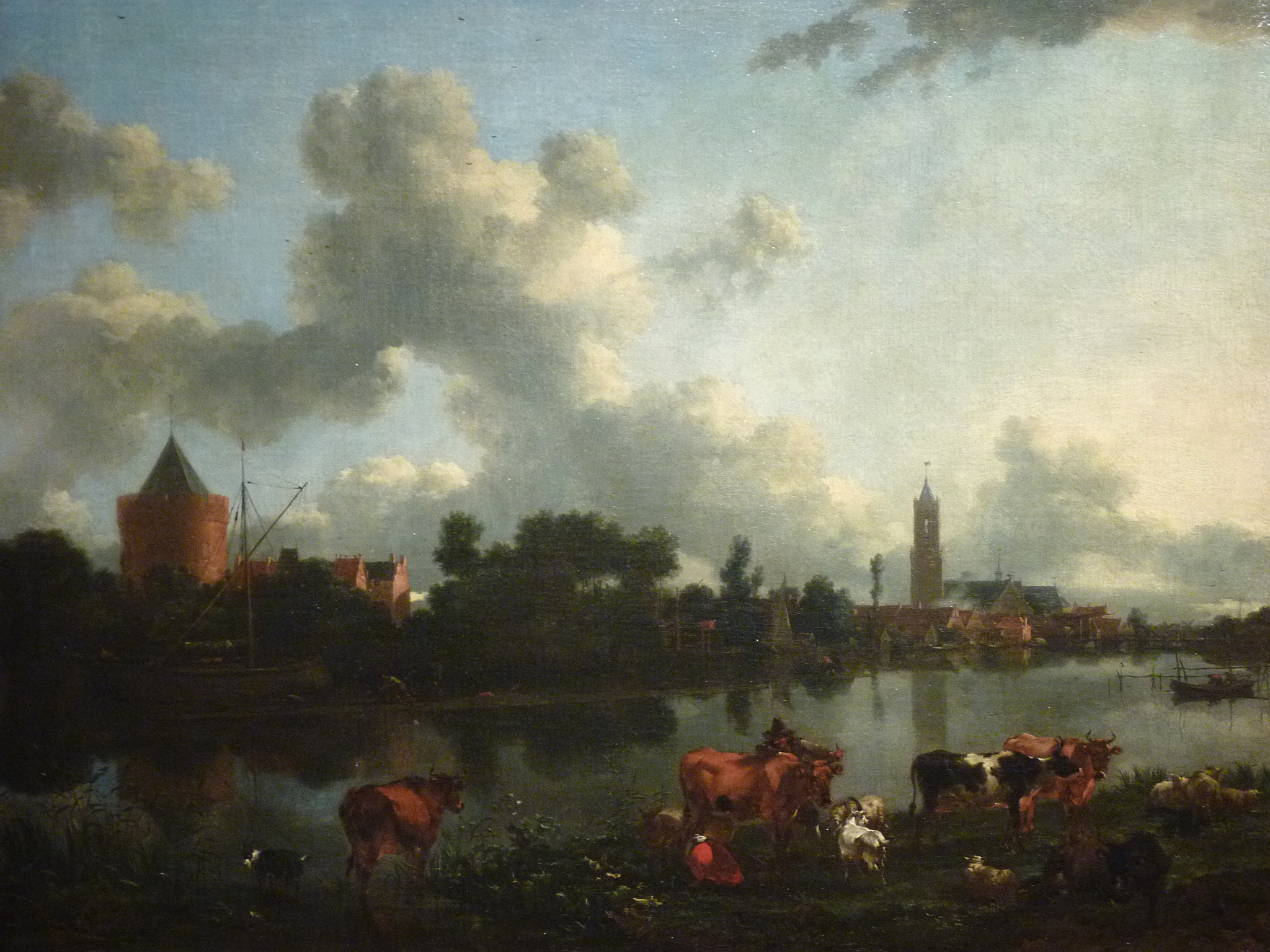
Loenen aan de Vecht by Nicolaes Berchem (after 1656)

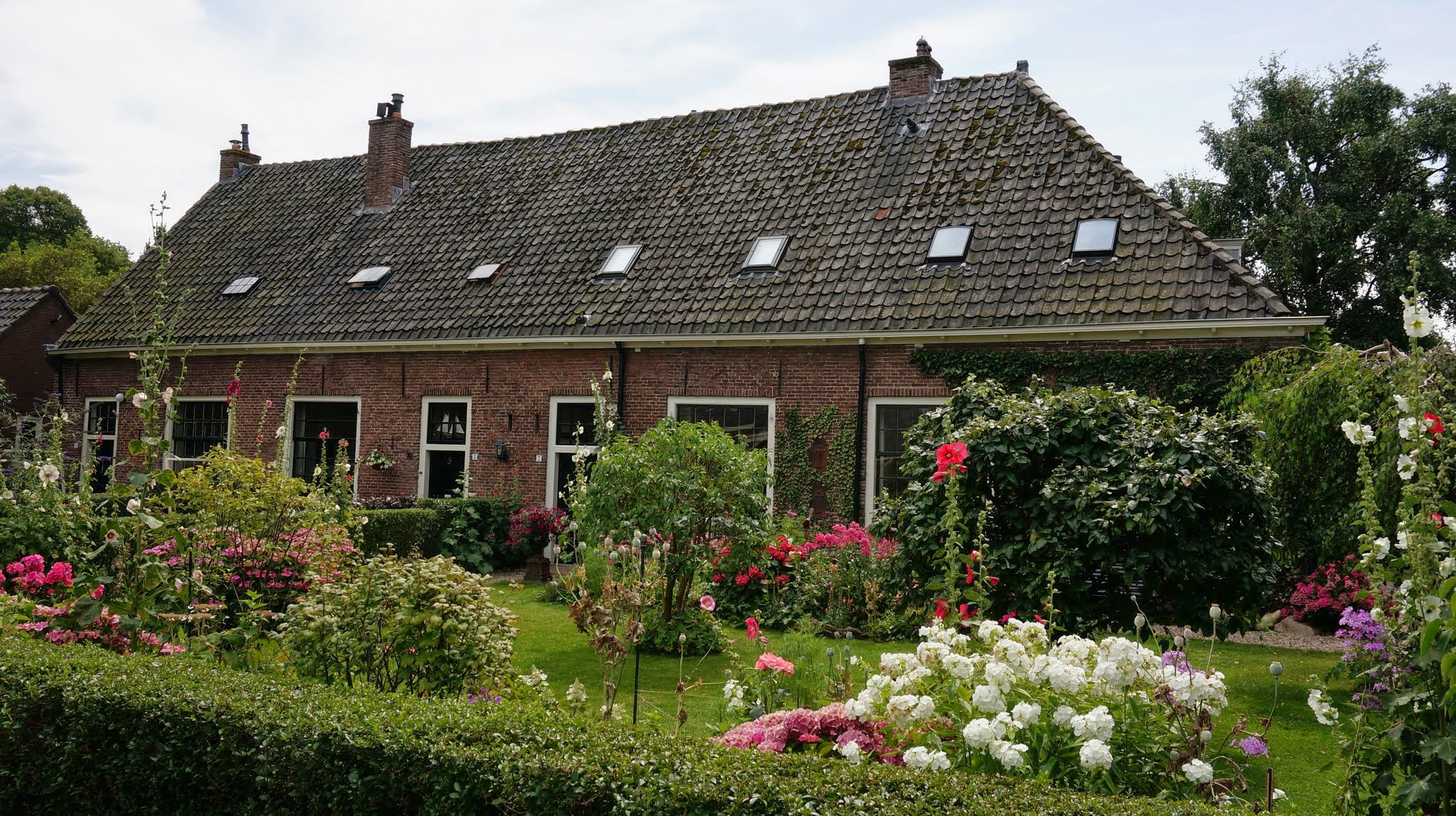
Row of houses

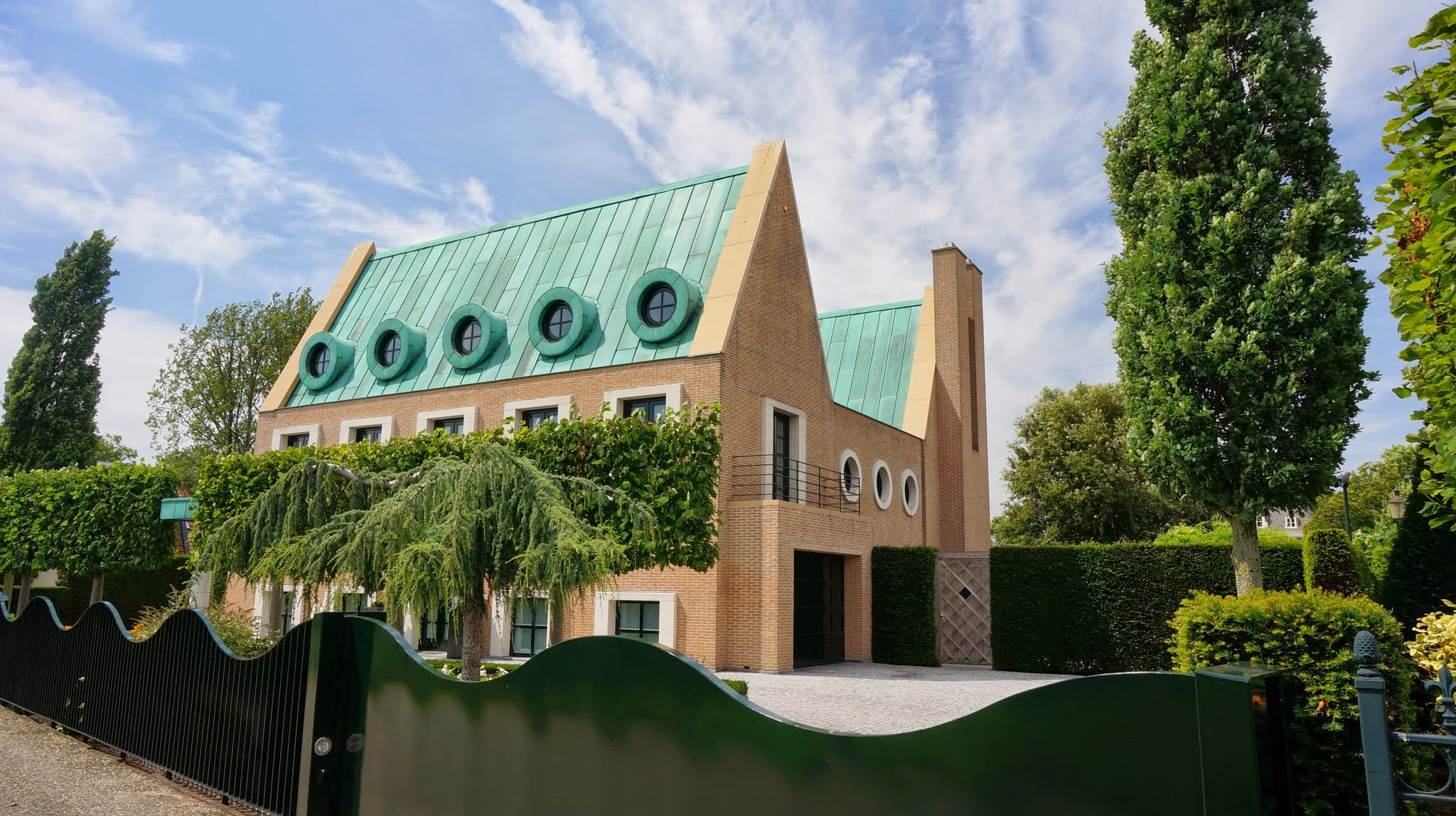
Modern building

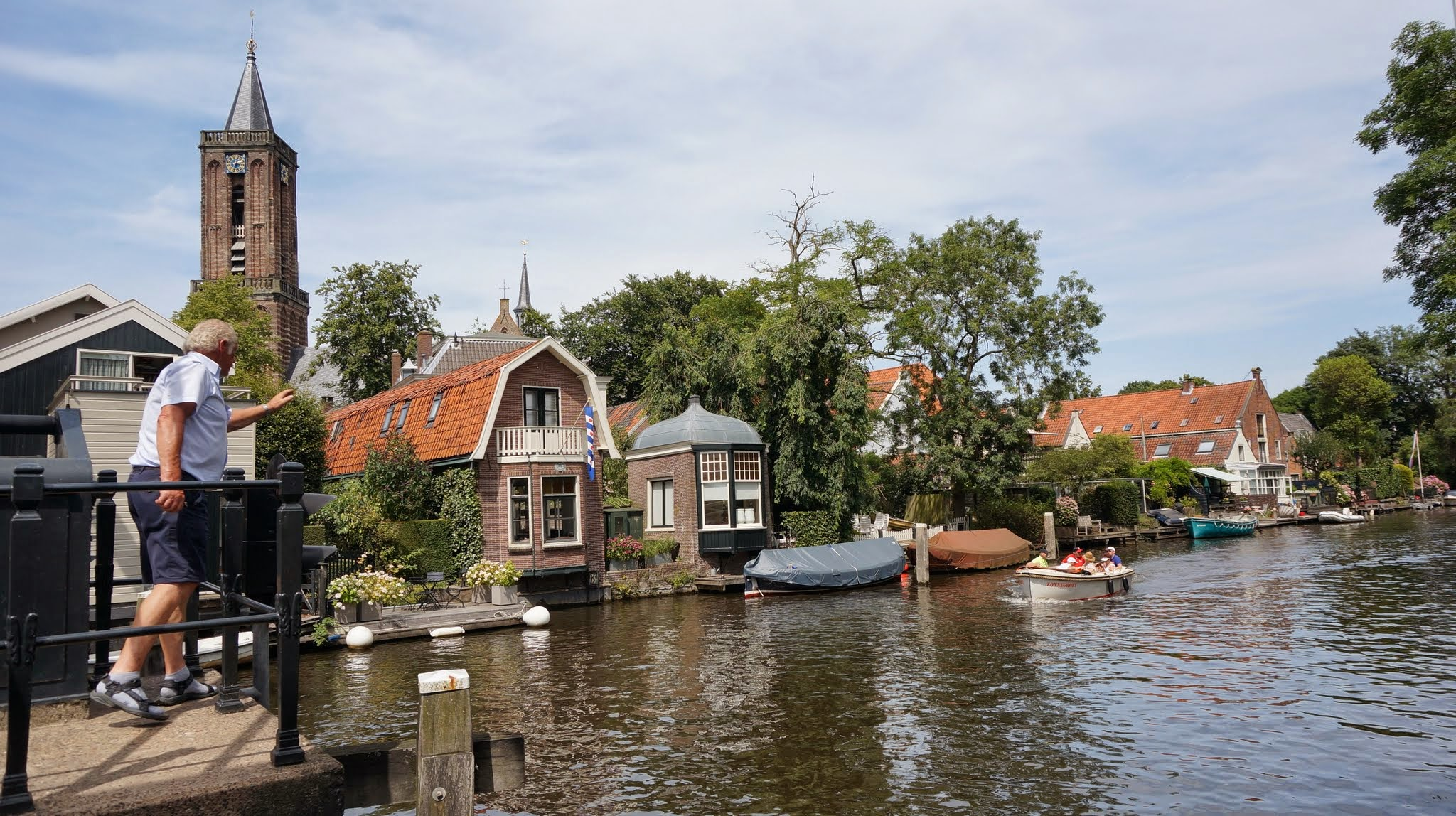
View from the Vecht
