= Schinzel–Giedion syndrome =

- Other names: Schinzel–Giedion midface retraction syndrome
- Specialty: Neurology
- Prognosis: Most individuals won't make it past childhood due to respiratory problems.
- Frequency: 0.0001%

Schinzel–Giedion syndrome (SGS) is a congenital neurodegenerative terminal syndrome. It was first described in 1978 by Albert Schinzel (1944–) and Andreas Giedion (1925–) as a syndrome with severe midface retraction, skull anomalies, renal anomalies (hydronephrosis) and other anomalies. It is caused by mutations of the SETBP1 gene. Children with Schinzel–Giedion syndrome have characteristic facial features, neurological problems, severe developmental delay, and often bone and organ abnormalities.

The disorder is classified into two types: classical and atypical. Classical SGS is caused by gain-of-function mutations in the mutational hot spot of the SETBP1 gene, and is associated with severe clinical symptoms. Atypical SGS is caused by gain-of-function mutations adjacent to (but not within) the mutational hot spot of the gene, and is associated with milder symptoms.

== Diagnosis ==
The diagnosis of classical SGS can be established in a proband (the subject being medical-genetically studied or reported on, often the first in the family to seek medical attention) based on clinical diagnostic criteria, or suggestive clinical findings and a molecular genetic test. The diagnosis of atypical SGS can be established with suggestive findings and a molecular genetic test.

The clinical diagnostic criteria of classic SGS are:

- presence of both of the following:
  - developmental delay, or in neonates, hypotonia; AND
  - characteristic facial features, including prominent forehead, midface retrusion, and short nose with upturned nasal tip; AND
- presence of at least one of the following:
  - hydronephrosis; OR
  - at least two of the following:
    - sclerotic skull base;
    - wide supraoccipital-exoccipital synchondroses;
    - elevated cortical density or thickness;
    - broad ribs.

Genetic testing options include a multigene panel that covers SETBP1 and other genes of interest (e.g., for differential diagnosis), or a comprehensive genomic testing. A heterozygous pathogenetic (or likely pathogenetic) gain-of-function mutation within the mutational hot spot establishes a classical SGS diagnosis, and such a mutation adjacent to (but not within) the mutational hot spot establishes an atypical SGS diagnosis.

== Symptoms ==
Patients with this can have hydronephrosis, seizures, visual impairments, or alacrima.

Sleep apnea may also be present.

== Prognosis ==
Most children with condition die before 2 years of age. With it being estimated that 50% will die before 2 years of age. Death during infancy is due to pneumonia, cardiac arrest, tumors, lung hypoplasia, or seizures.

The longest documented survivor is 15 years old. Children with this condition who survive past infancy have a higher risk of developing tumors.

== Causes ==
According to National Organization for Rare Disorders, the disorder is not inherited from the parents. It is caused by a new spontaneous mutation of the SETBP1 gene. The SETBP1 gene is a cancer promoting gene, and affected children who survive past three years of age are at risk for different types of cancer.

== Epidemiology ==
The prevalence of Schinzel-Giedion syndrome is estimated to be less than 1 in 1,000,000. About 50 to 80 cases have been reported in literature. Although the occurrence of this disorder is thought to be higher.

The condition affects both males and females equally.

== See also ==
- SETBP1
