= Carola Giedion-Welcker =

German-Swiss art historian (1893-1979)

- Born: 25 April 1893; Cologne
- Died: 21 February 1979 (aged 85); Zürich, Switzerland
- Occupation: Art historian
- Known for: Influence on modern art, writings on modern painting, sculpture, and poetry
- Spouse: Sigfried Giedion (m. 1919)

Carola Giedion-Welcker (née Welcker; 25 April 1893 – 21 February 1979) was a German-Swiss art historian.

== Life and work ==
Carola Welcker was born in Cologne on 25 April 1893, the daughter of a banker Carl Welcker (1848–1928) and his American wife Mary Legien (1865–1919). She studied art history in Munich under Heinrich Wölfflin, and in Bonn with Paul Clemen. She received her doctorate in Bonn in 1922. During her studies in Munich she met Sigfried Giedion, a Swiss fellow-student, and they married in 1919. In 1923 the couple met László Moholy-Nagy, who introduced them to Hans Arp a year later. Arp interested her in the literature of Lautréamont, Rimbaud, and Jarry, and persuaded her to attend the 1925 Surrealists exhibition in Paris. Through Arp she met Piet Mondrian and Constantin Brâncuși, whom she visited in his studio in 1928. She later wrote a monograph on him.

In 1925 the Giedions moved to Zürich. Their home became a meeting-place for modern artists such as Hans Arp, Sophie Taeuber-Arp, Kurt Schwitters and Max Ernst. Irish writer James Joyce was also one of her guests. Giedion-Welcker met Paul Klee in Bern and subsequently wrote a biography of him. A year before her death in 1946, Paul Klee's widow Lily Klee specified in her will that the care of her husband's artistic estate should be overseen by a commission that was to include her son, Felix Klee, Carola Giedion-Welcker, and the Bern collectors Werner Allenbach, Rolf Bürgi, Hans Meyer-Benteli and Hermann Rupf..

Giedion-Welcker published about 280 articles in magazines on modern painting, sculpture and poetry. She also wrote 17 books, including Moderne Plastik, Poètes à l'Écart and the anthology Schriften 1926–1971, published in 1973 by Reinhold Hohl.

In 2007 the Kunsthaus Zürich dedicated an exhibition to Carola Giedion-Welcker, curated by Cathérine Hug. It showed how as an art historian, author, and curator, she shaped the cultural life of the city and influenced the gallery's purchasing policy. About 40 works including paintings, sculpture, graphics, photos and letters were exhibited.

== Writings (selection) ==
- "Bayrische Rokokoplastik. J. B. Straub und seine Stellung in Landschaft und Zeit. [Bavarian Rococoplasty. JB Straub and his position in landscape and time"]. Law, Munich 1922 (= dissertation)
- Moderne Plastik. Elemente der Wirklichkeit; Masse und Auflockerung. Girsberger, Zürich 1937
- Sublimierung und Vergeistigung der plastischen Form bei Medardo Rosso [Sublimation and spiritualization of the plastic form by Medardo Rosso]. In: Architektur und Kunst, Vol. 41, 1954, pp. 329–334
- Sculpture of the XX. Century. Hatje, Stuttgart 1955
- Hans Arp. Hatje, Stuttgart 1957
- Constantin Brancusi. Benno Schwabe & Co, Basel 1958
- Alfred Jarry. A monograph. Arche, Zürich 1960 & 1988, ISBN 3-7160-3512-2
- Paul Klee, Rowohlt, Reinbek 1961, 17th edition 1995, ISBN 3-499-50052-3
- Schriften 1926–1971. Stationen zu einem Zeitbild [Writings 1926–1971. Stations to a time picture]. DuMont Reiseverlag, Ostfildern 1973, ISBN 3-7701-0630-X

== Literature ==
- Iris Bruderer-Oswald, Iris:, Das neue Sehen: Carola Giedion-Welcker und die Sprache der Moderne. Benteli Verlag, Zürich 2008, ISBN 9783716514504.
- Regula Krähenbühl (ed.): Avantgarden im Fokus der Kunstkritik. Eine Hommage an Carola Giedion-Welcker (1893–1979) ["Avant-garde in the focus of art criticism. A tribute to Carola Giedion-Welcker (1893-1979)"]. Files of the interdisciplinary symposium in Zürich, 22/23 October 2009 (= outlines volume 6). Zürich 2011, ISBN 978-3-908196-78-5
