= List of Bach choirs =

Bach Choir, Bach-Chor or Bachchor is the name of a number of organizations named after Johann Sebastian Bach, often performing his choral music exclusively, predominantly, or historically. Such organizations include:

== Canada ==
- Ottawa Bach Choir
- Bach-Elgar Choir, Hamilton, Ontario

== Germany ==
- Bach-Chor Bonn
- Münchener Bach-Chor
- Bachchor Stuttgart
- Bachchor Wiesbaden

== Switzerland ==
- Berner Bach-Chor, Bern
- Zürcher Bach Chor, Zurich

== United Kingdom ==
- The Bach Choir, London
- Aberdeen Bach Choir
- Bath Bach Choir
- Birmingham Bach Choir
- Bristol Bach Choir
- Bury Bach Choir, founded by Percy Hallam in 1932
- Derby Bach Choir, founded by Wallace Michael Ross in 1969
- Dorset Bach Cantata Club
- Oxford Bach Choir
- St Albans Bach Choir
- Sheffield Bach Choir

== United States ==
- Bach Choir of Holy Trinity, New York, New York
- Bach Choir of Bethlehem, Pennsylvania
- Back Choir of Pittsburgh
- Bach Festival Choir of Winter Park (FL)
- Phoenix Chorale, formerly the Phoenix Bach Choir, Arizona

== Other countries ==
- Chamber Philharmonic Taipei, and Bach Choir

== See also ==
- Bach Collegium Japan

== Sources ==
- "Ottawa's Bach pilgrims perform to highest standard". Ottawa Citizen. 2014-06-20. Archived from the original on 2014-06-27.
- Nolan, Mary K. (1989-02-04). "We're not Toronto and we're glad of it". Toronto Star. p. E2. ProQuest 435866238.
