= Le Laudi =

1924 oratorio by Hermann Suter

- di San Francesco d'Assisi (Cantico delle creature)
- Oratorio by Hermann Suter
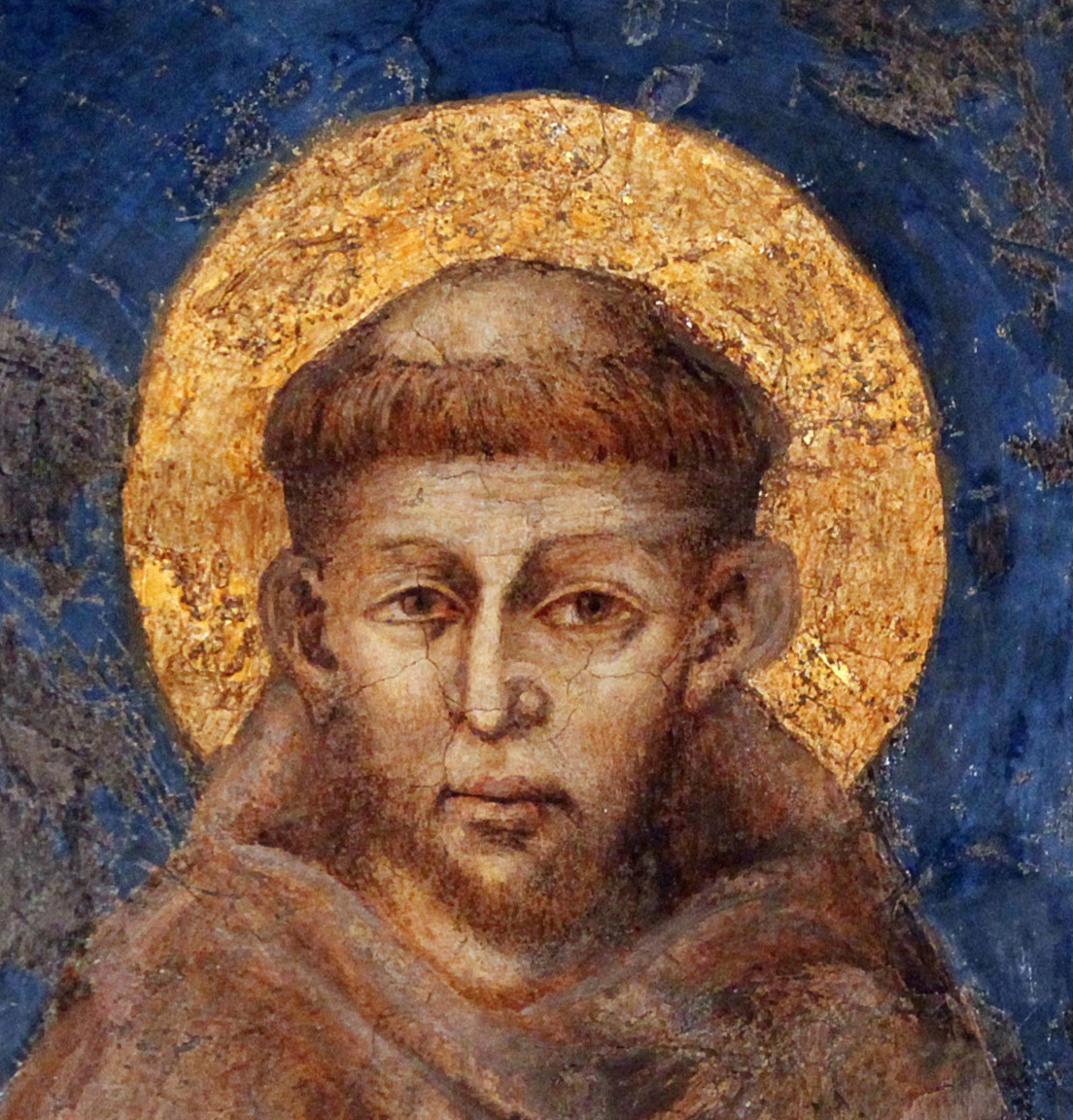
- Saint Francis of Assisi by the Italian artist Cimabue (1240–1302)
- English: The Praises
- Full title: Le Laudi di San Francesco d'Assisi
- Opus: 25
- Occasion: centenary of the Basler Gesangverein
- Text: Canticle of the Sun by Francis of Assisi
- Language: Italian
- Composed: 1924: Basel
- Dedication: in memory of the composer's parents
- Performed: 13 June 1924: Basel
- Movements: 9
- Scoring: Soloists; choir; children's choir; organ; orchestra

Le Laudi (The Praises), Op. 25, is an oratorio by the Swiss composer Hermann Suter. The full title is Le Laudi di San Francesco d'Assisi (Cantico delle creature) (The Praises of St. Francis of Assisi (Canticle of the Creatures)). The text is Francis of Assisi's Canticle of the Sun in the original Italian. Suter scored the work for soloists, choir, children's choir, organ and large orchestra. It was premiered in 1924, with the composer conducting the Basler Gesangverein on the occasion of its centenary. The oratorio of around 70 minutes is one of Suter's most important works and has been championed by conductors such as Wilhelm Furtwängler, who conducted the first performance in Vienna in 1926 and further performances in Europe. Although now performed relatively rarely elsewhere, it has been presented regularly in Switzerland. It was also recorded in 1991 and 2007.

== History ==
Suter composed the oratorio to mark the 100th anniversary of the Basler Gesangverein (Basel Choral Society). He was a central figure in the musical life of Basel, as the director of the symphony concerts of the Allgemeine Musikgesellschaft and director of the Liedertafel, municipal music school and conservatory. He was director of the choir from 1902. The composition emerged in the summer of 1923 in Sils in the Engadine, where Suter spent his holidays. The Italian text is the Cantico del Sole of Francis of Assisi.

== Scoring ==
The oratorio is scored for four solo voices (soprano, alto, tenor and bass), choir, children's choir, organ and orchestra. Suter wrote as a subtitle Cantico delle creature (Song of Creation) and gave the choir prime importance in the scoring: per Coro, Soli, Voci di ragazzi, Organo ed Orchestra. He dedicated it to the memory of his parents ("Dem Andenken meiner Eltern geweiht"). A performance lasts about 70 minutes.

== Structure and music ==
Suter composed nine movements, according to the praises of the canticle:

1. Altissimo onnipotente, bon Signore, (tenor, choir and children's choir)
2. Laudato sia, mio Signore, per sora luna e le stelle, (In modo dorico, soloists and choir)
3. Laudate sia, mio Signore, per frate vento (Fuga, soloists and choir)
4. Laudato sia, mio Signore, per sor' acqua, (Quartetto, soloist)
5. Laudato sia, mio Signore, per frate foco, (Passacaglia, choir)
6. Laudato sia, mio Signore, per sora nostra matre terra, (alto solo)
7. Laudato sia, mio Signore, per quelli che perdonano, (tenor and female choir, soprano solo and a cappella choir)
8. Laudato sia, mio Signore, per sora nostra morte corporale, (bass, choir and children's choir)
9. Laudate e benedite mi Signore (children's choir, choir and soloists)

The work is in the late-Romantic tradition, in particular the New German School, unaffected by the emerging dodecaphony. Suter drew on varied musical resources, including Gregorian chant, Impressionism, polyphony and counterpoint, for example in the quadruple fugue of the third movement and the passacaglia in the fifth movement. Suter used "pictorial and dramatic elements: the first movement evokes the sun", the sparkling of the stars is illustrated in the second movement, the roar of the wind in the third, gurgling water in the fourth, and the blaze and sparks of fire in the fifth. A gentle alto aria centers on Earth in the sixth movement. After the praise of nature, addressing the sun, the moon, stars and the four elements as brothers and sisters, man appears in the seventh movement, shown as forgiving and suffering. Death of the body, addressed as sister, is the topic of the eighth movement, and general praise concludes the work.

Suter included archaic elements such as unaccompanied singing similar to Gregorian chant in a tenor solo at the very beginning, and a cappella singing. He contrasts musical colours, such as mixed choir with the bright sound of the "ragazzi", tenor with female choir, and soprano with a cappella choir. The last movement reaches a dramatic climax but ends softly and pensively.

=== Movements ===
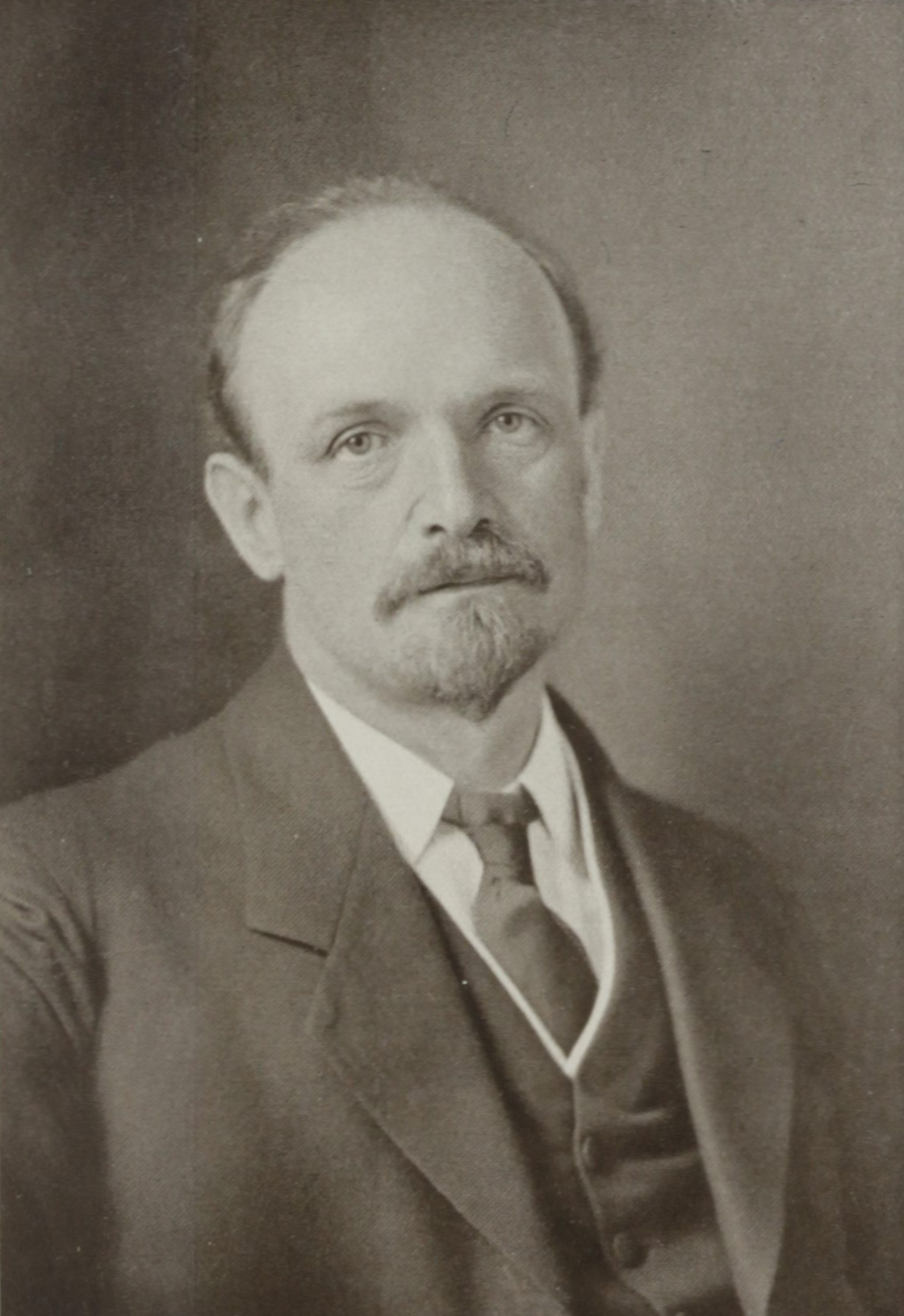
Hermann Suter (1870–1926)

==== 1 ====
In the first movement, the beginning Altissimo onnipotente, bon Signore, is sung by the tenor alone, similar to Gregorian chant. It is marked Introduzione, and Largamente. The choir, divided in six parts, repeats the same melody in homophony, accompanied by the orchestra. The text speaks of praise of the Almighty Creator. The tenor, echoed by the men's voices, continues by saying that the creatures are not worthy to name their creator.

An interlude leads to the Allegro section, which the children's voices (ragazzi) begin singing Laudate sia, mio Signore, con tutte le tue creature (Be praised, my Lord, by all your creatures). The other voices, now in four parts, imitate in polyphony. The first creature, frate sole (Brother Sun), is mentioned first by the solo tenor. The movement ends with a reminiscence of the first melody in hymnic homophony.

==== 2 ====
The second movement, Laudato sia, mio Signore, per sora luna e le stelle, is focused on Sister Moon and the stars. Marked Andante tranquillo, the orchestra supplies a shimmering and glistening basis for all four soloists, who sing one after the other, beginning with the soprano, and are answered by a four-part women's choir.

==== 3 ====
The third movement, Laudato sia, mio Signore, per frate vento, renders praises by Brother Wind. Marked Fuga (fugue) and Energico, ma non troppo allegro, it is set mostly for a four-part choir with orchestra. The brass begins with strong chords, followed by stormy runs in the strings, to which the voices add more and more complex fugues. Only a middle section is devoted to tranquil weather, depicted first by the solo voices. The movement ends in this mood, after another round of fugal singing.

==== 4 ====
The fourth movement, Laudato sia, mio Signore, per sor' acqua, has the praises by Sister Water. It is a quartet for the soloists, marked Amabile, tranquillo. The water is depicted by a continuous flow in the woodwinds.

==== 5 ====
The fifth movement, Laudato sia, mio Signore, per frate foco, is dedicated to Brother Fire. It is marked Passacaglia and Con vigore. The fire is depicted by arpeggios in the strings, above a ground bass of eight measures and 24 variations, sung by the four-part choir.

==== 6 ====
The sixth movement, Laudato sia, mio Signore, per sora nostra matre terra, focuses on the Earth, called not only Sister but also our mother. It is a solo for the alto, marked Adagio, ma non troppo. The voice rises from the low register at the beginning to graceful praise of flowers and fruits that earth produces.

==== 7 ====
In the seventh movement, Laudato sia, mio Signore, per quelli, che perdonano, per lo tuo amore, men and women appear, after the sun, moon, stars and the four elements. The movement begins, marked Andante soave, with the solo tenor echoed by the women's choir. The text first speaks of forgiving and love, then, intensified, of enduring sickness and tribulation. The soprano solo calls those blessed who wait in peace (Beati quelli, che sosterrano in pace), echoed by the choir.

==== 8 ====
The eighth movement, Laudato sia, mio Signore, per sora nostra morte corporale, focuses on Sister Death. It is a solo for the bass, with men's choir and children's choir, marked Tempo di marcia funebre. After a short introduction, the bass begins in the tempo of a funeral march. The choir echoes in harmonized homophony. After an agitated middle section, the movement closes with another benediction, Beati.

==== 9 ====
In the final movement, Laudate e benedite mi Signore, all forces join in praise. The children begin, leading to the main section marked Maestoso con allegria. The music grows in intensity and tempo but slows again with the final Amen and ends with a sustained last chord in many voices.

=== Evaluation ===
The work's intensity of expression and sound has been compared to Ein deutsches Requiem by Brahms, Christus by Liszt, Franck's Les Béatitudes and Verdi's Messa da Requiem.

== Performances and recordings ==
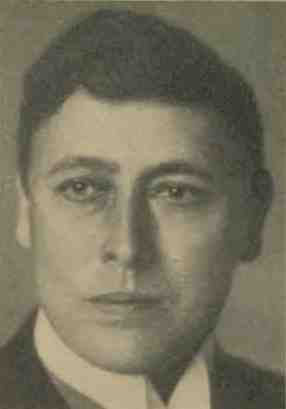
Karl Erb, tenor, 1912

The premiere of Le Laudi was on 13 June 1924 in Basel, conducted by the composer, with soloists Eva Bruhn, Maria Philippi, Karl Erb and Heinrich Rehkemper.

It was published the same year as Opus 25 by publisher Musik Hug. The work made Suter known beyond Switzerland. Wilhelm Furtwängler conducted it on 20 January 1926 in Vienna and directed further performances in the 1920s. In 1934, Karl Straube performed it in Leipzig. It is still performed today, particularly in Switzerland, where it has a continuous performance tradition.

The oratorio was recorded in 1991 by András Ligeti conducting soloists Alida Ferrarini, Vesselina Kasarova, Eduardo Villa and Marcel Rosca, organist Andras Virágh, the choir and children's choir of the Hungarian Radio, and the Budapest Symphony Orchestra, for the label MGB.

In 2006, the work was videotaped at the Coréades Festival in La Rochelle, France, conducted by Jean-Yves Gaudin, and was broadcast the following year.

In 2007, Theo Loosli conducted the Berner Bach-Chor and Bern Symphony Orchestra in a recording for the label Ars Musici.

The work was first performed in the United Kingdom by Choir 2000 on 21 June 2009 at the West Road Concert Hall in Cambridge. Choir 2000 performed the oratorio again on 23 June 2018 in the Saffron Hall, Saffron Walden, and in West Road Concert Hall in Cambridge on 24 June 2018.
