= Come and sing =

Temporary choir that rehearses or performs choral music, often within a single day

A "come and sing" event offers people who enjoy singing the opportunity to form a temporary choir ("scratch choir") to rehearse and/or perform choral music, often within a single day.

These events typically involve people who would otherwise be unable to commit to regular membership of a choir, or who wish to try choral singing for the first time. Usually the music is familiar mainstream classic works e.g. Handel's Messiah, Handel's Zadok the Priest, Fauré's Requiem, Verdi's Requiem, and Henry Purcell's hymns, or Broadway musicals, though the programme may be chosen to coincide with a festival or other special occasion or time of year or day (e.g. Evensong, Nine Lessons and Carols).

A come-and-sing event can serve recruitment purposes, in that the visiting singers can learn what it is like to sing in the standing chorus of the presiding conductor, who in turn may be able to recruit able singers for his/her group.

A come-and-sing event can also help create a bond between a professional chorus and its audience. For instance, the Los Angeles Master Chorale annually invites its audience to participate in a performance of Handel's Messiah, seated in the audience section of their auditorium (Walt Disney Concert Hall) and led by their music director (Grant Gershon).

== See also ==
- Sing-along
