= Hermann Suter =

Swiss composer and conductor

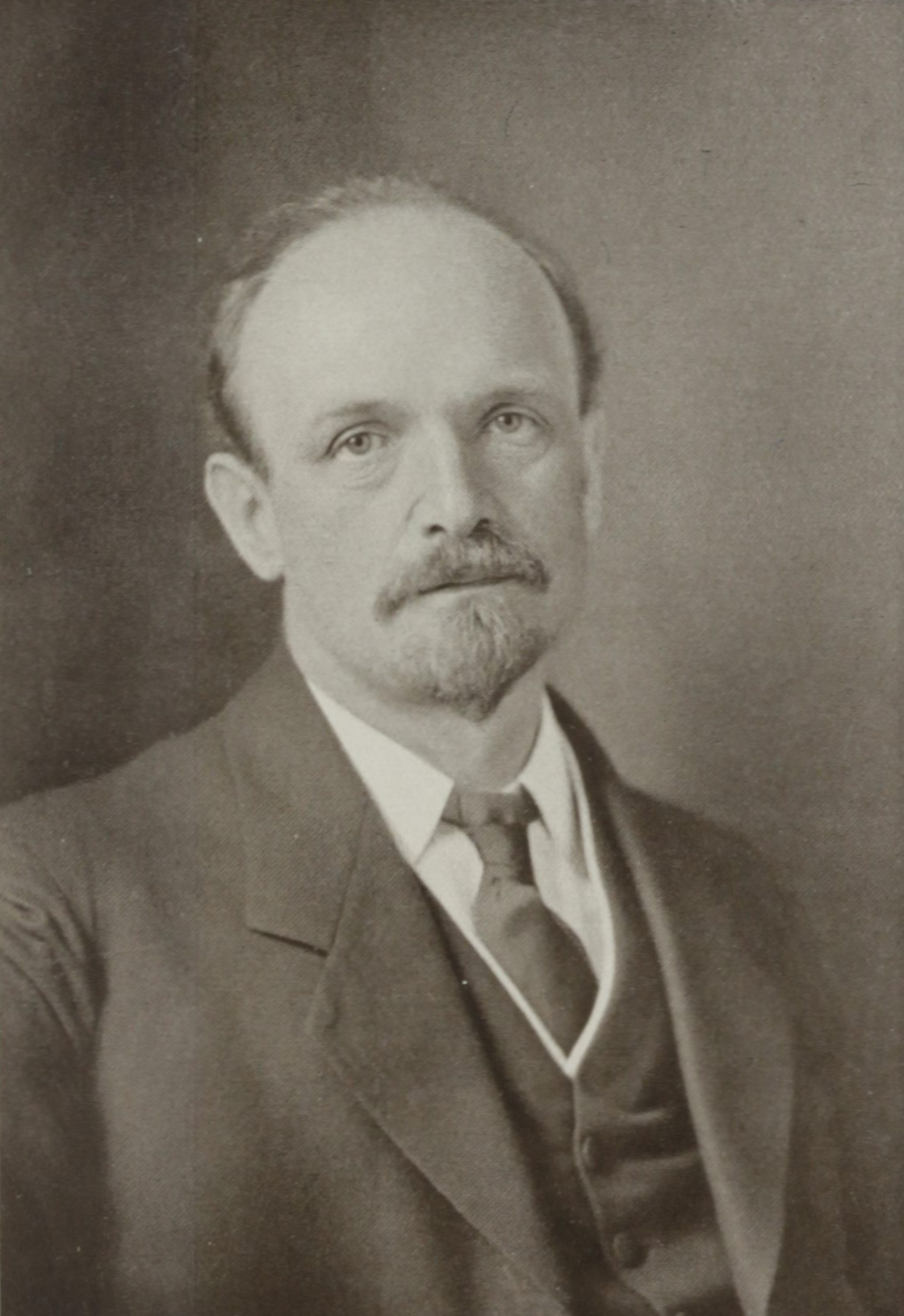
Hermann Suter (1870–1926)

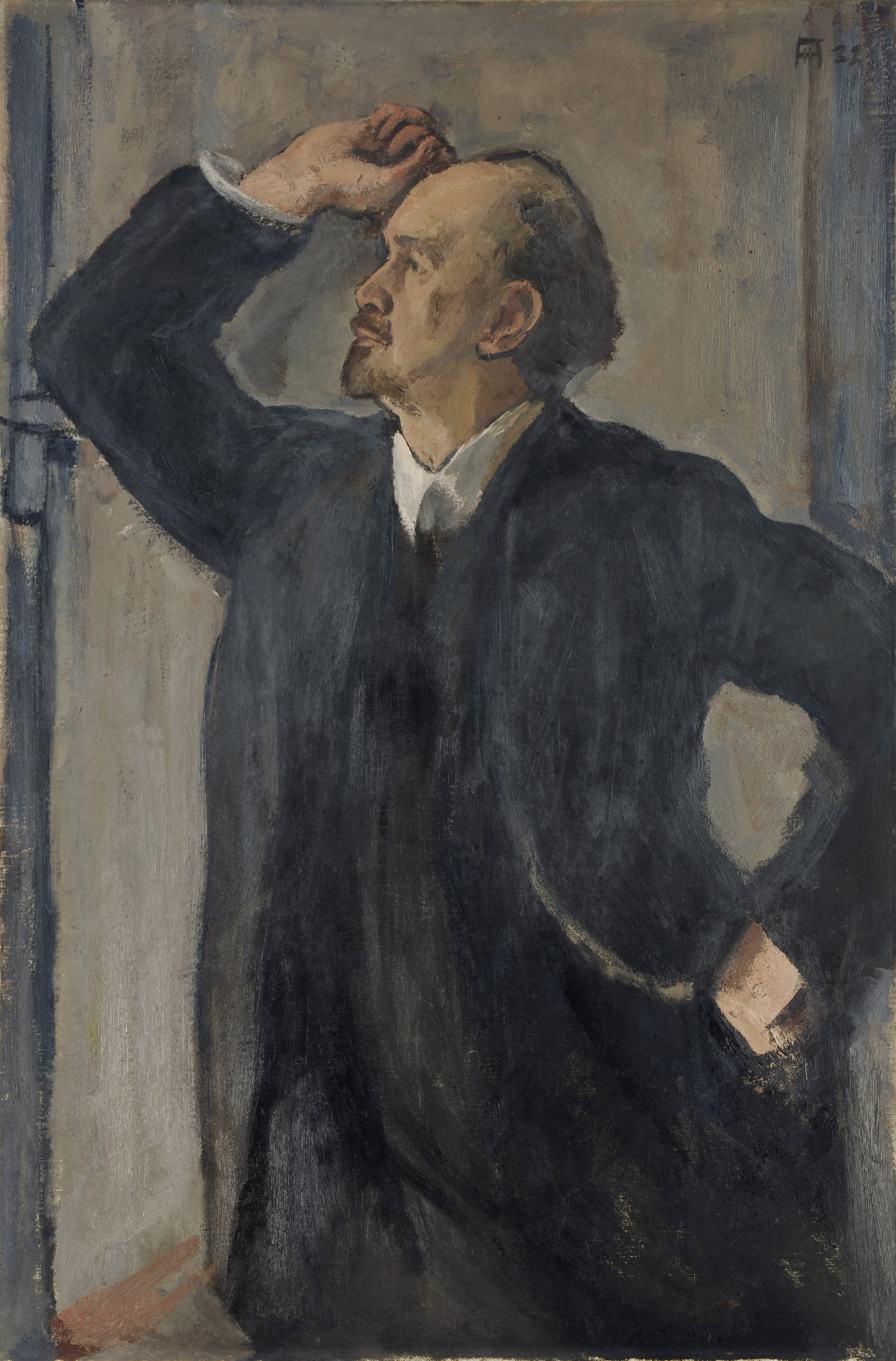
Portrait of Hermann Suter, by Heinrich Altherr, 1922

Hermann Suter (28 April 1870 – 22 June 1926) was a Swiss composer and conductor.

== Biography ==
Born in Kaiserstuhl, Aargau, Suter studied in the conservatories at Basel, Stuttgart and Leipzig, under Hans Huber and Carl Reinecke. He was an organist and conductor in Zurich from 1892 to 1902, after which he moved to Basel, where he lived to his death. He was director of the Basel Conservatory from 1918 to 1921. One of his pupils at Basel was Richard Tauber who sang three of his songs at the Olten Music Festival in June 1912.

== Compositions ==
Suter's compositions contain echoes of Brahms, Strauss, Mahler, and many other composers whom Suter conducted at Basel. Much of his output is for chorus, both accompanied and unaccompanied; the best-known of his works is the oratorio Le Laudi (The Praises) or Le Laudi di San Francesco d'Assisi, based on the Canticle of the Sun, written in the summer of 1923 in Plaun da Lej, in Engadine, and premiered on 13 June 1924 in Basel. By 1930 the oratorio had been performed over eighty times in nearly as many cities. Wilhelm Furtwängler led the Vienna premiere, and the work was acclaimed in Paris, Stockholm, Berlin, Hamburg, Leipzig, Cologne, and a host of smaller German cities. Other compositions include a symphony (1914), a violin concerto (1921), three string quartets (1901, 1910, 1921), a sextet for strings (1920), and numerous songs.

- The first US performance of Le Laudi may have been in 1930 at St. Mark's Church, New York City.
- The first professional performance of Le Laudi in the US was in June, 2000, at the Neal S. Blaisdell Center, Honolulu.
- The American Symphony Orchestra gave the US Premiere of Suter's Violin Concerto, Op. 23 in 2008.
- The UK premiere of Le Laudi took place in Cambridge on 21 June 2009.
