= Aberdeen Bach Choir =

Aberdeen Bach Choir is a choir with members from Aberdeen, Scotland. Membership is open to anyone, aged 15 or over, who is able to fulfil the Choir's reason for existence, i.e. to perform Choral works. All members must be able to sing accurately and in tune, with a secure sense of rhythm.

== About ==
Founded with the influence of the distinguished Bach scholar Charles Sanford Terry (historian) and direction of Warren T Clemens in 1913 as the Aberdeen Bach Society, it was reconstituted as Aberdeen Bach Choir in 1956. Starting initially with 12 members, it has now grown to between 90 and 100.

Aberdeen Bach Choir (Scottish Registered Charity SC008609), based in the city of Aberdeen, Scotland performs the music not only of Johann Sebastian Bach (1685–1750), but also a wide variety of choral music from the 17th to the 21st century.

The choir currently performs two main recitals a year in St Machar's Cathedral in Old Aberdeen. It has also performed in recent years at Brechin Arts Festival, Greyfriars Kirk in Edinburgh and in London.

Aberdeen Bach Choir is affiliated to Making Music Scotland.

== Conductors ==
Willian Swainson 1956–1957

John B. Dalby 1957–1960

Graham R. Wiseman 1960–1967

David Murray 1967–1969

James G. Lobban 1969–2006

Gordon Jack 2006–2010

Peter Parfitt 2010-2022

Paul Tierney 2022 -

== Concerts ==
Concerts are usually held on Sunday evening in St Machar's Cathedral. They are often accompanied by the Aberdeen Sinfonetta orchestra and professional soloists are brought in for the main concerts.

== The Chronicle of St Machar ==
In January 1998, an application for funding from the National Lottery to commission a new work was accepted. The Chronicle of Saint Machar, a piece for orchestra and two choirs, which was based on the life of St. Machar, was composed by the renowned Scottish composer, John McLeod (composer).

The piece is an evocative work which combines adult and children choirs, along with orchestra and a range of percussion which includes bells and a Saab car spring.

The first performance took place in the cathedral bearing the saint's name, St Machar's Cathedral, Aberdeen on 25 April 1999, (reviewed by James Allan; The Scotsman; 26 April 1999), followed by a second performance at the same venue on 6 June 1999. With further 'Awards for All' funding from the Scottish Arts Council lottery fund, a third performance took place on 28 October 2000 at Greyfriars Kirk, Edinburgh (reviewed by Conrad Wilson; The Herald (Glasgow); 10/2000).

To celebrate the 250th anniversary of the birth of Robert Burns and Homecoming Scotland 2009, a fourth performance took place on 6 December 2009 in St Machar's Cathedral, along with the first performance of another specially commissioned work, funded from the James Lobban Bequest, Love is like the Melody by the Scottish composer Ken Johnston.
