= Berner Bach-Chor =

The Berner Bach-Chor is a Swiss choir based in Bern. It is "a dynamic choir with one concert activity; a choir, openly for unusual, unknown and contemporary; a choir with international radiant emittance; an inspired community of approximately 120 singers; a choir, which was distinguished for its qualitatively high standing of work in 1997 with the culture prize of the Bürgergemeinde Bern."

The choir was founded by Theo Loosli, and is currently being conducted by Lena-Lisa Wüstendörfer.
