= Te Deum (Reulein) =

Te Deum setting for choir and orchestra, 2018

- Sacred choral music by Peter Reulein
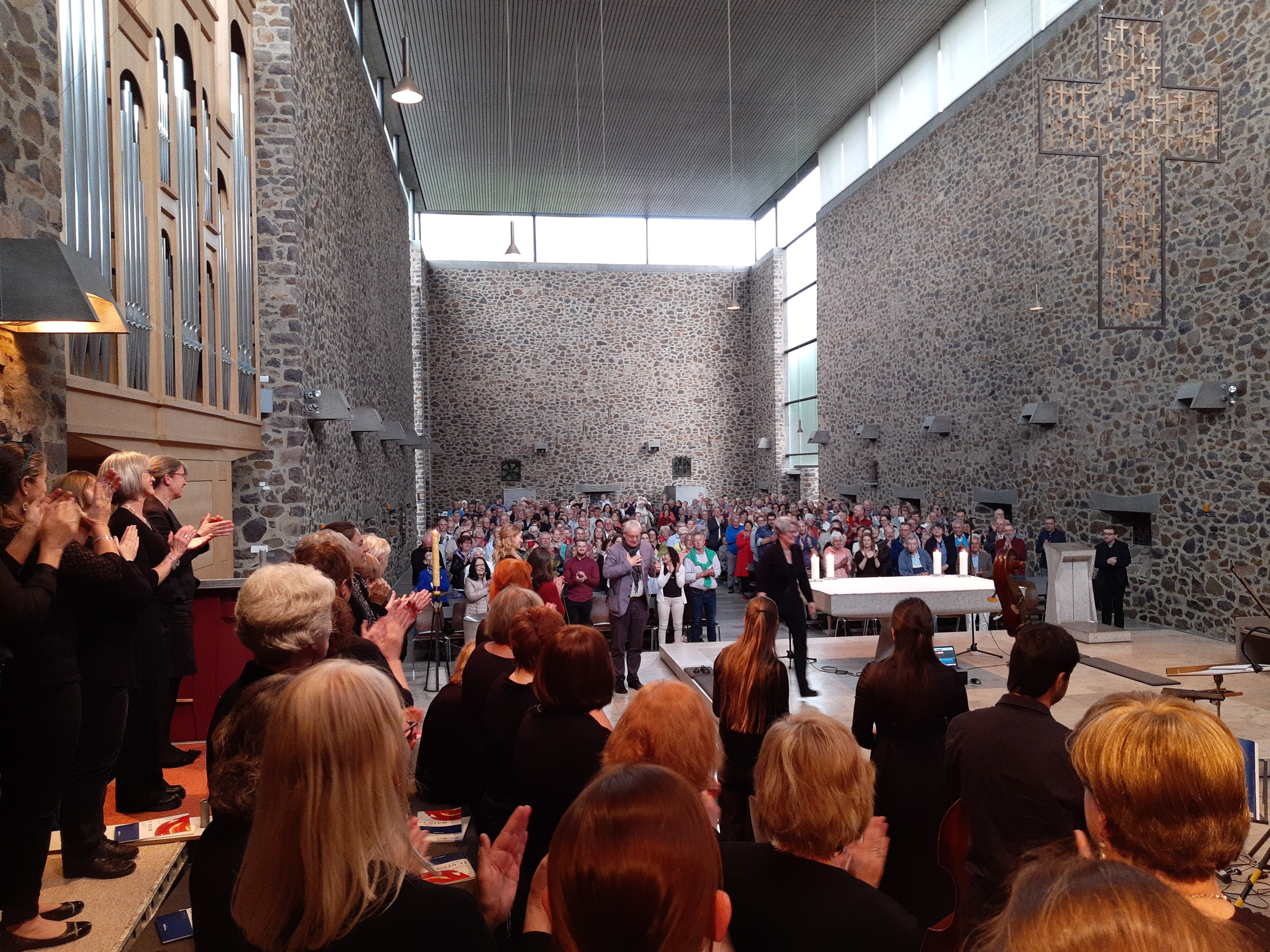
- Reulein in 2023, thanking performers after a concert sung by four choirs in St. Martin, Idstein
- Text: Te Deum; poem in German
- Language: Latin; German
- Published: 2018
- Movements: four
- Vocal: SATB choir
- Instrumental: bandoneon; piano; strings

Peter Reulein's Te Deum is a choral composition completed in 2018, a setting of the Te Deum. It is scored like Palmeri's Misatango, for four-part choir (SATB), bandoneon, piano and strings; it also uses Latin-American dance rhythms.

== History ==
Te Deum was written by Peter Reulein, the director of music at Liebfrauen, Frankfurt, since 2000. On a specific commission from Leichlingen, he wrote it as a possible companion piece to the popular Misa a Buenos Aires (Misatango), a 1996 mass composition by the Argentinian composer Martin Palmeri. Reulein used the same scoring for four-part choir (SATB), bandoneon, piano and strings, and also employed Latin-American dance rhythms, tango, habanera and huapango. Reulein added percussion instruments to the scoring.

The work was published by the Dehm Verlag in 2018. The world premiere was given on 29 April 2018, coupled with Palmerí's Misatango, in an ecumenical choral concert in the church St. Johannes Baptist in Leichlingen, sung by the Protestant chorale, the Catholic church choir and an Italian choir, Ludus Vocalis from Ravenna. The Italian choir performed the Italian premiere at the Basilica di San Francesco in Ravenna in a Christmas concert on 26 December 2018, conducted by Stefano Sintoni.

== Music ==
The composition is structured in four movements:

1. Te Deum laudamus
2. Te gloriosis Apostelarum
3. Tu, Rex gloriae, Christe
4. Salvum fac populum tuum, Domine

The first movement begins with a quotation of the Gregorian melody of the Te Deum in the bandoneon. The hymn of praise "Te Deum laudamus" (We praise Thee, oh Lord) is set in Tango rhythm.

The second movement contains the praise of apostles and martyrs. It is interpreted as a canon in the rhythm of the African-Cuban habanera, a precursor of the tango.

In the third movement, Christ is praised, "Tu Rex gloria, Christe" (Christ, you King of glory). It is set in the rhythm of the Mexican huapango with a characteristic alternation between measures with three times two eighth-notes, and two times three eighth-notes. The opening line returns several times as a ritornello.

The forth movement collects prayers for mercy and salvation, "Salvum fac populum tuum, Domine" (Make your people whole, Lord), ending with the line "In te, Domine, speravi" (For you, Lord, I hope). The prayers are intensified by the hymn in German "Gott, wir sind deine Kinder" (God, we are your children), Its four stanzas, with the melody in different voices, are followed by a recapitulation of the beginning, Te Deum.
