= Jesus Christus, Sohn des Lebens =

Christian hymn

- Christian hymn
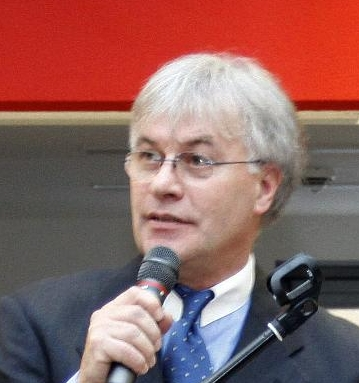
- Eugen Eckert in 2008
- English: Jesus Christ, son of life
- Text: by Eugen Eckert
- Language: German
- Melody: by Peter Reulein

"Jesus Christus, Sohn des Lebens" ("Jesus Christ, son of life") is a Christian hymn of the genre Neues Geistliches Lied by Eugen Eckert, with a melody by Peter Reulein. The song is an extended paraphrase of the Agnus Dei. It is part of hymnals and songbooks.

== History ==
"Jesus Christus, Sohn des Lebens" was written by the Protestant theologian and minister Eugen Eckert from Frankfurt, who has taken care of students, the football arena, and persons outcast by society. The song addresses Jesus three times, in three stanzas ending in a refrain "Du Lamm Gottes" (You, Lamb of God), which in a paraphrase of the Agnus Dei prays for mercy in two stanzas, and finally for peace. It can be used as song for Agnus Dei in the mass.

The melody was composed by Peter Reulein, the church musician at Liebfrauen, Frankfurt. The melody is in D major, and renders the many calls to Jesus in short phrases of a narrow tonal range. Intentionally simple, it flows mostly in eighth notes, with only few syllables as broader quarters. Thus, the beginning of the refrain stands out by four consecutive quarters.

The song is part of regional sections of the German common Catholic hymnal Gotteslob of 2013, for example in the Diocese of Limburg as GL 739. It is part of other hymnals and songbooks.
