= Laudato si' (oratorio) =

2016 oratorio by Peter Reulein and Helmut Schlegel

- Ein franziskanisches Magnificat
- Oratorio by Peter Reulein
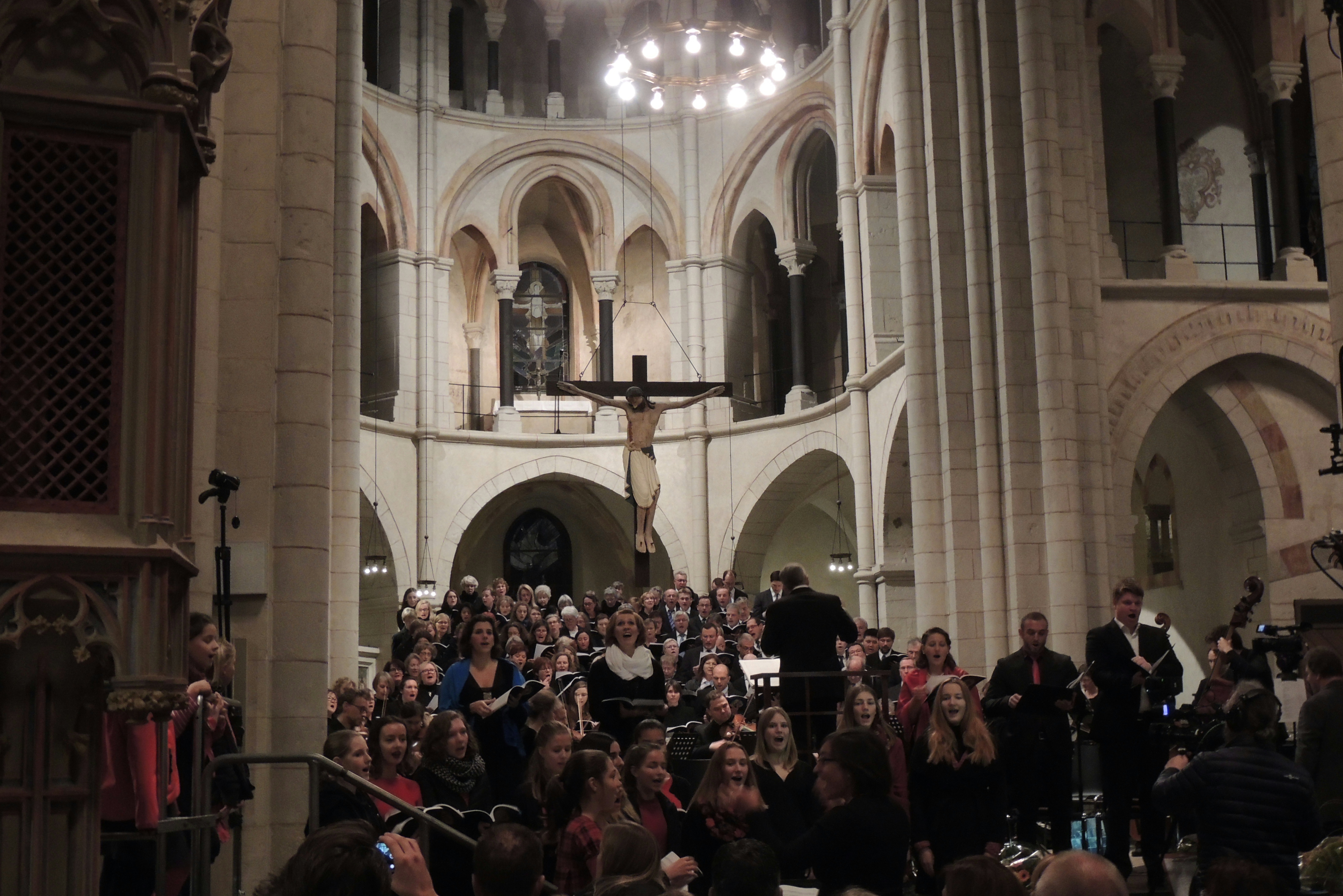
- Premiere at the Limburg Cathedral on 6 November 2016
- Text: Helmut Schlegel
- Language: German; Latin; Italian; Hebrew
- Based on: Magnificat
- Performed: 6 November 2016
- Published: 2016 Dehm Verlag
- Scoring: two sopranos; alto; tenor; bass; Choralschola; children's choir; mixed choir; orchestra; organ

Laudato si' is an oratorio composed in 2016 by Peter Reulein on a libretto by Helmut Schlegel. Subtitled Ein franziskanisches Magnificat (a Franciscan Magnificat), it includes the full Latin text of the Magnificat, expanded by writings of Clare of Assisi, Francis of Assisi and Pope Francis. The composer set it for five soloists, children's choir, Choralschola, mixed choir, symphony orchestra and organ. It was published in 2016 by the Dehm Verlag, and was premiered on 6 November 2016 at the Limburg Cathedral, conducted by the composer.

== History ==
The work was commissioned by the Referat Kirchenmusik im Bistum Limburg (RKM), the division of church music of the Diocese of Limburg, to celebrate the organization's 50th anniversary. The work was requested to include many different musical groups and styles, to represent the activities of the church musicians in the diocese, such as Gregorian chant, choral singing of children and adults, organ solo music, and Neues Geistliches Lied. The text was planned to contain writings by Pope Francis from his Apostolic exhortation Evangelii gaudium (2013) and his encyclical Laudato si' (2015), and the Magnificat in the traditional Latin. The librettist, the Franciscan Helmut Schlegel, introduced additional writings by Francis of Assisi and Clare of Assisi, and focused on mercy corresponding to the Extraordinary Jubilee of Mercy in 2016. Peter Reulein was commissioned to compose the music. The oratorio was published in 2016 by the Dehm Verlag. The composer conducted the premiere in a concert at the Limburg Cathedral on 6 November 2016.

== Structure ==
The work is structured in a prologue and five scenes:

- Prologue: Erfüllt ist die Zeit (Time is fulfilled)
- Scene 1: Die Schöpfung tanzt – die Schöpfung klagt (Creation dances – Creation mourns)
- Scene 2: Gottes Neubeginn (God's new beginning)
- Scene 3: Er gab dir Atem, gab dir Würde (He gave you breath, gave you dignity)
- Scene 4: Das Leben feiert Aufstand (Life celebrates uproar)
- Scene 5: Ein jeder Augenblick ist Anfang (Every moment is beginning)

=== Table ===
In the following table, the characters are abbreviated, and background colours highlight the text of the Magnificat (green), texts in Italian (brown), and texts in Hebrew (blue).

Movements of Laudato si'
Scene	Title	Angel	Mary	Clare	Francis	Pope	Choir	Schola	Marking	Source
Prologue	Als die Zeit erfüllt war	A					Ch	Sch	Lento misterioso	
1	Laudato si' mi Signore			C	F	P	Children Ch		Allegro grazioso (Tarantella)	
1	Dies irae							Sch	Allegro con fuoco	
1	In Klage und Trauer schauen wir zurück					P			Adagio (Tango de la lamentacion)	
1	Aufbrechen wollen wir, nicht klagen						Ch		Lento con decisione	
2	Der Engel war's	A	M						Moderato e dolce	
2	Et verbum caro factum est							Sch	Lento	
2	Magnificat anima mea		M				Ch		Allegro festivo	Luke 1:46-47
2	Quia respexit humiltatem		M						Lento	Luke 1:48
2	Ecce enim ex hoc beatam		M				Ch		Lento	Luke 1:48
2	Glauben können wie du						Ch		Moderato cantabile	
3	Es war in Kana		M						Misterioso	
3	Shalom alechem						Children Ch		Allegro (Klezmer)	
3	Seht, unentbehrlich ist das weibliche Talent					P	Ch		Un poco lento quasi recitativo	
3	Du, Gott, hast mir gesagt	A	M						Con moto	
3	Quia fecit mihi magna		M				Ch		Andante con moto	Luke 1:49
3	Et misericordia		M				Ch		Andante cantabile	Luke 1:50
4	Stabat Mater							SchM	Lent	
4	Wir standen beide unterm Kreuz		M						Lamentoso e pesante	
4	Hört Gottes Ruf					P			Recitativo	
4	Fecit potentiam						Ch		Allegro con fuoco	Luke 1:51
4	Du Mensch, gedenke			C	F				Lento recitativo	
4	Deposuit potentes						Ch		Allegro con brio	Luke 1:52
4	Am andern Tag der neuen Woche		M						Lento recitativo	
4	Et exaltavit humiles						Ch		Andante maestoso	
4	Esurientes		M				Ch		Andante maestoso	Luke 1:53
4	Suscepit Israel							Sch	Meno mosso	Luke 1:53
4	Halleluja	A	M	C	F	P	Children Ch		Allegro (African song call and response	
5	Sicut locutus est							Sch	Quasi recitativo	Luke 1:53
5	Gott, du bist heilig					P			Andante grazioso (Tango de la confidencia)	
5	Du bist die Freude			C	F	P			Andante grazioso (Tango de la confidencia)	
5	Gloria Patri						Ch		Allegro festivo	Doxology
5	Ein jeder Tag						Children Ch		Hymnus	
5	Amen, Halleluja						Ch		Andante cantabile in stile barocco	
5	Laudato si'	A	M	C	F	P	Children Ch		Andante cantabile in stile barocco	

=== Scenes ===
Different actions comment on the verses of the Magnificat. The prologue introduces an angel announcing that God sent his Son when the time was fulfilled, the Choralschola emphasizes that the Son shows God's face of mercy, and the choir concludes that the time is fulfilled.

Scene 1 introduces Clare and Francis of Assisi singing "Laudato si'" in tarantella rhythm, ultimately joined by the choirs. The schola intones the Dies irae expanded by Pope Francis, singing of the saddening situation of the environment caused by humans, in an Adagio. Tango de la lamentacion to honour the Pope's home country. The scene ends with the Neues Geistliches Lied "Aufbrechen wollen wir, nicht klagen."

In scene 2, Mary tells of her experience of the Annunciation and begins the Magnificat, joined by the choirs. The scene is concluded with the 2009 song "Glauben können wie du" by Schlegel with a melody by Joachim Raabe (GL 885 in the regional part for Limburg).

Scene 3 is focused on the Marriage at Cana, portrayed in Klezmer music. Pope Francis stresses the importance of the female voice in society and church. Mary sings "Et misericordia eius" (And his mercy), now from the Magnificat, joined by the choir.

Scene 4 opens with the schola singing Stabat Mater, facing the Crucifixion. Pope Francis connects in recitative to drama of 2016, such as poverty, wars, and refugees, and forced prostitution. The verses from the Magnificat that focus on God's strong arm creating justice are given to choral fugues, interrupted by Clare and Francis reminding the listener to reflect who he is. The children open Halleluja as an African call and response, joined by all soloists and the mixed choir.

Scene 5 opens with the schola singing the final line from the Magnificat, "Sicut locutus est" (As was spoken), to which Francis, the Pope, and Clare respond with a Tango de confidencia praising God. The choir answers with the doxology "Gloria Patri" which recalls motifs from earlier scenes. A new element is a third song, "Ein jeder Tag und Augenblick ist Neuland," with the audience joining the singing. The work is concluded with a double fugue in stile barocco on Amen/Halleluja.

=== Scoring ===
The oratorio is scored for five solo voices representing characters, children's choir, Choralschola, a large mixed choir divided in up to eight parts, a symphony orchestra, and organ.

The characters are:

- Angel (soprano)
- Maria (soprano)
- Clare of Assisi (alto)
- Francis of Assisi (tenor)
- Pope Francis (baritone)

The orchestra features flute (also playing descant recorder), clarinet, oboe, bassoon, two trumpets, two horns, trombone, tuba (ad lib.), timpani, percussion (including tambourine, drums, suspended cymbal, triangle, chimes, tuned glasses, marimba, djembé, glockenspiel), harp and strings.

== Premiere and reception ==
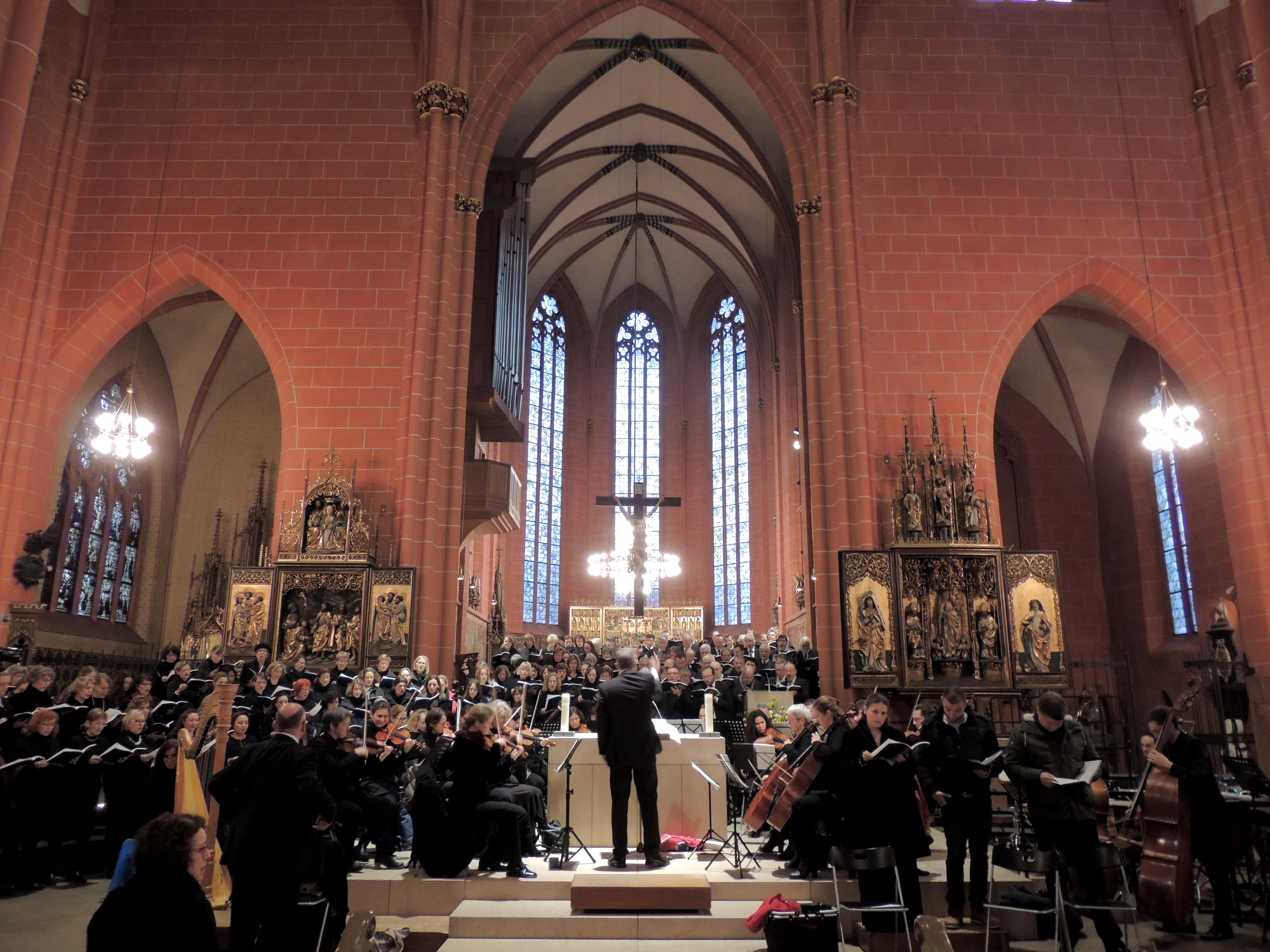
The same performers reprised the work at the Frankfurt Cathedral on 29 January 2017.

In the premiere, the children's and youth choir was from Maria Rosenkranz, conducted by Karin Mayle-Polivka. The mixed choir combined four groups, two from the composer's Liebfrauen, Frankfurt, vocal ensemble and the youth choir Cappuccinis, and two from St. Martin, Idstein, Chor St. Martin and the youth choir Martinis. The Schola was formed by singers from groups in the diocese, conducted by Franz Fink, and sang from the organ loft at the back of the cathedral. often introduced and accompanied by the organ. The orchestra for the occasion was the ensemble colorito, and the cathedral organ was played by Johannes Schröder, then organist at the Westerwälder Dom. The soloists were sopranos Marina Herrmann (Mary) and Janina Moeller (Angel), mezzo-soprano Anna Metzen (Clare of Assisi), tenor André Khamasmie (Francis of Assisi) and baritone Johannes Hill (Pope Francis). More than 250 musical performers contributed to the premiere.

A reviewer of the Nassauische Neue Presse noted the successful premiere, describing the work as a musical collage of biblical verses, action and meditative impulses ("musikalische Collage mit Bibelversen, erzählerischen Elementen, und meditativen Impulsen"). The reviewer, who listed the many performers and commented on several scenes, called the final hymnus a message of peace and joy.
