= Peter Reulein =

German composer (born 1966)

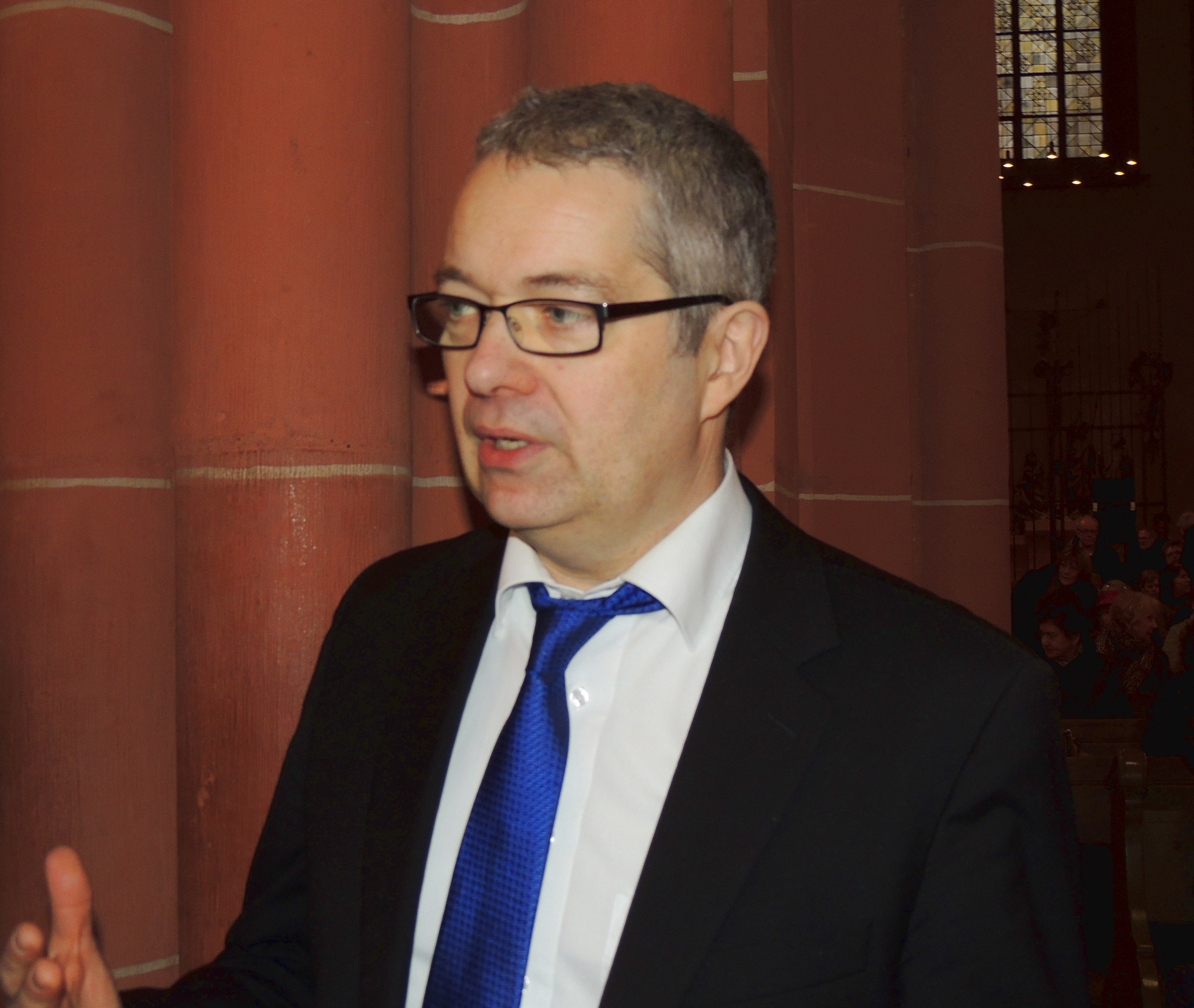
- Reulein in 2017, conducting his oratorio Laudato si' at the Frankfurt Cathedral
- Born: 1966 (age 59–60); Frankfurt am Main
- Education: Hochschule für Musik und Darstellende Kunst Frankfurt am Main
- Occupations: Choral conductor; Organist; Composer; Academic teacher
- Organizations: Liebfrauen, Frankfurt

Peter Reulein (born 1966) is a German composer, organ improviser, academic teacher and church musician, from 2000 at the church Liebfrauen in Frankfurt am Main. In 2016 he composed for the Catholic Diocese of Limburg the Franciscan oratorio Laudato si'.

== Career ==
Born in Frankfurt am Main, Reulein studied Catholic church music at the Hochschule für Musik und Darstellende Kunst Frankfurt am Main with Wolfgang Schäfer and Uwe Gronostay. After extended studies of organ improvisation with Daniel Roth in Paris, he won several national and international competitions in this field, for example in 1993 the competition of Belgian radio and the second prize and the public's prize at the Festival Europäische Kirchenmusik in Schwäbisch Gmünd. He continued his studies of interpretations with Ludger Lohmann, Ewald Kooiman and Wolfgang Rübsam. He took master classes with choral conductors such as Eric Ericson and Helmuth Rilling.

From 1991, Reulein was the church musician at the Heilig Geist in Frankfurt-Riederwald, from 2000 he has held the position at Liebfrauen in the centre of Frankfurt. There he directs a vocal ensemble, the choir Collegium Vocale, the orchestra Collegium Musicum and the youth choir Capuccinis. He was instrumental in having a new organ built which Karl Göckel completed in 2008. Reulein inaugurated it in a concert on 9 August, playing works by Bach, César Franck and improvisation.

Reulein is known for composing new songs for church services (Neues Geistliches Lied), many of them on texts by Eugen Eckert. Reulein was from 2000 until 2005 the head of the Arbeitskreis Kirchenmusik und Jugendseelsorge im Bistum Limburg, caring about more appropriate church music for young people. Reulein has been an instructor of liturgical organ playing and improvisation at the Frankfurt Hochschule für Musik und Darstellende Kunst from 2002. He was appointed Bezirkskantor (regional cantor) for Frankfurt in 2008.

In 2014, Reulein recorded at Liebfrauen a CD of Französische Orgelsymphonik (French symphonic organ music) with works by Léon Boëllmann, Camille Saint-Saëns, Alexandre Guilmant and Charles-Marie Widor.

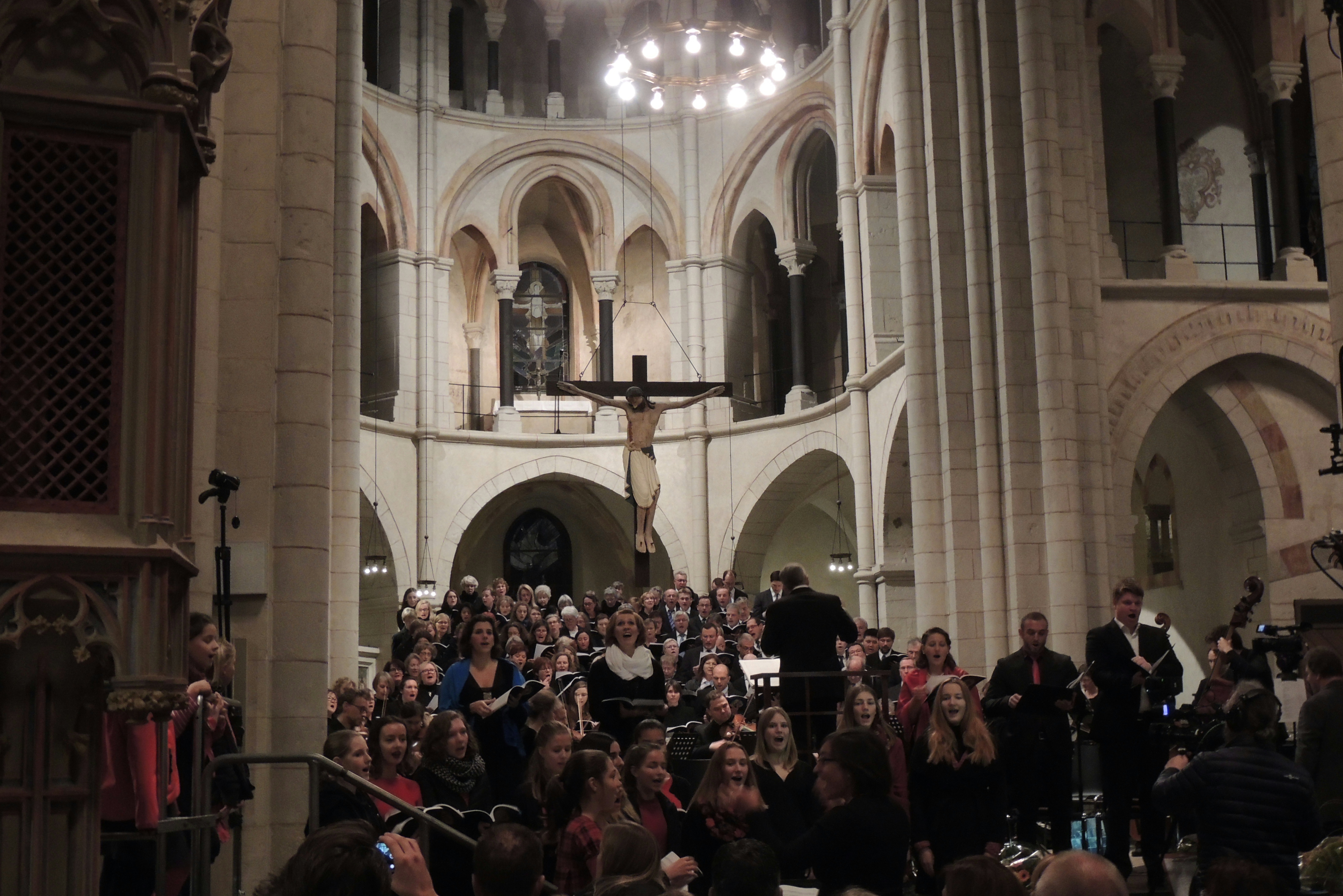
Premiere of Laudato si' on 6 November 2016 at the Limburg Cathedral, conducted by the composer

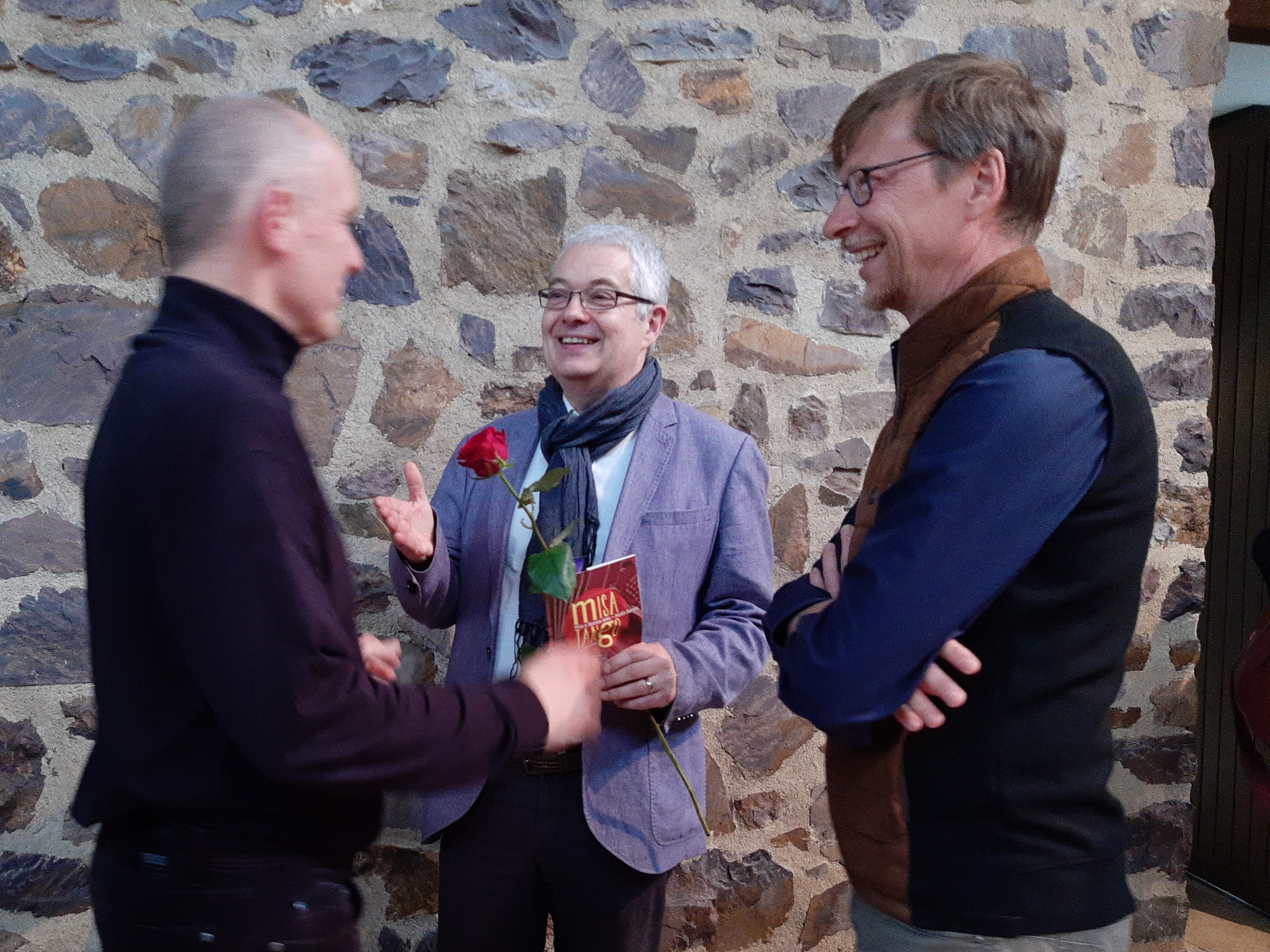
Reulein (centre), talking after a performance of his Te Deum at St. Martin, Idstein, to Franz Fink (left) who conducted and Roman Twardy on 7 May 2023

He was commissioned to compose an oratorio to celebrate in 2016 the 50th anniversary of church music in the Catholic Diocese of Limburg, presenting different styles of church music. The text by Helmut Schlegel, titled Laudato si' – Ein franziskanisches Magnificat (A Franciscan Magnificat) includes the Latin Magnificat, writings by Francis of Assisi and Clare of Assisi, writings by Pope Francis from the German version of Laudato si' to German, and other sacred texts. Reulein scored the work for five soloists, children's choir, Choralschola, mixed choir, organ and orchestra. It was published by the Dehm-Verlag in Limburg in 2016 and first performed in the Limburg Cathedral on 6 November 2016, conducted by the composer.

== Works ==
- "Wir haben seinen Stern gesehen", text: Eugen Eckert
- "Dich will ich loben allezeit", 1994, text: Eckert
- "Laß dich anstecken zum Jubel", 1994, text: Eckert
- "Jesus Christus, Sohn des Lebens", 1994, text: Eckert
- "Gott, dein guter Geist", 1994, text: Eckert
- "Heilig, heilig, Hosanna guter Gott", 1994
- "Dich, Gott, will ich erheben", 1999, text: Eckert
- "Dir, Gott, du unsere Stärke", 1999, text: Eckert
- "Was sagst du, Gott, zu dieser Welt?", 1999, Text: Eckert
- "Jesus, Gottes Lamm", 1999, text: Eckert
- "Die Zeit färben", 1999, text: Eckert
- "Seht, Brot und Wein", 1999, text: Eckert
- "Ich lasse dich nicht", text: Eckert, for a song competition of the Ökumenischer Kirchentag 2003 in Berlin
- "Vereinigungslied der Deutschen Kapuziner", text: Bernhard Philipp, 2010
- Schlegel, Helmut (2016). Laudato si' – Ein franziskanisches Magnificat. Limburg: Dehm-Verlag. ISBN 978-3-943302-34-9.
- Te Deum, for choir, bandoneon, piano, strings and percussion, 2018
- Eins, oratorio, 2021 for the Ökumenischer Kirchentag 2021 in Frankfurt
