= Limburg Cathedral =

- St George's Cathedral, Limburg
- Limburger Dom; Georgsdom
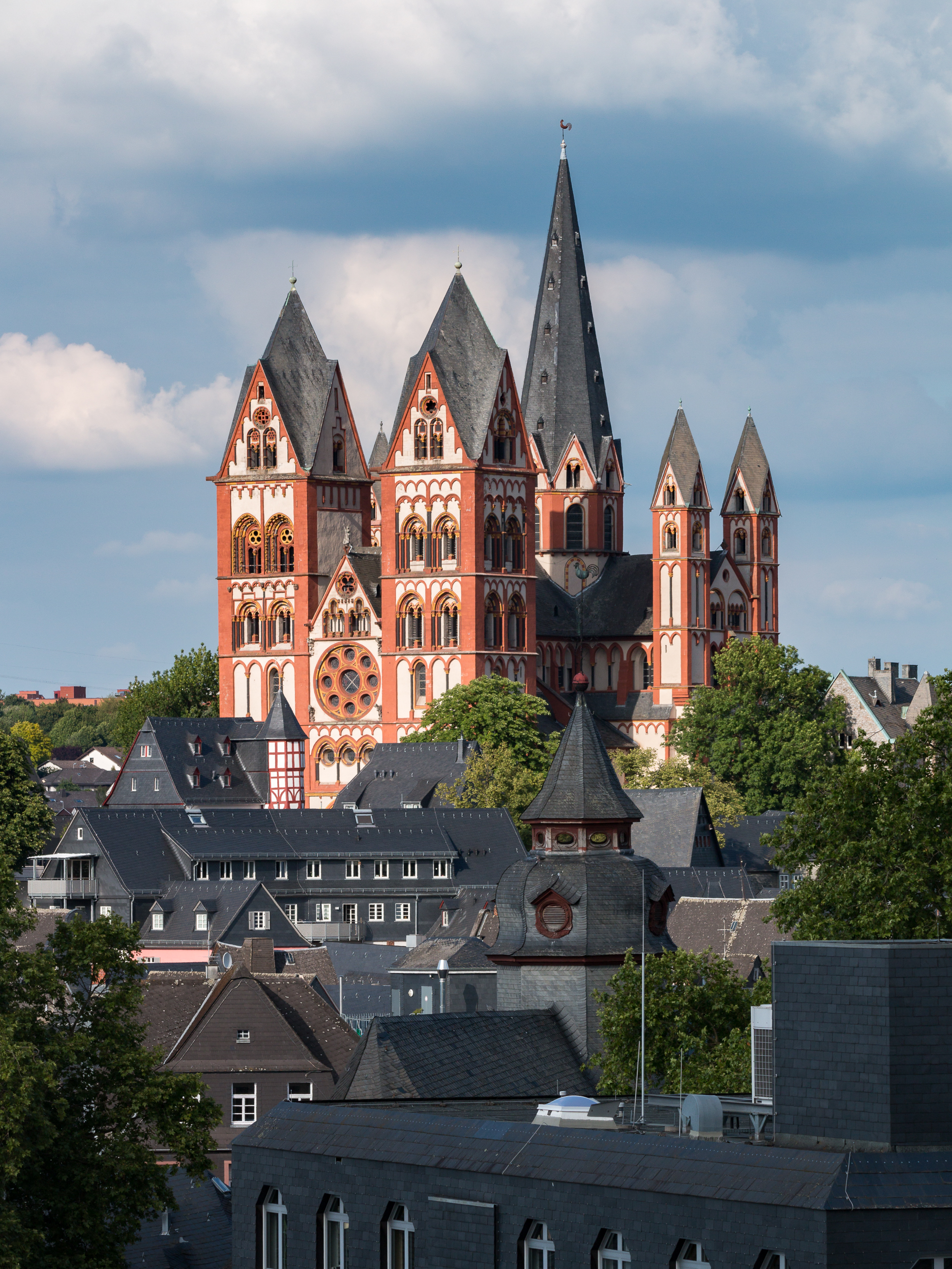
- The cathedral towering over the city
- Limburg Cathedral
- 50°23′20″N 8°04′02″E
- Location: Limburg
- Country: Germany
- Denomination: Catholic
- Website: dom.bistumlimburg.de

History
- Status: Active
- Founded: 910, 11th century, c. 1180
- Consecrated: 1235

Architecture
- Functional status: Cathedral
- Architectural type: basilica
- Style: "First Gothic"

Specifications
- Length: 54 m (177 ft 2 in)
- Width: 35 m (114 ft 10 in)
- Height: 66 m (216 ft 6 in)

Administration
- Province: Province of Cologne
- Archdiocese: Archdiocese of Cologne
- Diocese: Diocese of Limburg

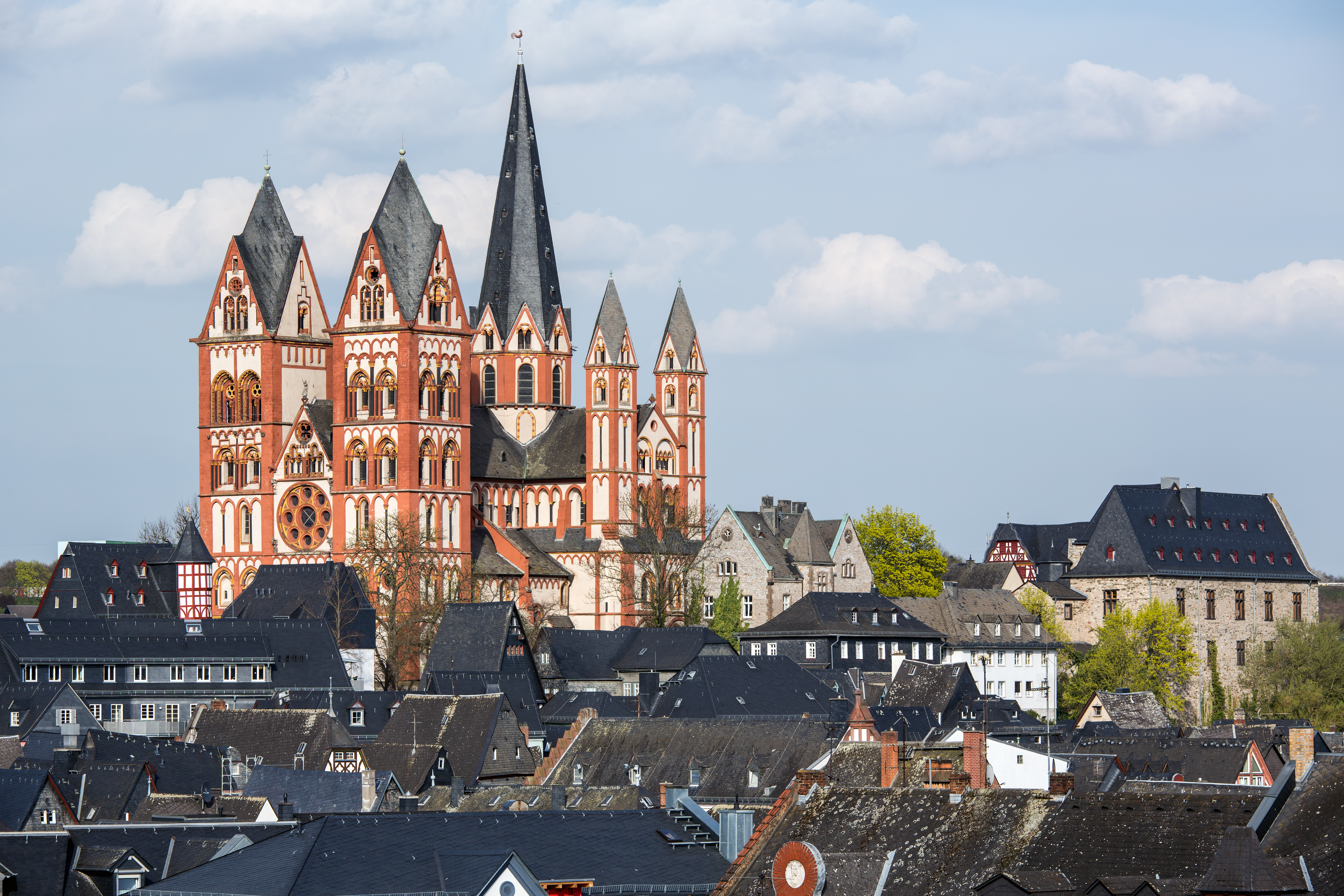
Limburg Cathedral and old town in spring 2014

Limburg Cathedral (German: Limburger Dom), also known as Georgsdom ("George's Cathedral") after its dedication to Saint George, is located above the old town of Limburg in Hesse, Germany. It is the cathedral of the Catholic Diocese of Limburg. Its high location on a rock above the river Lahn provides its visibility from far away. It is the result of an Early Gothic modernisation of an originally Early Romanesque building, and therefore shows a Romanesque-Gothic transitional style.

The medieval patron saints of the church were Saint George and Saint Nicholas.

== History ==
When the first church was built above the Lahn on the Limburger Felsen ("Limburg Rock") is not exactly known. According to a reference in the Nekrolog of the Basilica of St. Castor in Koblenz, Archbishop Hetti of Trier (814–847) consecrated a church of Saint George in "Lympurgensis".

Incidental archaeological discoveries from Carolingian times under the current church support the existence of a 9th-century church building in the area of the present chapel. There are no actual remains of the building, however, nor any indications of its exact location or of its patron saint. Since the aforementioned record of its consecration was first written down in the 16th century, its accuracy has been controversial in scholarly literature.

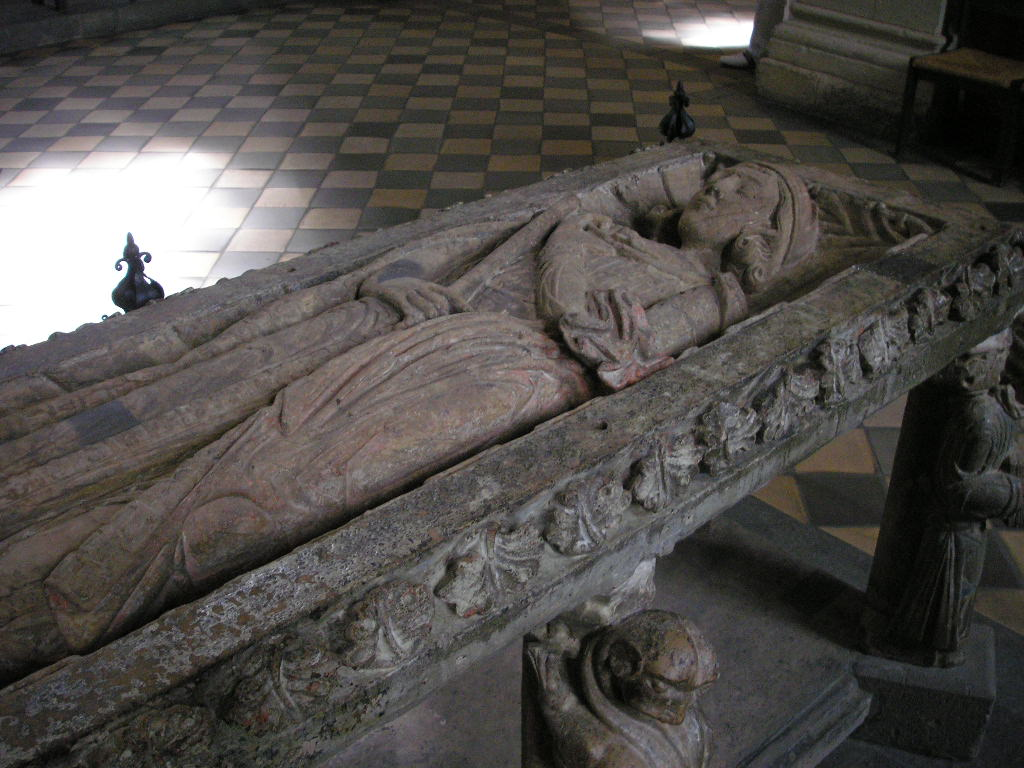
Table tomb of Konrad Kurzbold, now in the northern transept

On 10 February 910, King Louis the Child issued a deed for the foundation of a Stift of canons, which the Gaugraf of Niederlahngau, Konrad Kurzbold (~ 885–948) had pushed for. The construction of a collegiate church probably began immediately. The choice of Saint George as patron is mentioned by Emperor Otto I in a document from the year 940. By then, the first church had very likely already been completed.

In the 11th century, that first church was replaced by an Early Romanesque basilica. A lead reliquary from the 11th century, found in 1776 in the main altar in the form of a schematic model of a church, mentions a Graf (count) Heinrich as founder and builder of a new "templum", that being apparently the new basilica.

Around 1180, an extensive remodelling had begun that gave the church its present-day shape. In the western part, the nave and the transept, and the walls up to the top of the level of the galleries, are remnants of the Early Romanesque basilica. The Gothic modernisation had started in the west and proceeded eastward. Most of the windows and the western portal were vertically elongated in Gothic style, but the vaults of the aisles of the nave are still of Romanesque type. Relics of the Romanesque walls of the choir, including a bank of stone, can be seen below the arcades around the choir. The outer walls of the ambulatory are originally Gothic, and so are the vaults of the ambulatory. Many details inside the church suggest that the builders followed the example of Laon Cathedral, the construction of which had been started one or two decades before the Gothic reworking of the collegiate church in Limburg.

In 1802, during secularisation, the Stift's independence was brought to an end (like many other abbeys and Stifte) and it was given to the Princes of Nassau-Usingen. This seizure took place as part of the German mediatisation, in which the House of Nassau received the Stift as compensation for the loss of the County of Saarbrücken on the left bank of the Rhine. After secularisation, the church was used as a parish church. In 1827, at the request of the Duchy of Nassau, the independent Diocese of Limburg was founded. This diocese contained the territory of the Duchy and the free city of Frankfurt am Main, with the bishop's seat in the former collegiate church of St George, which was promoted to the rank of cathedral.

The first bishop of Limburg was Jakob Brand (1827–1833). The diocese has currently about 700,000 Catholics and is one of the younger dioceses. On 2 February 2007, Pope Benedict XVI accepted the age-related resignation of former bishop Franz Kamphaus. Franz-Peter Tebartz-van Elst was named new bishop on 28 November 2007, and took office on 20 January 2008. He was suspended on 23 October 2013, he was thereupon general vicar Wolfgang Rösch, who in turn was replaced by Georg Bätzing, who was elected to the office of Bishop by the Cathedral Chapter, confirmed by Pope Francis and ordained by Archbishop Woelki in 2016, since 2020 he has been Chairman of the German Bishops‘ Conference.

== Architecture ==
=== Exterior ===
The cathedral is a three-aisled basilica, which combines late Romanesque and early Gothic elements. It has a narthex at the western end and a semi-circular choir with an ambulatory. The outside measures 54.5 m long, with a width of 35.4 m. The building has a complicated structure; seven spires rise from it. The number seven is a symbolic reference to the number of the sacraments. The tallest of these towers are on the western side and rise to a height of 37 m. They form the distinctive "twin-tower façade" of the west front. Such twin-tower façades are common in the Rheinland, for example at Xanten, Andernach and Koblenz. The pointed crossing spire stands above all the other spires with a height of 66 m at the centre of the building. This height is the result of a lightning strike in 1774, before which the tower was 6.5 metres higher. The corner towers on the southern transept were erected in 1863.

The west front is divided into five levels. The most eye-catching stylistic element is a huge round window, surrounded by eight small rosettes, which forms a clear centre of the west front. The rosette symbolises the four Evangelists. Despite the symmetry of the twin towers, there is rich variation in forms and building elements, e.g. round and pointed arches, pilaster strips, small pillars, archivolts, windows and blind arches. The upper level of the north tower includes Gothic elements (e.g. window tracery).

During restorations between 1872 and 1873, the polychrome exterior painting of the cathedral was removed (the colours were, previously, white, red, yellow-brown, black and a little green) and the stone was left bare. Between 1968 and 1972, the polychrome exterior was restored, using remains of the colour from the period before 1872 in order to reconstruct the old patterns.

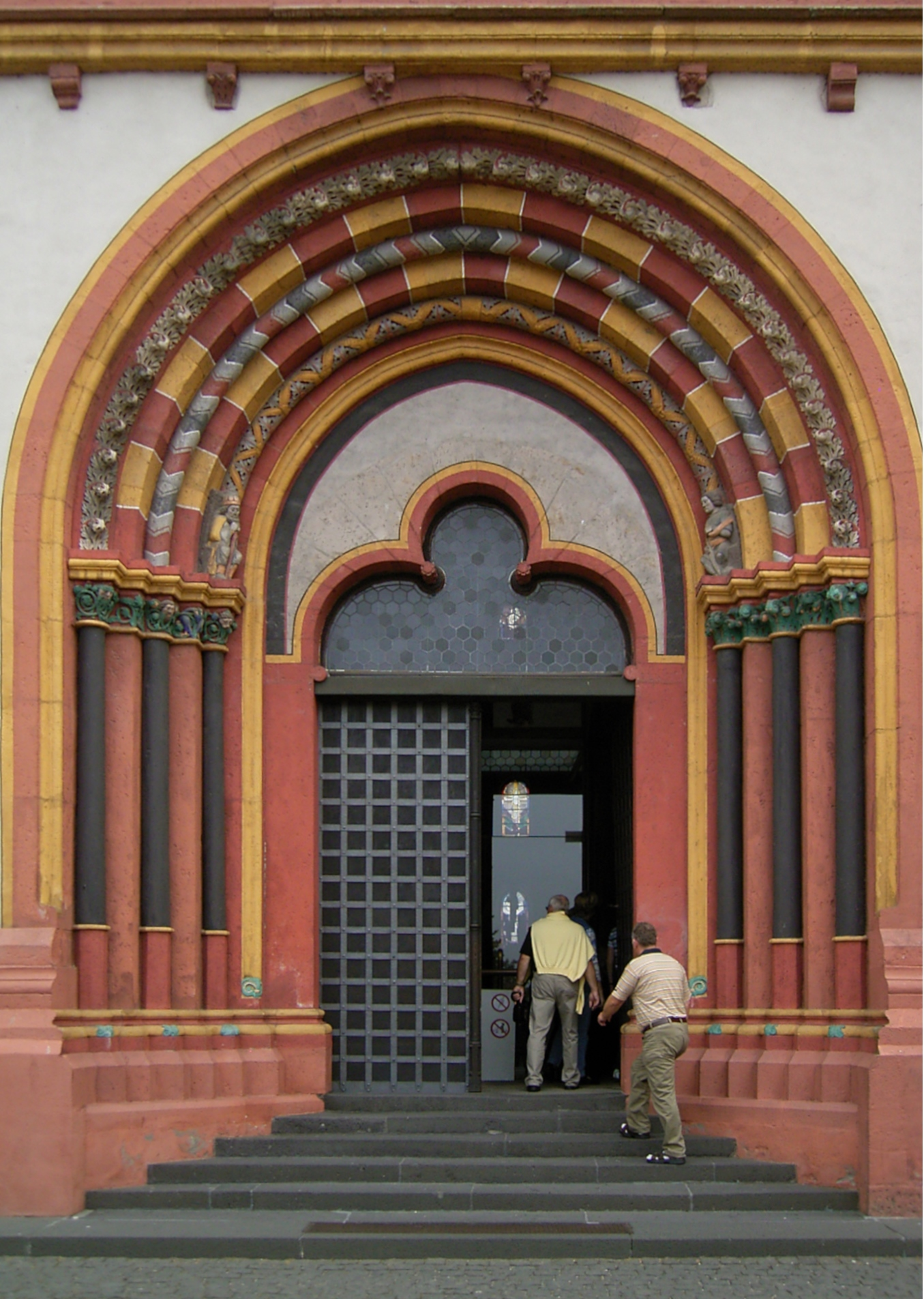
Main portal with cloverleaf door opening and three-step pointed arch

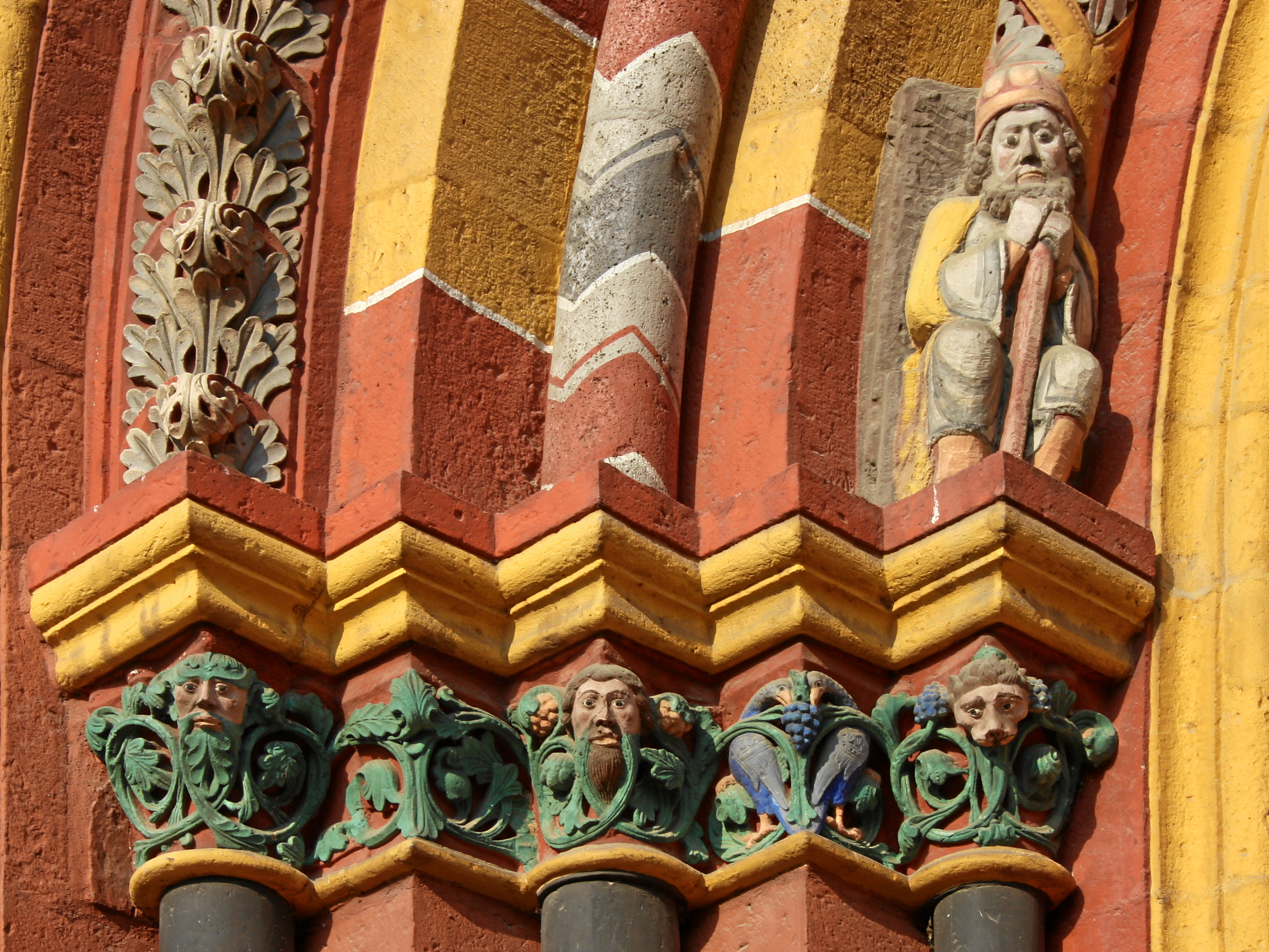
The seated figure left of the main door is the patron Saint Nicholas

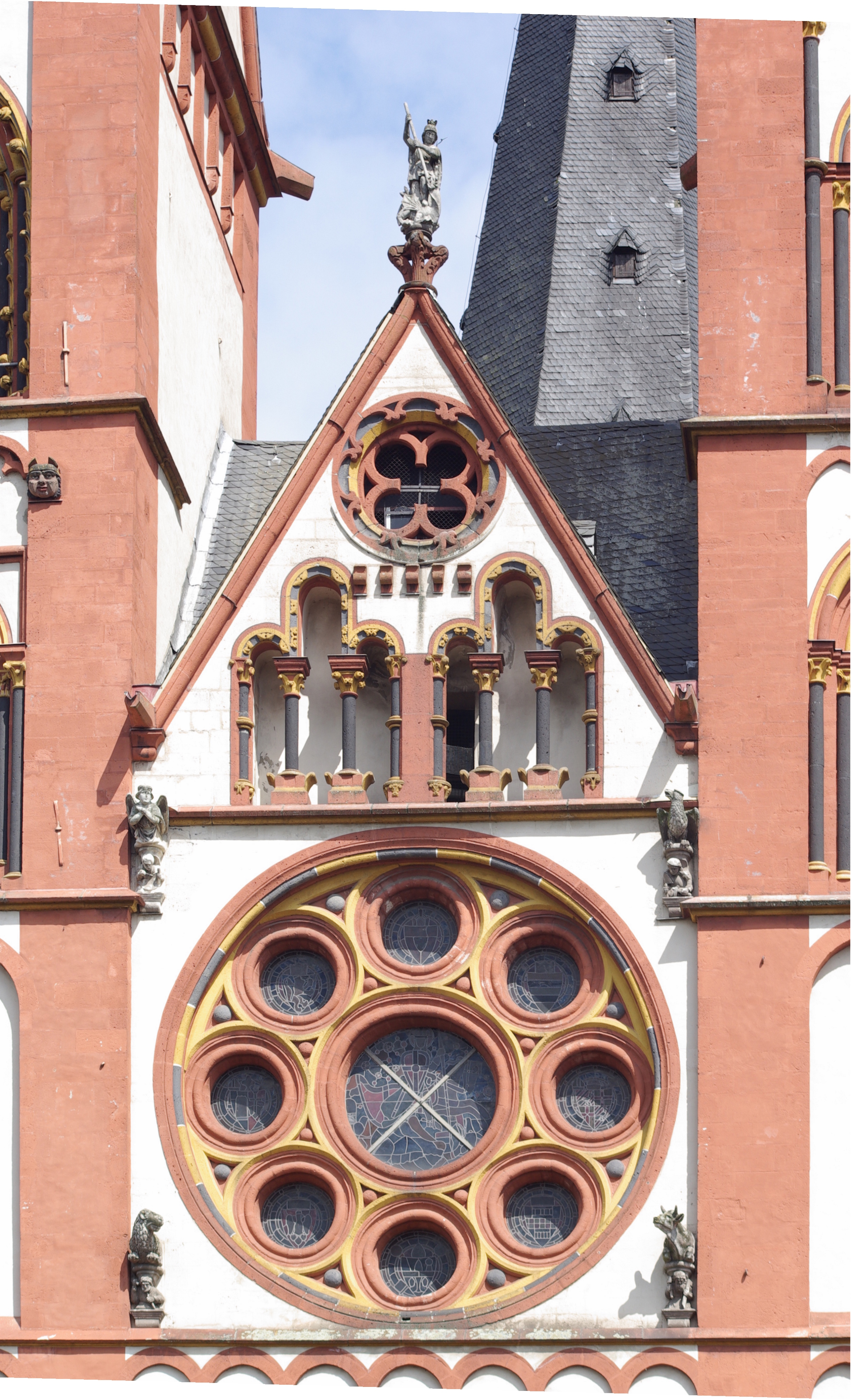
Rose window in the west front with early Gothic circular tracery

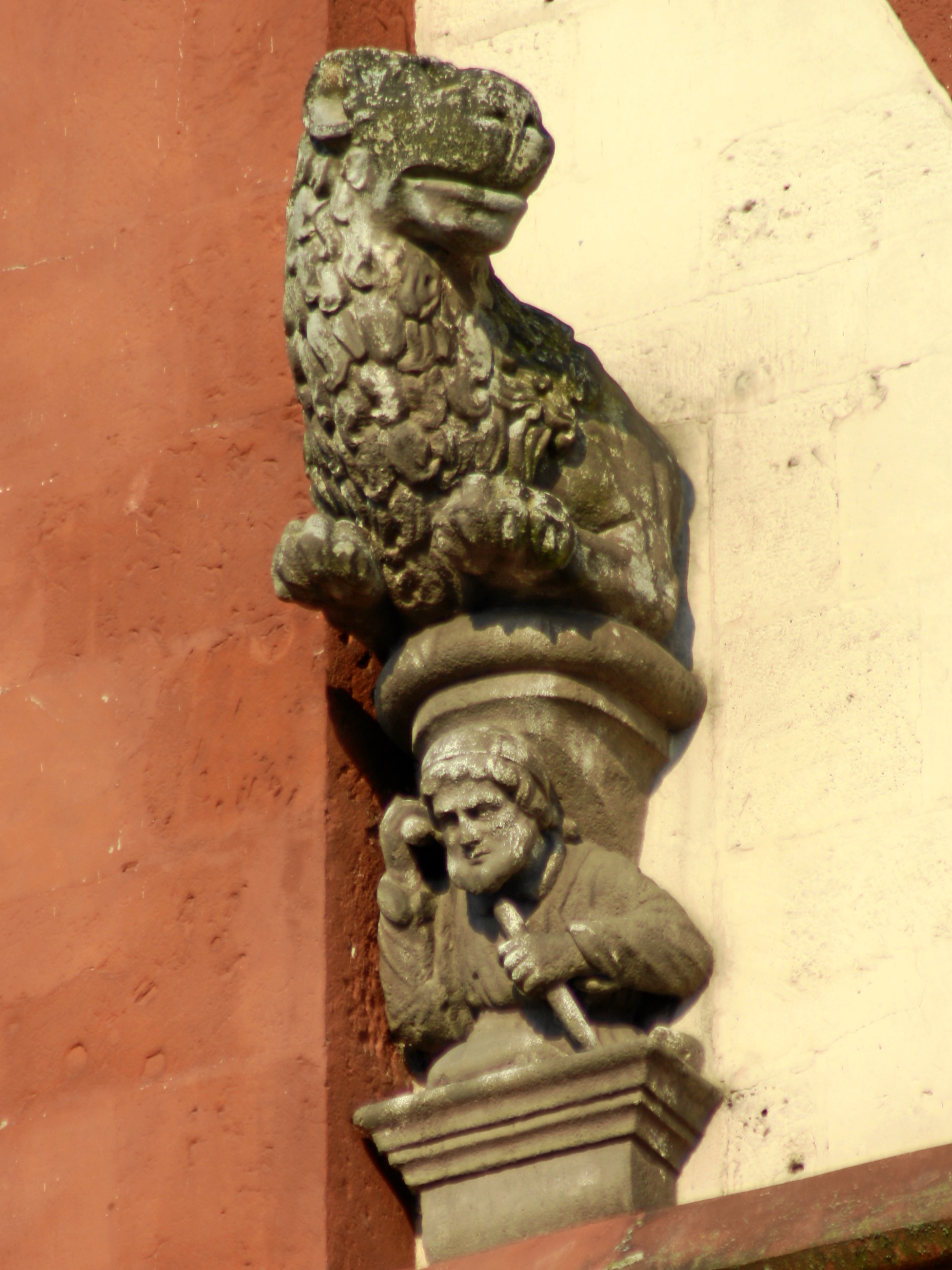
Bust of the Evangelist Mark with his symbol, the lion, on the west front

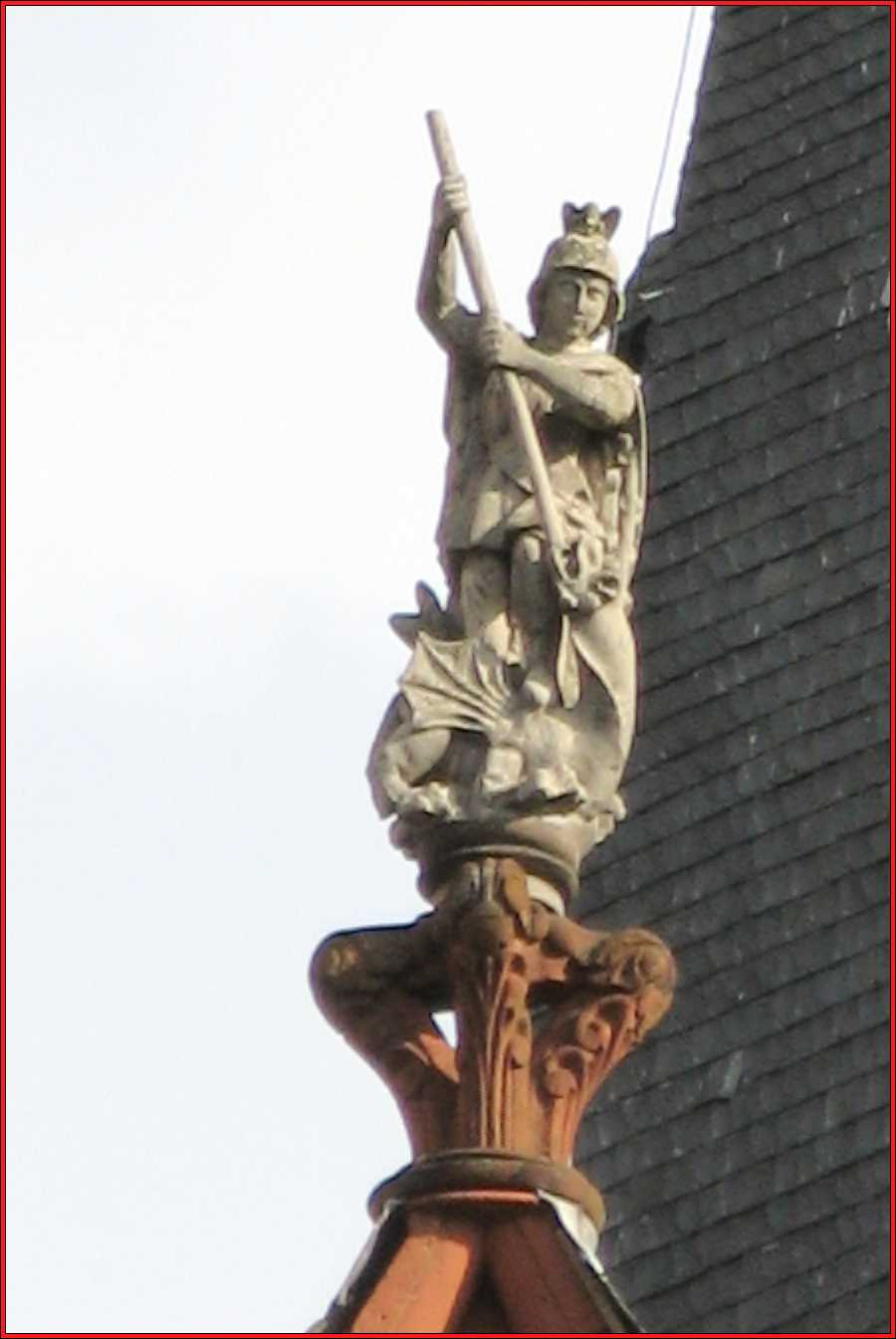
Saint George above the entrance to the cathedral, west front

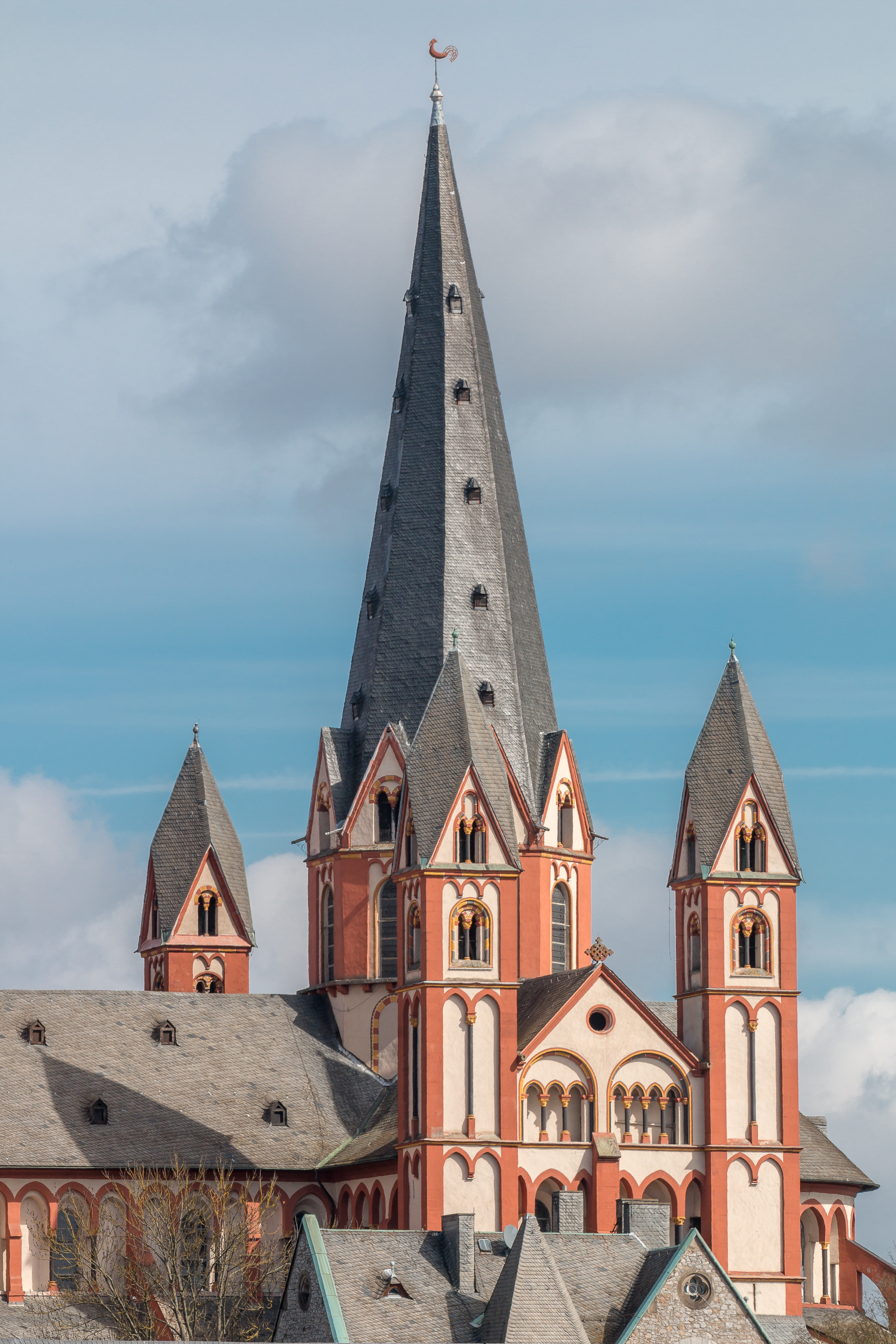
The crossing spire and the towers of the transepts

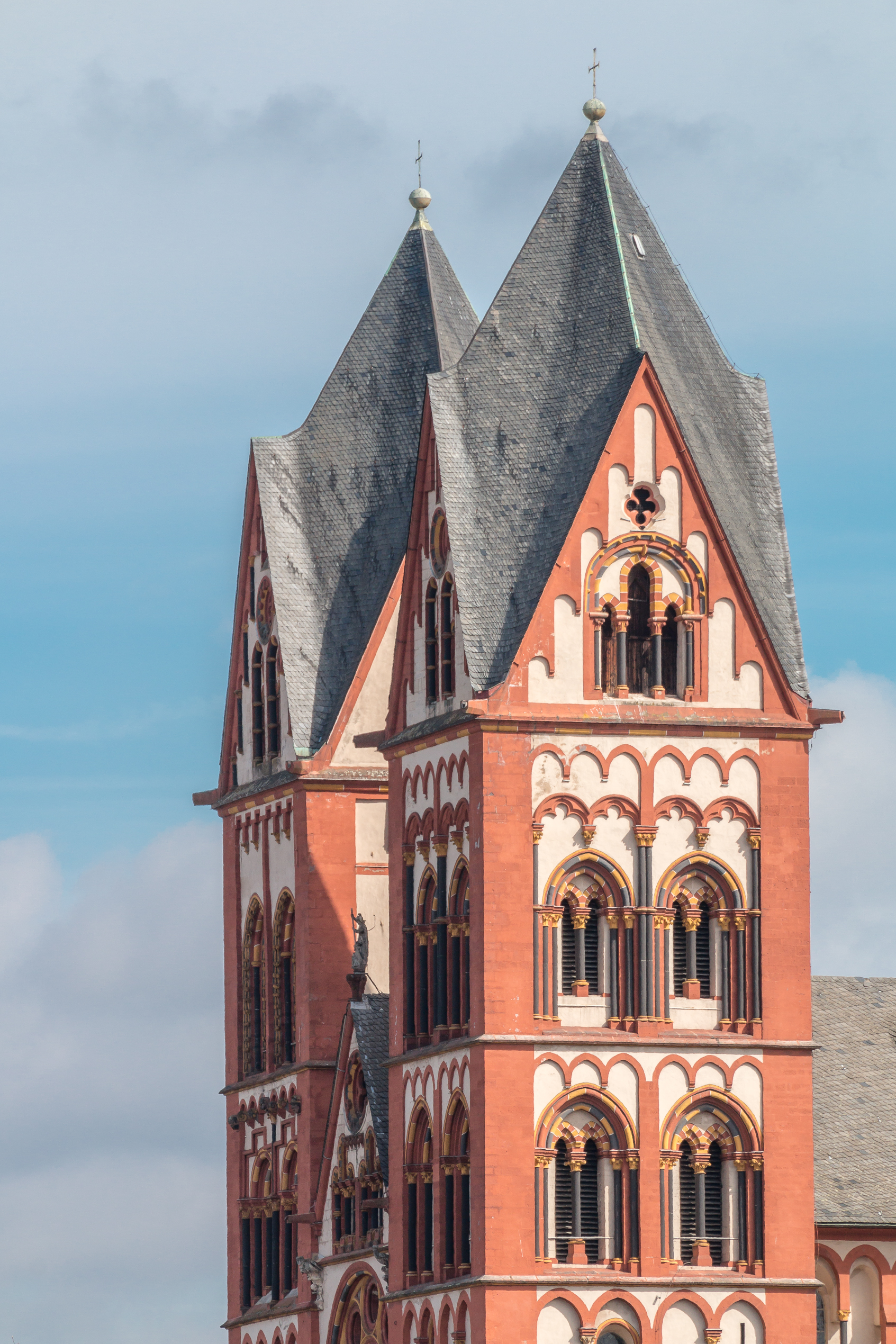
Towers of the west front

=== Interior ===
The interior of the cathedral (nave and choir) is dominated by the completely undecorated buttresses, which reach all the way to the ceiling. More of the buttress system is hidden in the galleries of the side aisles. The comparatively plain and bright interior is marked by a narrow, high central nave. It is divided into four levels with arcades, galleries, triforia and clerestories.

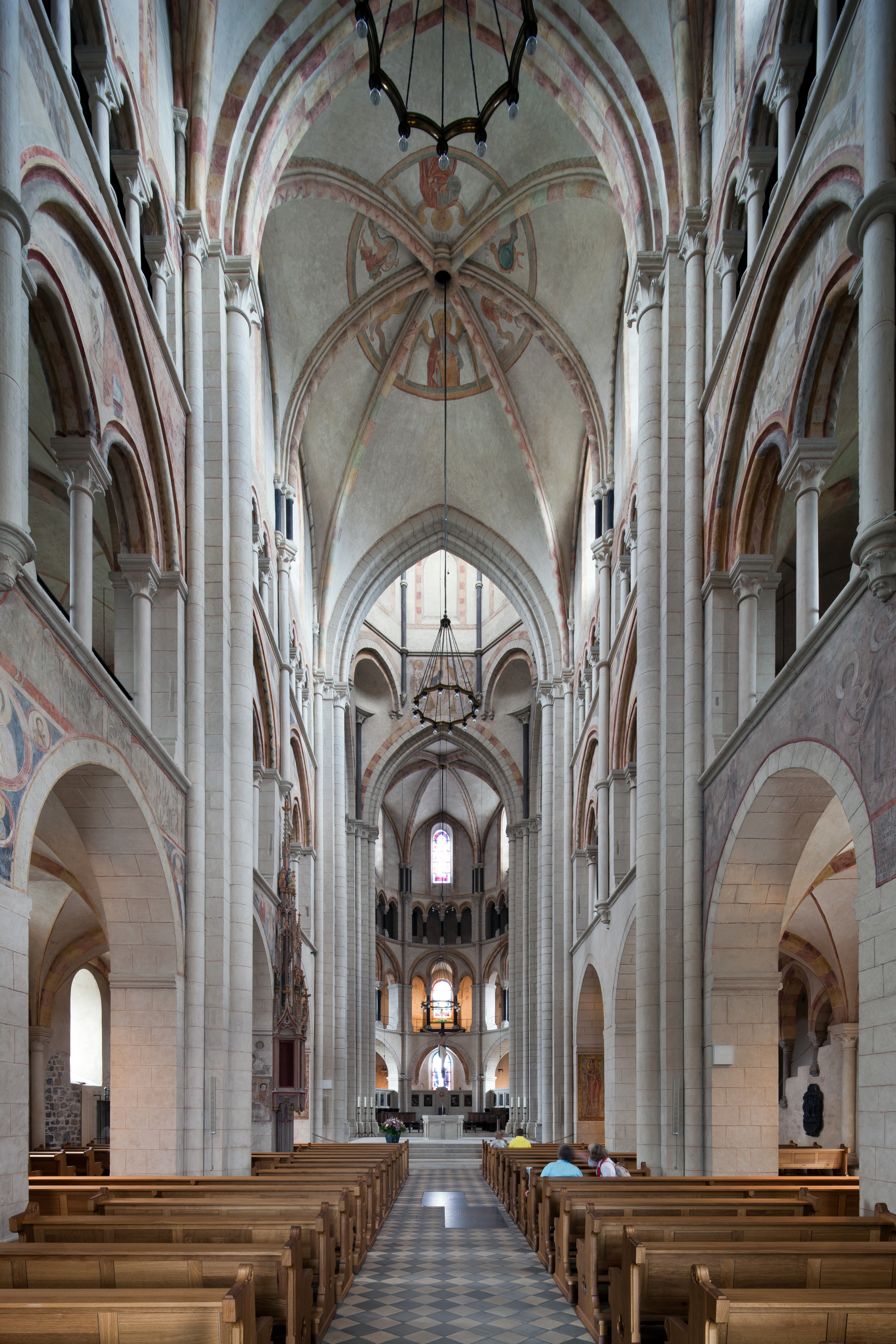
Interior from the narthex, looking east

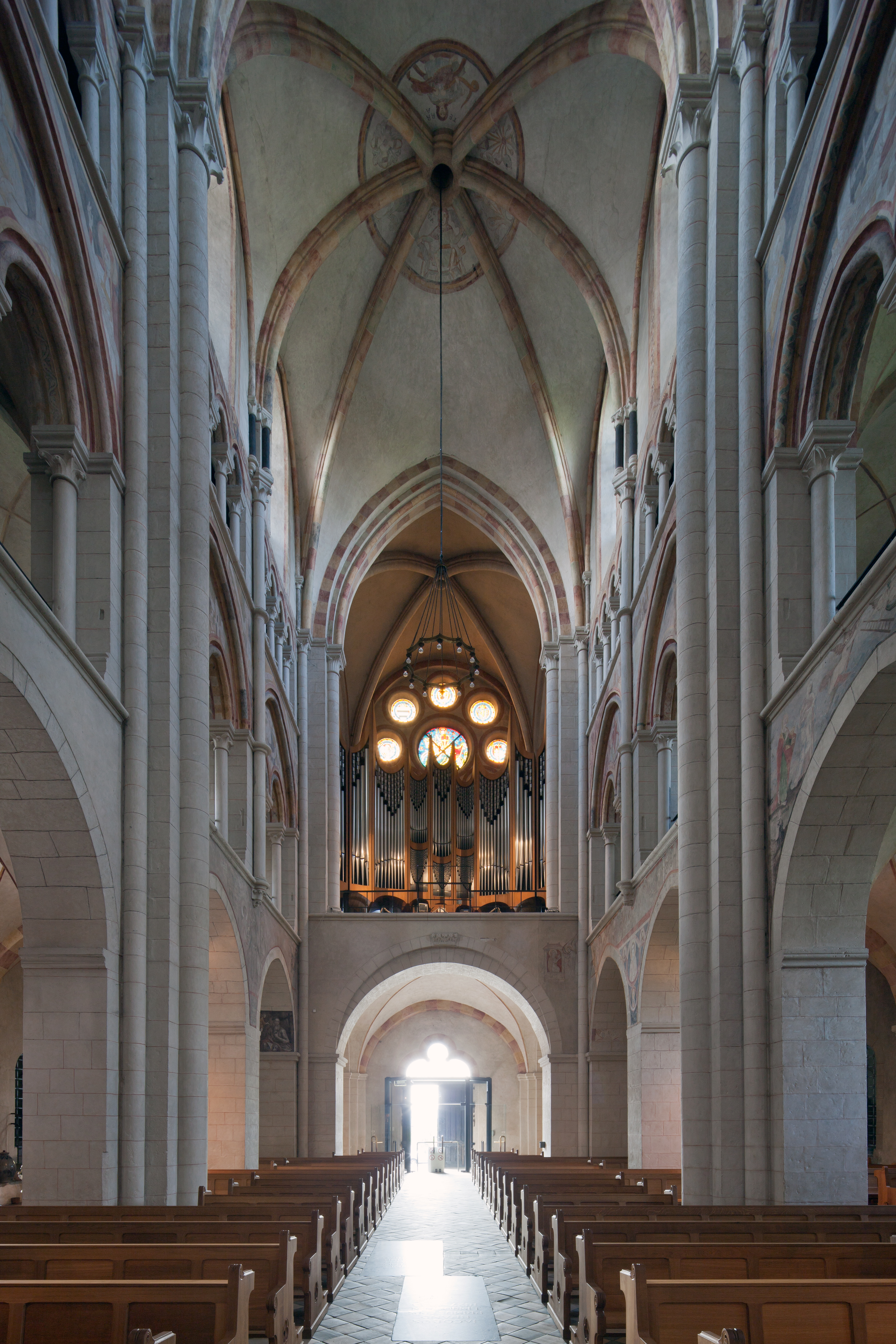
Interior from the crossing, looking west

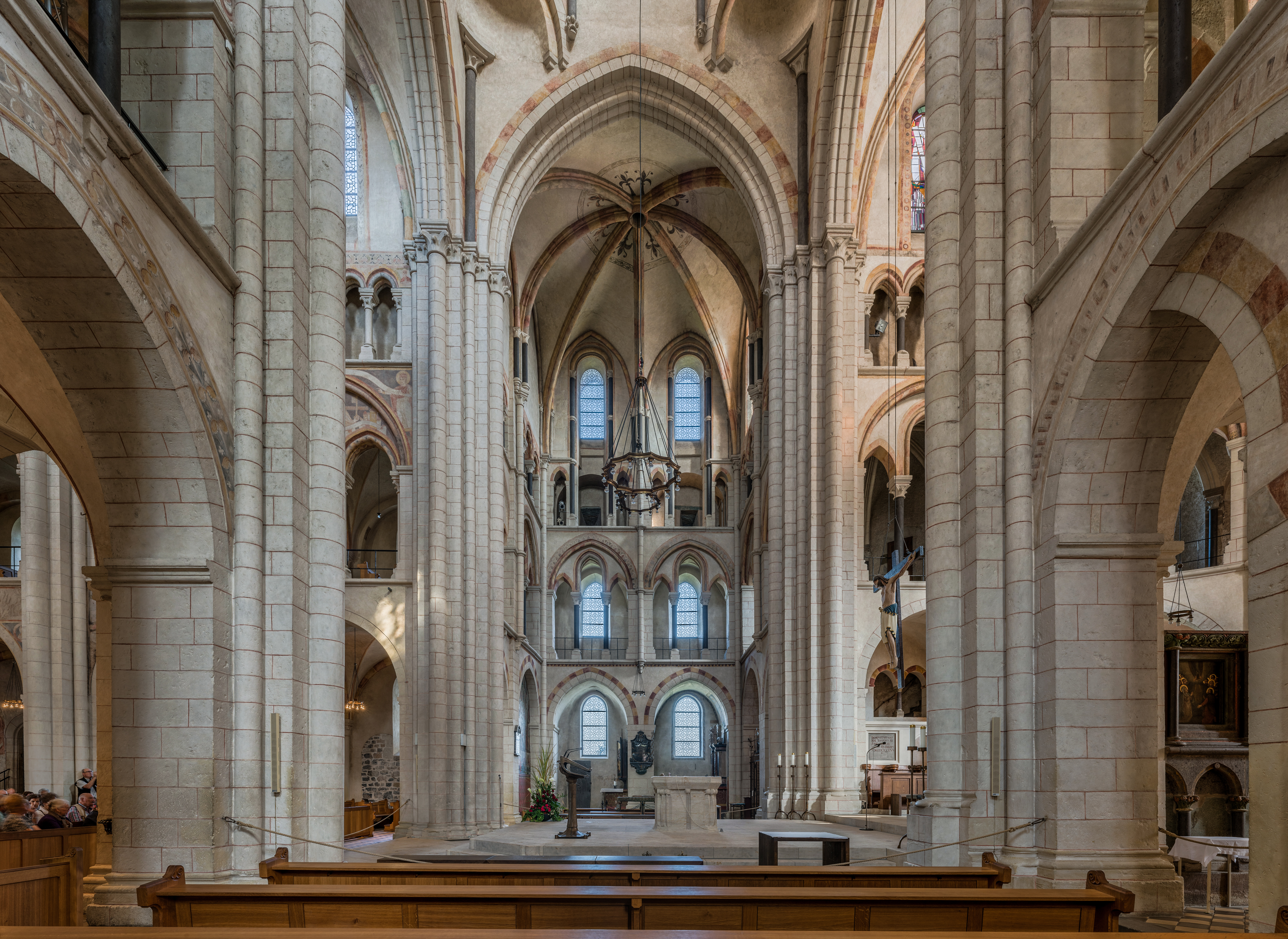
Crossing and transept, looking north

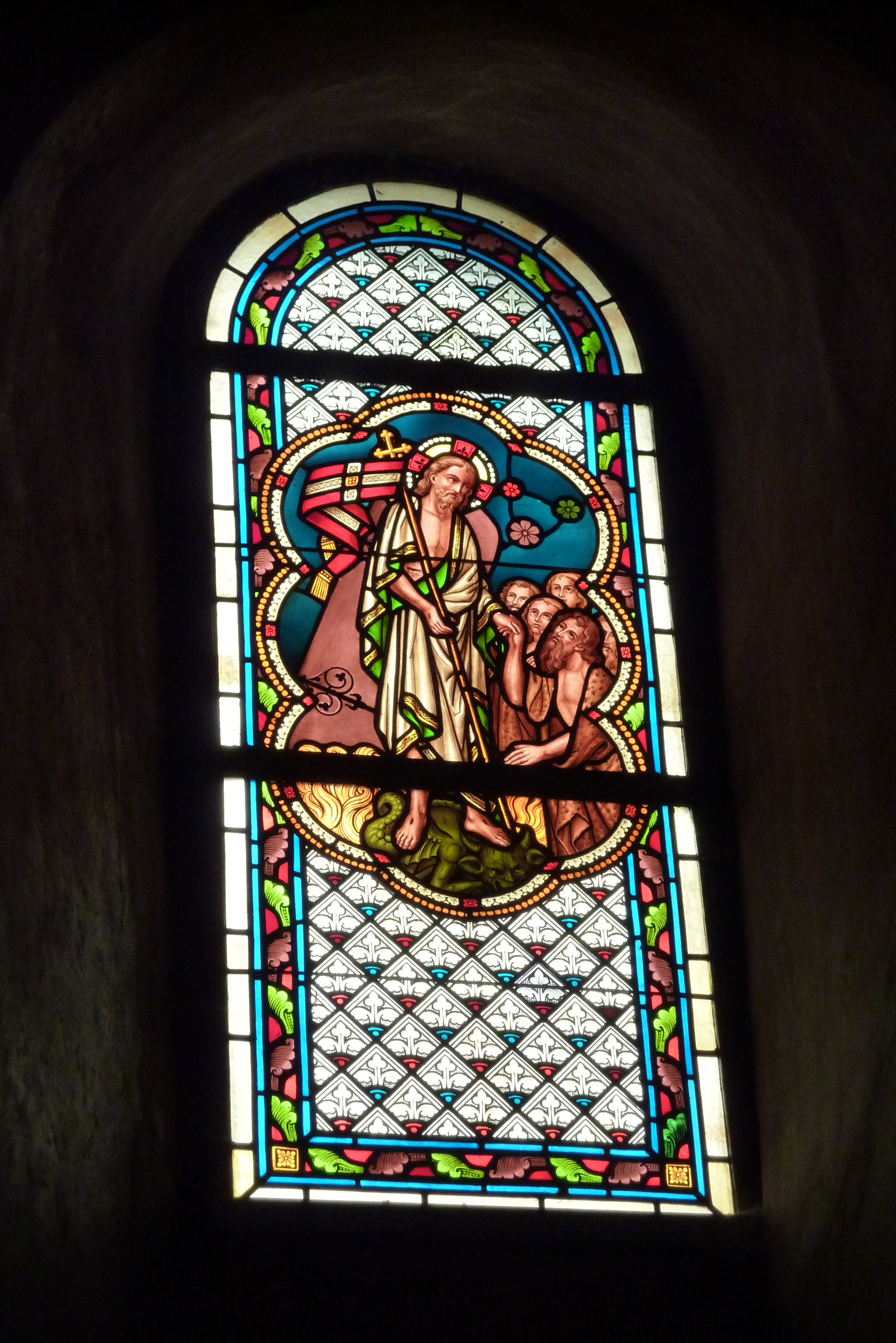
Medieval window in the back part of the cathedral (peristyle)

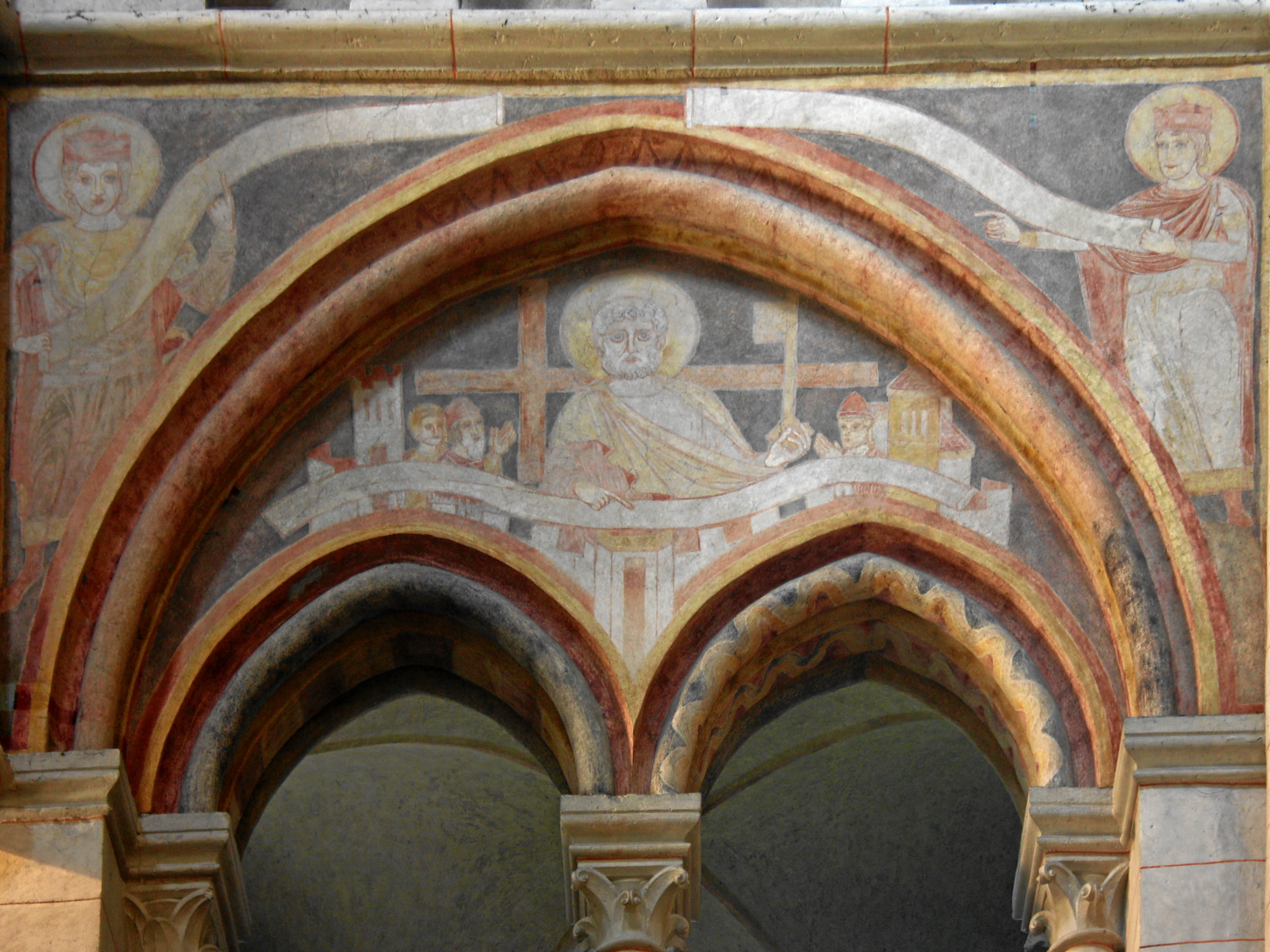
Late Romanesque frescoes above the galleries of the nave

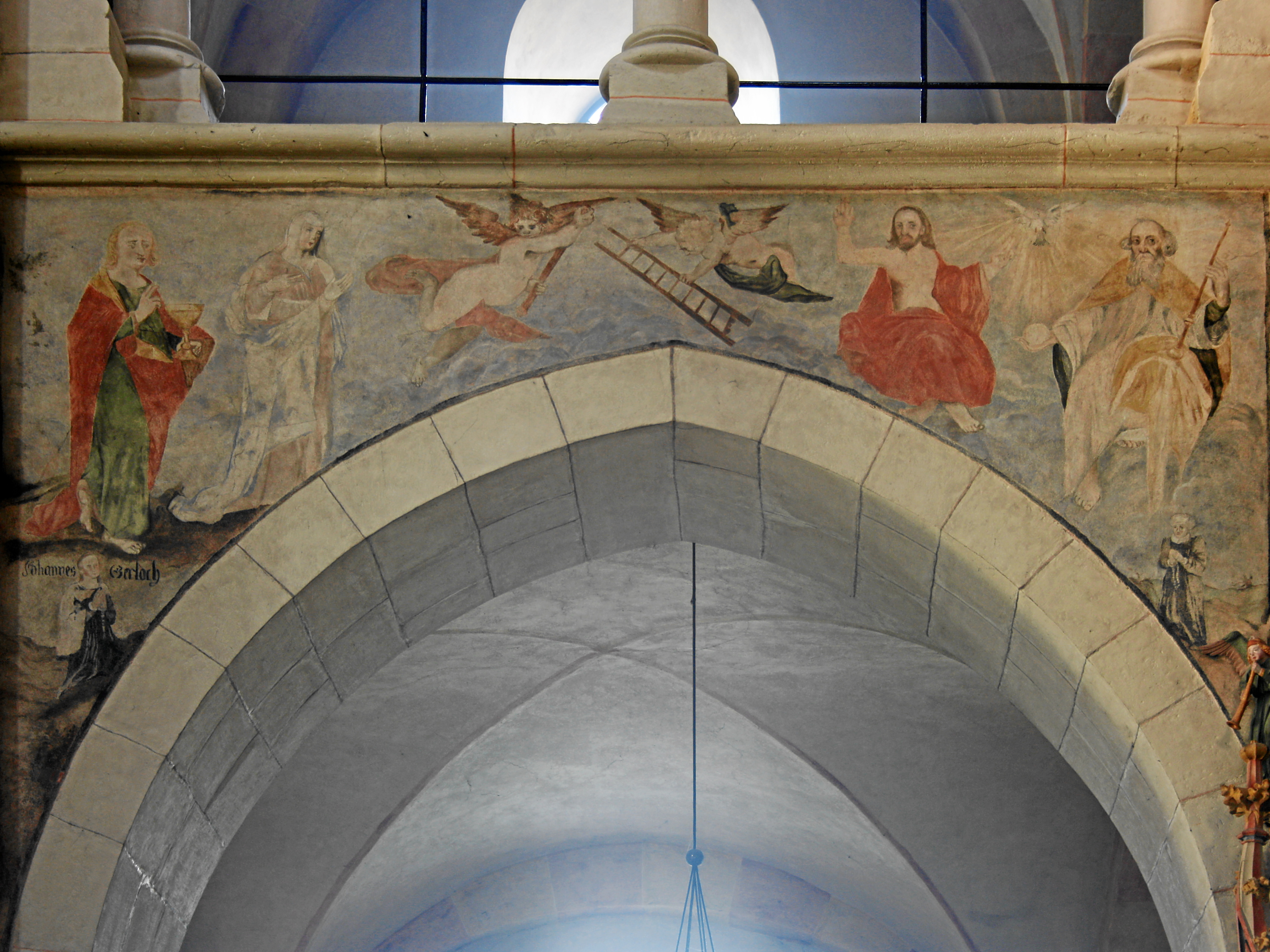
Early modern frescoes above the nave arcade

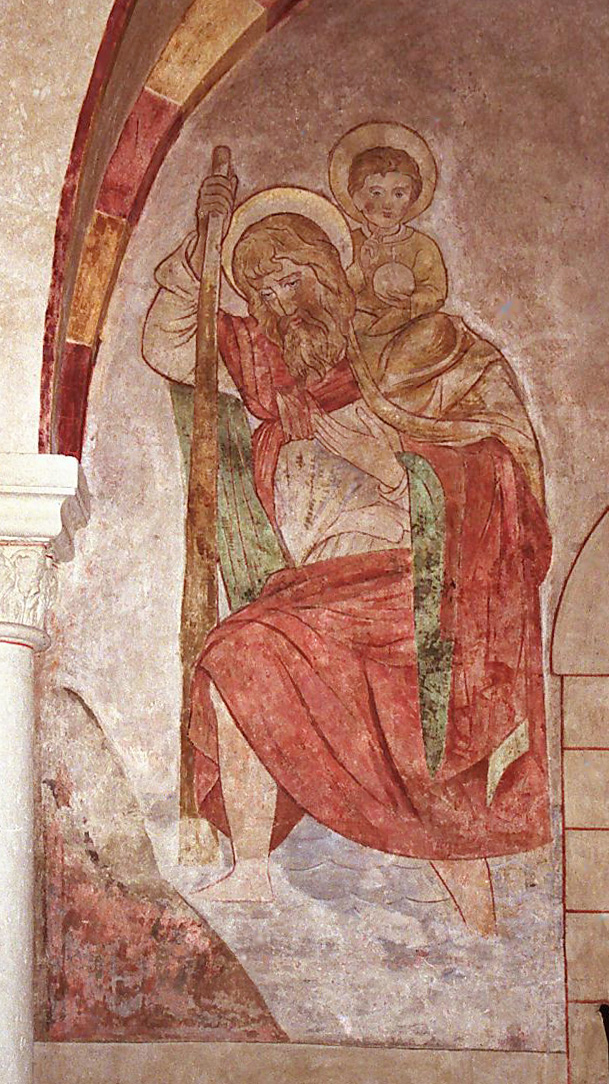
Late Gothic wall painting of Saint Christopher

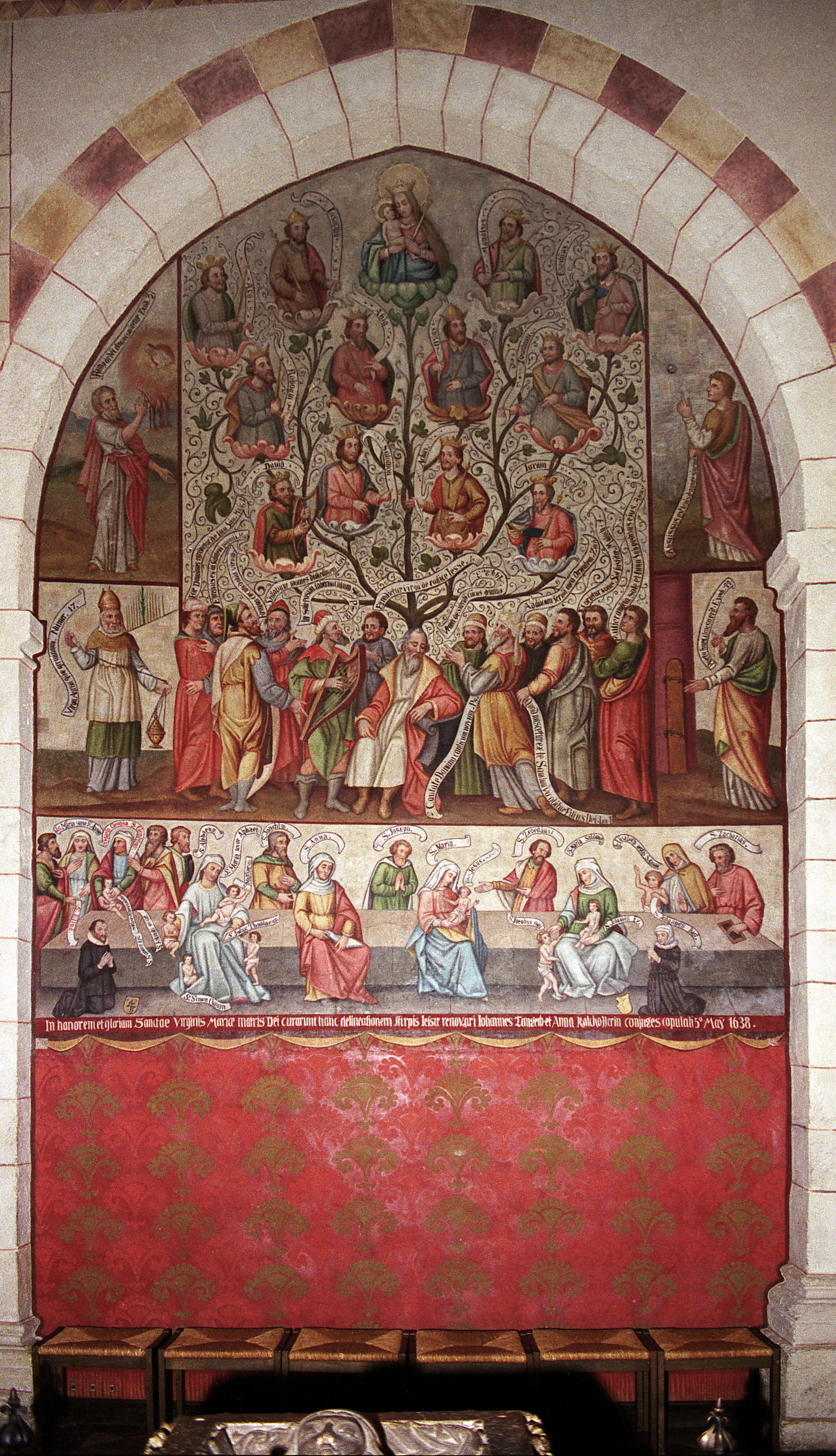
Late Gothic wall painting of the ancestry of Jesus

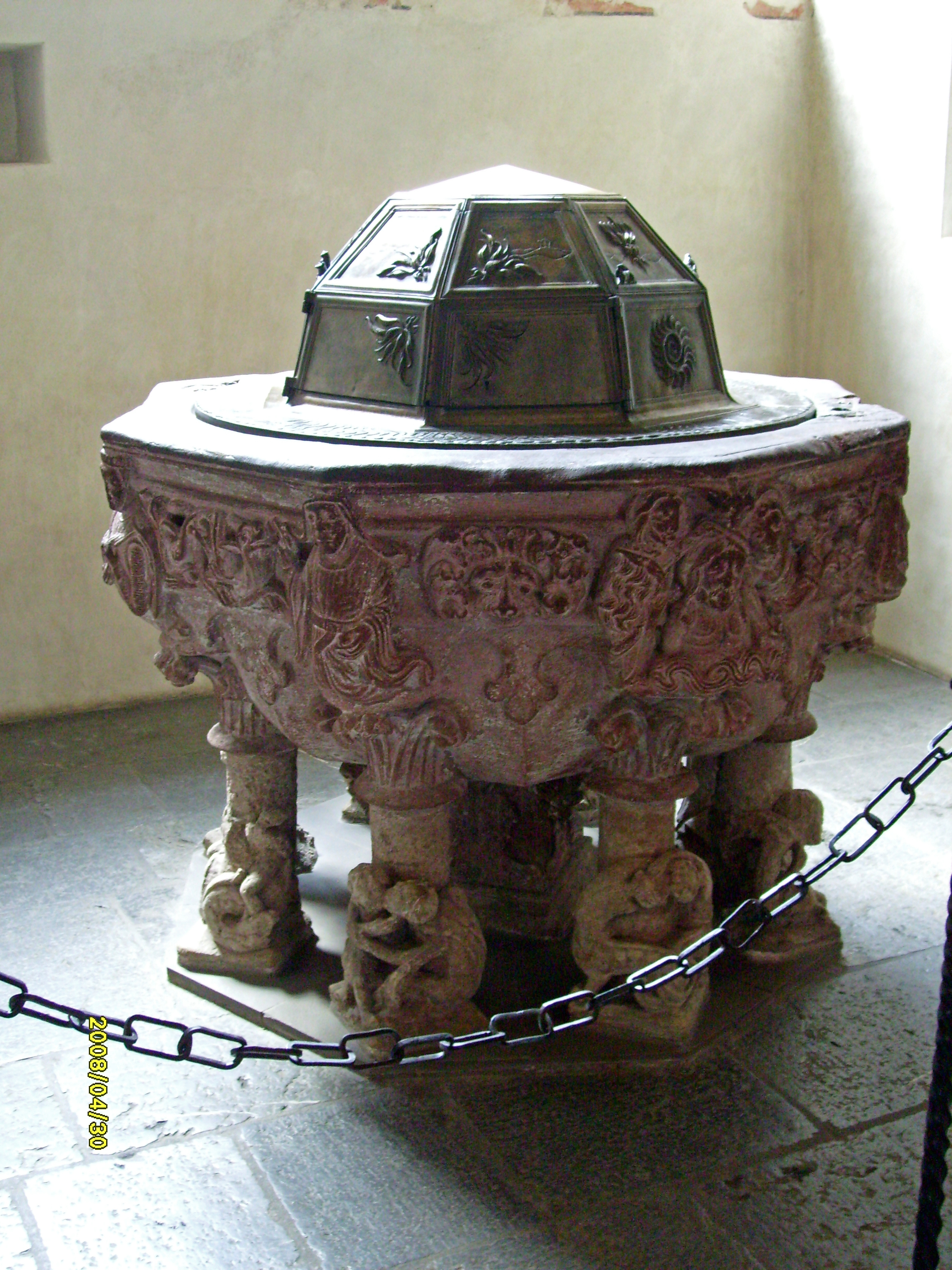
Late Romanesque baptismal font

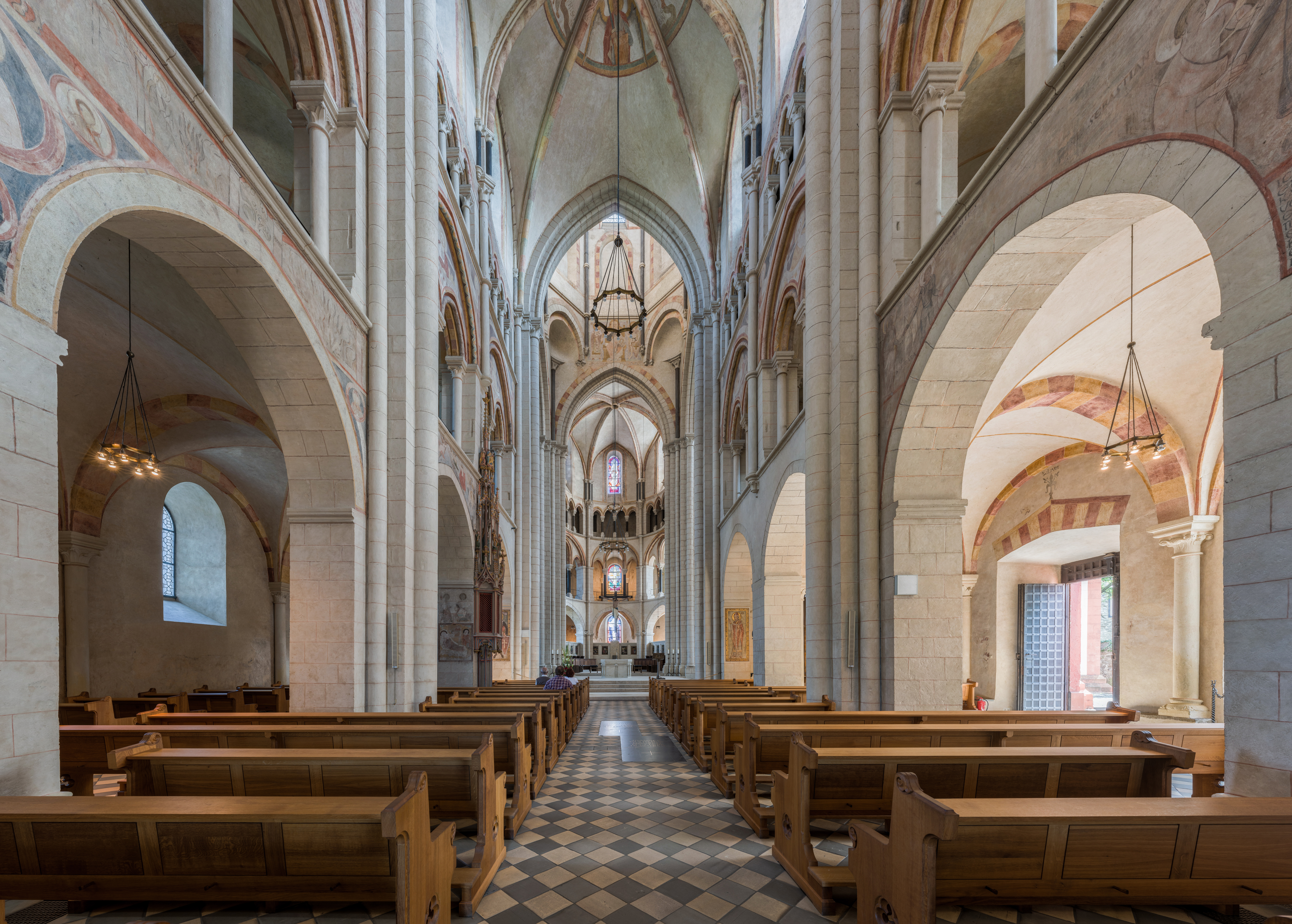
The central nave towards the east

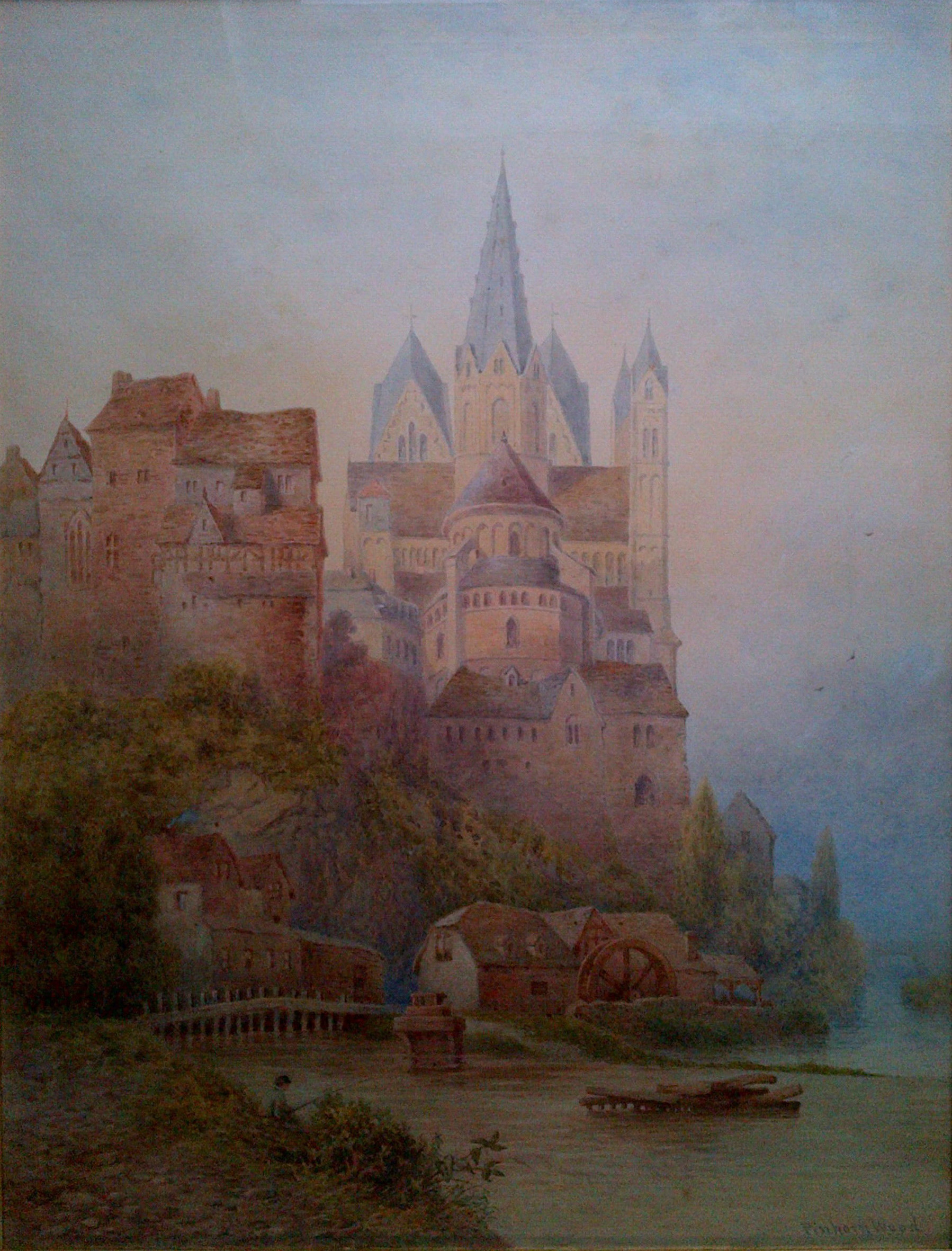
Limburg Cathedral and castle painted by Lewis Pinhorn Wood, when the cathedral was grey

== Organ ==
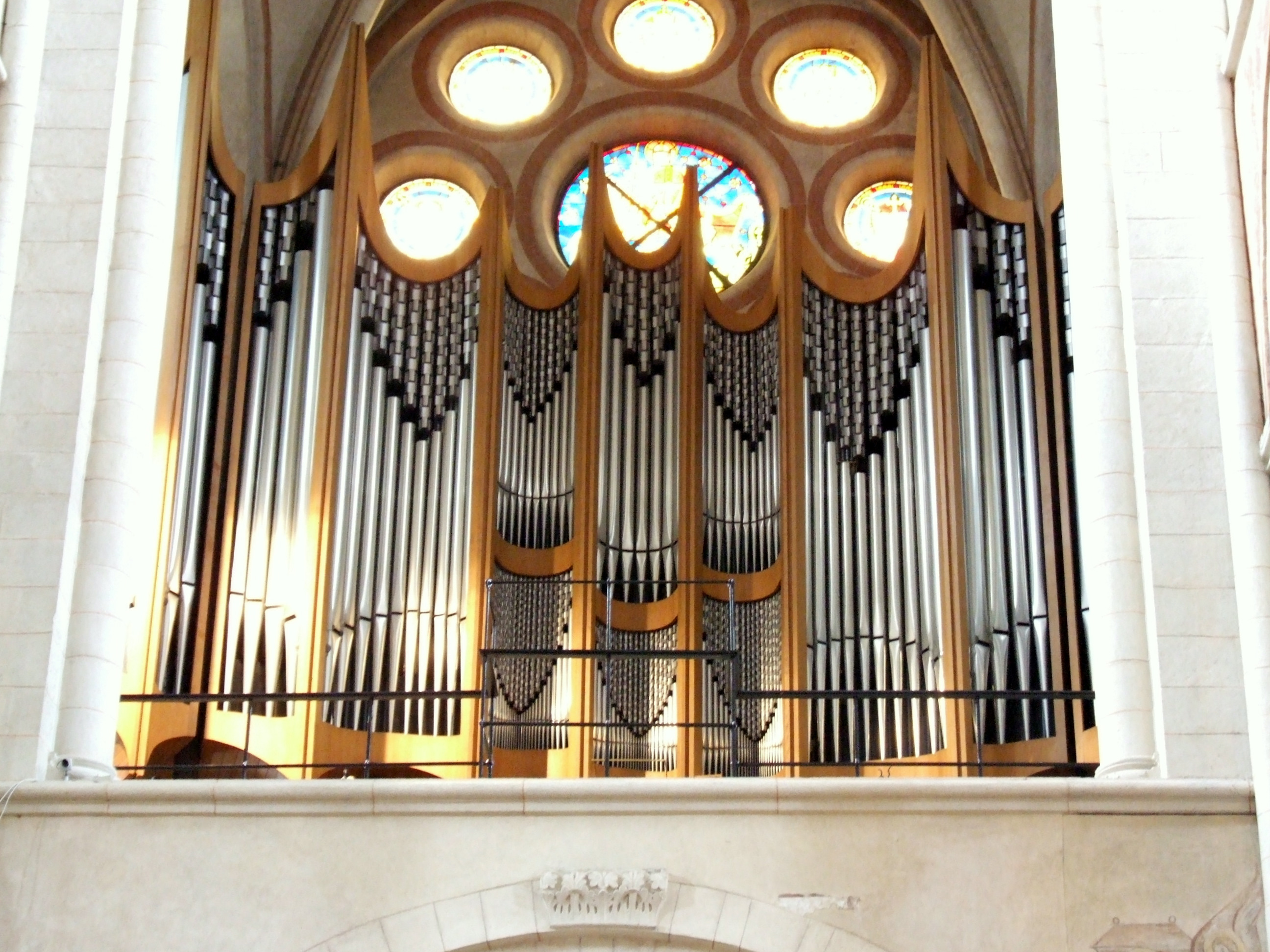
Klais' cathedral organ (1978)

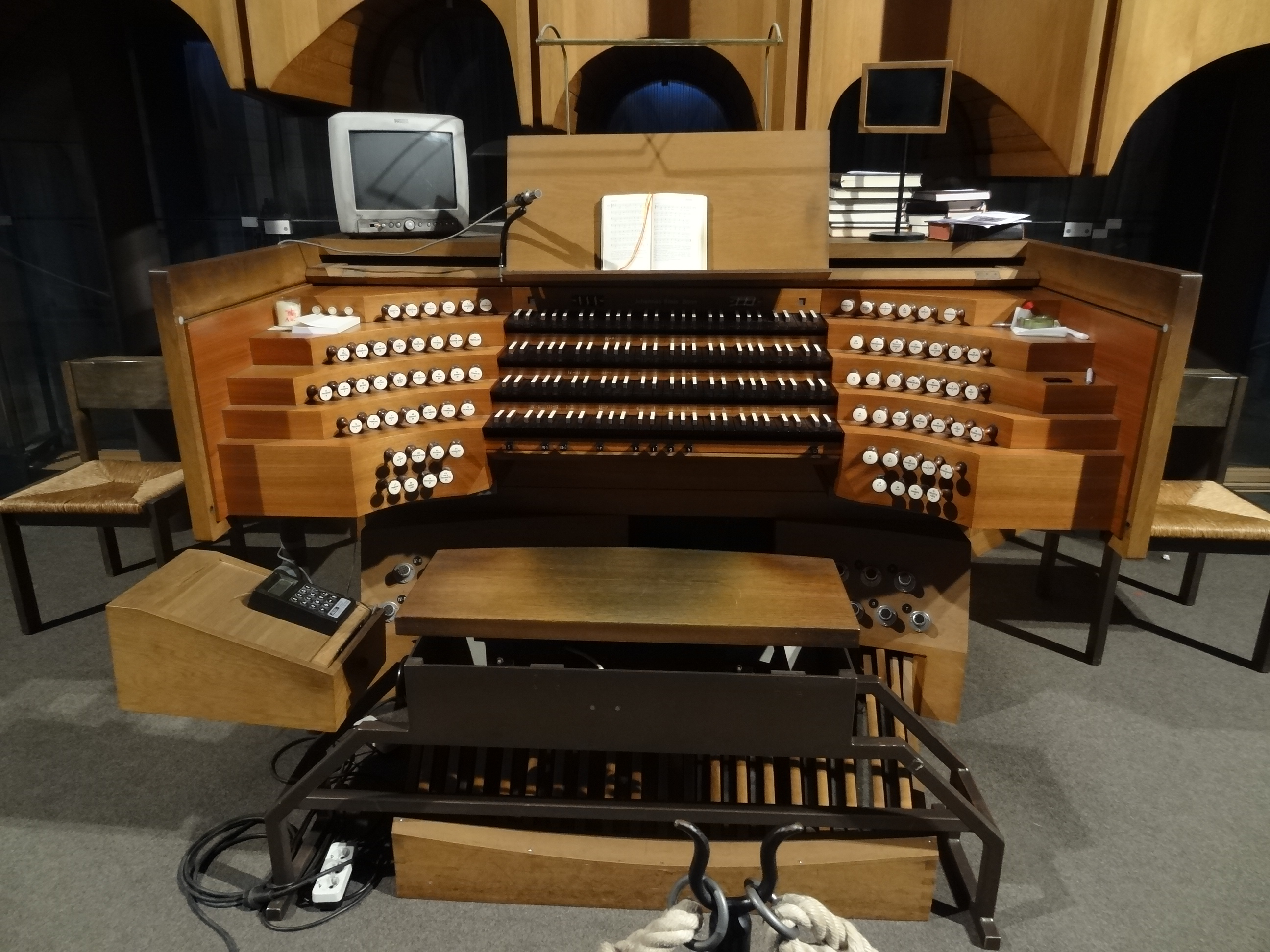
Playing station with four manuals

Organ playing is repeatedly documented in the 14th century; in 1443 two organs are mentioned. After several renovations in the 16th and 17th centuries, the main organ was broken in 1749 and Johann Christian Köhler created a new organ (1750–1752). A. and M. Keller of Limburg converted the Baroque housing to a neo-Romanesque style between 1872 and 1877, while retaining Köhler's register. An almost complete rebuild within the neo-Romanesque casing was carried out in 1912 by Johannes Klais, a thorough renovation in 1935 and a neo-Baroque extension in the neo-Baroque style in 1960, by the same organ builder. The current organ was installed in a modern casing in the west gallery by Klais in 1978. The instrument contains over 60 organ stops in four manuals and pedals. The tracker action is mechanical, while the register tracking is electrical.

=== Choirs ===
Choirs dedicated to singing services at the cathedral are the Limburger Domsingknaben, the Mädchenkantorei and the Domchor.

== Bells ==
The cathedral's peal consists of nine bells. Seven of them form the main peal and are located in the south tower. Of these, the largest and smallest bell are the remnants of the peal cast in 1906 by the bellfounders Petit & Gebr. Edelbrock of Gescher (a^{0}–c^{1}–d^{1}–e^{1}–g^{1}–a^{1}); they were able to be saved from destruction during the Second World War. In 1949 the other five bells (2–6) were added, which were designed to match the old bells in tone and theme. Only bell number 5 "Konrad Kurzbold" is newly arranged and added to the tone sequence. These seven bells are rung together for Christmas, Epiphany, the Gloria on Maundy Thursday and Easter Vigil, Pentecost, the Feast of St George, the anniversary of the church's consecration, and consecration services.

Two old bells hang in the north tower. The larger, called Sterm ("Stormbell") is a sugarloaf bell with neither symbol nor inscription, whose style dates it to 1200–1250. The smaller Uhrglocke ("hour bell") from the year 1447 originally hung in the uppermost window of the south tower. Since 1986 the two bells have been active once more. The Uhrglocke was made into a baptismal bell and is rung during every baptismal service. In addition, it is part of a special peal at Christmas time and for First Communion. Sterm is rung at Easter masses during Holy Week and for Lauds on Maundy Thursday. The full peal (Tutti) of all nine bells rings before and after the Pontifical High Mass on Easter Sunday.

No.	Name	Casting year	Caster, Gussort	Ø (mm)	Weight (kg)	Nominal (ST-^{1}/_{16})	Order of ringing (solistisch)
1	Georg	1906	Petit & Gebr. Edelbrock, Location	1910	4466	a^{0} ±0	Call to prayer / Transubstantiation on High Holidays, Death of the Pope, bishop or Cathedral cleric
2	Salvator	1949	Petit & Gebr. Edelbrock, Location	1600	2534	c^{1} −2	Hour of death of Jesus (3 pm), Call to prayer / Transubstantiation on ordinary Sundays
3	Maria	1949	Petit & Gebr. Edelbrock, Location	1410	1734	d^{1} −1	Angelus bell 6 pm, Call Lenten sermons
4	Josef	1949	Petit & Gebr. Edelbrock, Location	1240	1137	e^{1} −2	Call to prayer for Feast of Joseph
5	Konrad Kurzbold	1949	Petit & Gebr. Edelbrock, Location	1170	998	f^{1} −2	Angelus bell 7 am and noon
6	Nikolaus	1949	Petit & Gebr. Edelbrock, Location	1030	648	g^{1} −2	Nicholas compline, Priest Thursday
7	Bernhard	1906	Petit & Gebr. Edelbrock, Location	910	468	a^{1} +1	–
8	Sterm	1200–1250	unknown	1031	570	g^{1} +2/–2	Work days of Holy Week
9	Uhrglocke	1447	unknown	673	~260	es^{2} −7	Baptisms

== Concerts ==
The cathedral is used for concerts, such as the premiere of the oratorio Laudato si' on 6 November in 2016, composed by Peter Reulein on a libretto by Helmut Schlegel on a commission from the Diocese of Limburg.

== See also ==
- Saint George: Devotions, traditions and prayers

== Bibliography ==
- Matthias Theodor Kloft: Dom und Domschatz in Limburg an der Lahn. Verlag Langewiesche, Königstein im Taunus 2016 (= Die Blauen Bücher) ISBN 978-3-7845-4826-5
- Matthias Theodor Kloft: Limburg an der Lahn – Der Dom. Verlag Schnell und Steiner, 19th revised edition, 2015, ISBN 978-3-7954-4365-8
- Pfarrgemeinderat der Dompfarrei Limburg (ed.): 750 Jahre Limburger Dom – 1235–1985. Limburg 1985
- Georg Ulrich Großmann: Mittel- und Südhessen: Lahntal, Taunus, Rheingau, Wetterau, Frankfurt und Maintal, Kinzig, Vogelsberg, Rhön, Bergstraße und Odenwald. DuMont, Köln 1995 ISBN 978-3-7701-2957-7 (= DuMont Kunst-Reiseführer), pp. 66–69
- Robert Laut: Die Herrschaft Limburg und ihr Übergang von den Konradinern über die Häuser Gleiberg-Luxemburg, Peilstein, Leiningen an Isenburg. In: Nassauische Annalen, 65. Band, 1954. pp. 81–85
- Walter Lutz: Zur Geschichte der Kirchenmusik am Dom zu Limburg von den Anfängen bis zur Gegenwart. Schott, Mainz 1986 ISBN 978-3-7957-1328-7 (Beiträge zur mittelrheinischen Musikgeschichte 27)
- Wolfgang Metternich: Der Dom zu Limburg an der Lahn. Wissenschaftliche Buchgesellschaft, Darmstadt 1994 ISBN 978-3-534-01579-5
- Wolfgang Metternich: Die Entstehung der Stifts- und Domkirche in Limburg an der Lahn. In: Nassauische Annalen, 104. Band, 1993. pp. 1–28
- Wolfram Nicol (ed.): Der Dom zu Limburg. Gesellschaft für Mittelrheinische Kirchengeschichte, Mainz 1985 (Digitalisat)
- Wolf-Heino Struck: Die Gründung des Stifts St. Georg und die Erbauung der heutigen Kathedrale in Limburg a.d. Lahn. In: Nassauische Annalen, 97. Band, 1986. pp. 1–31
- Rudolf Wolf: Die Säkularisation des St. Georg-Stifts zu Limburg im Jahre 1803. In: Archiv für mittelrheinische Kirchengeschichte 55 (2003), pp. 333–379
- Rainer-Josef Zensen: Der Dom St. Georg zu Limburg an der Lahn. In: Nassauische Annalen. Band 110, 1999 ISSN 0077-2887, pp. 57–70
