= Liebfrauen, Frankfurt =

Liebfrauen
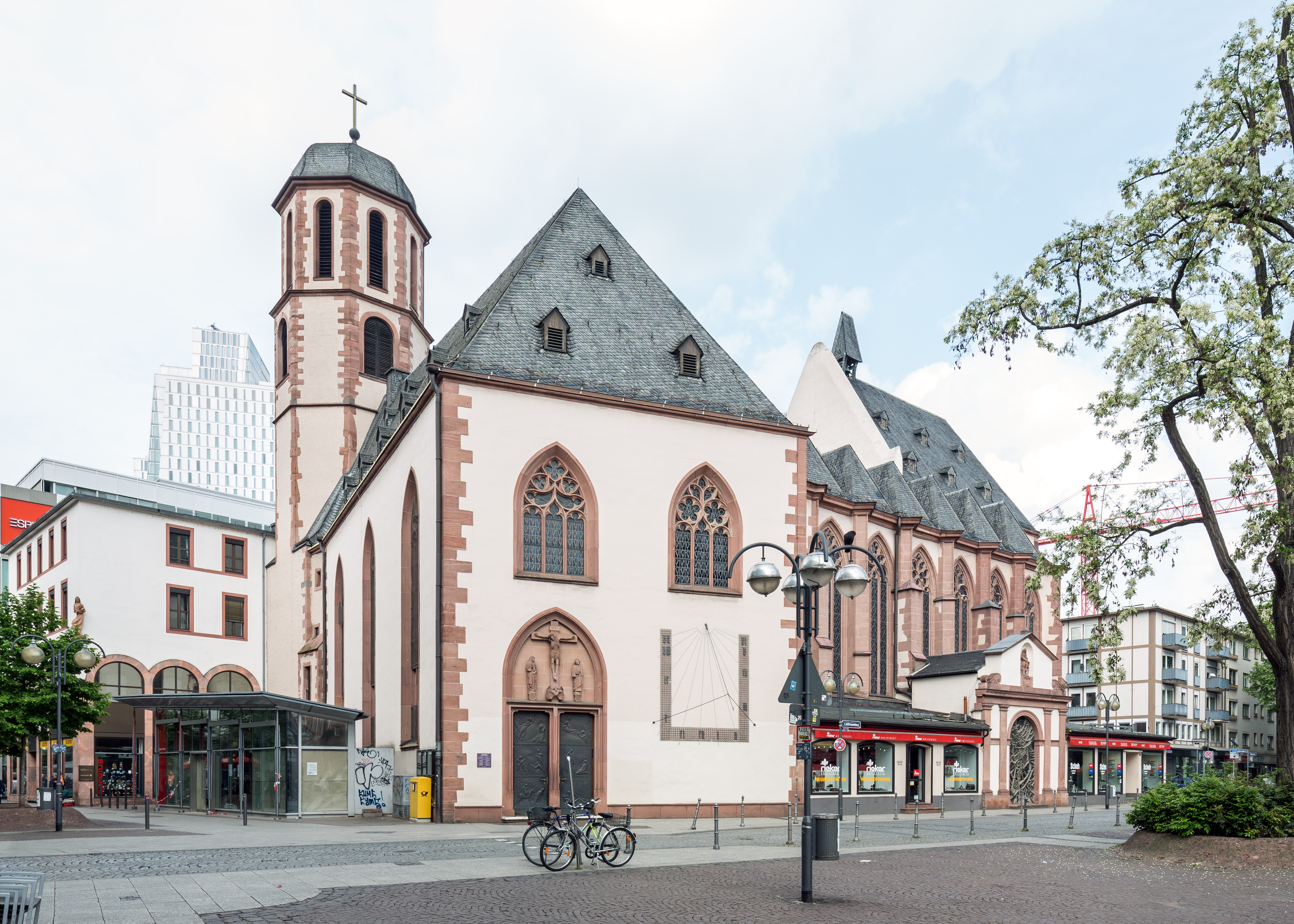
- The church from the southwest in May 2014
- Liebfrauen
- 50°06′47″N 8°40′53″E
- Location: Frankfurt am Main, Germany
- Denomination: Catholic
- Website: liebfrauen.net

History
- Status: Monastery church; Rektoratskirche
- Dedication: Mary
- Consecrated: 1344

Administration
- Diocese: Limburg

Liebfrauenkirche ("Our Lady", literally "Dear Lady") is a Gothic-style Catholic parish church, located in the centre of Frankfurt, Germany. It was built in several phases from the 14th to the 16th century and serves today as a monastery church. Close to the shopping district, it serves as a place of rest even to visitors who are not religious. With an organ completed in 2008, it is a major venue for church music events.

== History ==
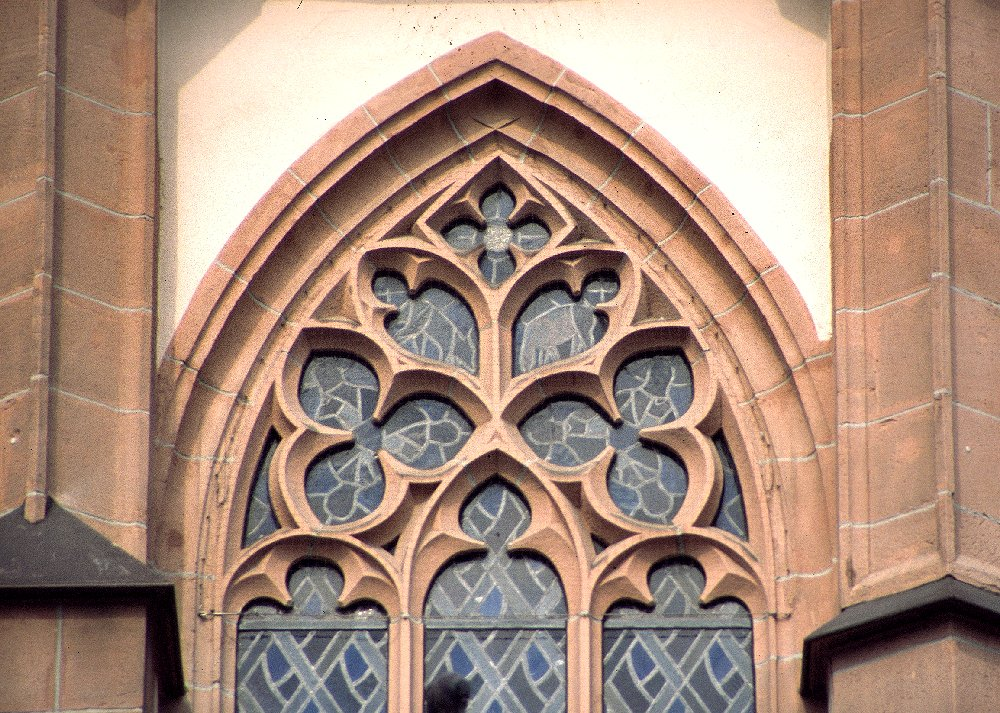
Window

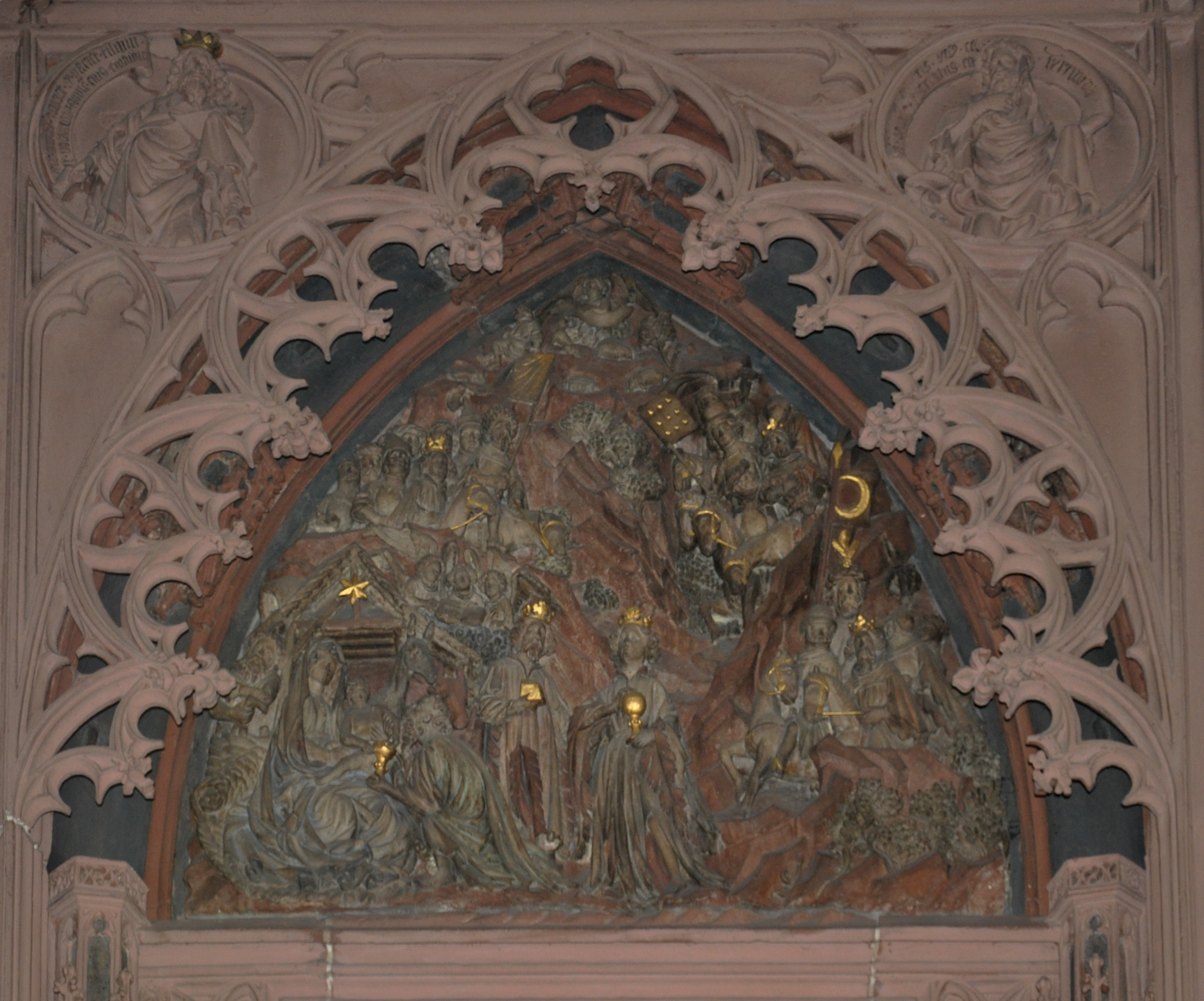
The tympanum of the Adoration

The first sacred building on the site began as a family chapel, which was made in 1325 a collegiate church by the archbishop of Mainz, Matthias von Buchegg, dedicated to Mary ("Unsere liebe Frau"). It was the third collegiate in the town, after that of St. Bartholomew attached to the Frankfurt Cathedral, and St. Leonhard, founded in 1317.

In 1344 the chapel was expanded to a Gothic hall church of three naves. A document about its consecration mentions two altars. From 1415, the south facade was transformed, including a tympanum showing the Adoration of the Magi made by the workshop of Madern Gerthener. In 1453 the town council permitted to change an adjacent tower of the fortification to a bell tower. From 1506 to 1509 the church was once more expanded, by Jörg Östereicher. The church remained Catholic, part of the Diocese of Mainz, even when the Reformation was introduced in Frankfurt in 1533.

The church was partly changed to Baroque style from 1763 to 1771. The helmet of the tower was replaced by the one still seen today. The interior was changed almost completely, installing five new altars and a chancel from Mainz workshops. An organ by the Frankfurt organ builder Ernst Weegmann was built at around the same time, installed in 1763.

With the secularisation in 1803, Frankfurt became the owner of the church. Friedrich Rumpf built in 1824 a new entrance protecting the tympanum. A Walcker organ was installed in 1864. From 1923, Capuchins became the spiritual leaders, who built a convent north of the church. The church was completely destroyed by bombing in World War II in 1944. Only fragments of the high altar and statue of Mary could be saved. The church was restored in the 1950s, but in a simplified form, replacing the Gothic vaults by wooden ceilings.

== Church music ==
A new organ was completed in 2008 by Karl Göckel, with 57 stops (3,370 pipes) on three manuals and pedal. It is especially suited to play both works of the German Romantic period as the French symphonic style. It can be played also from a second keyboard close to the altar, serving music with choir.

Peter Reulein has been the church musician from 2000, directing a vocal ensemble, the choir Collegium Vocale, the orchestra Collegium Musicum and the youth choir Capuccinis.

== Spiritual life ==
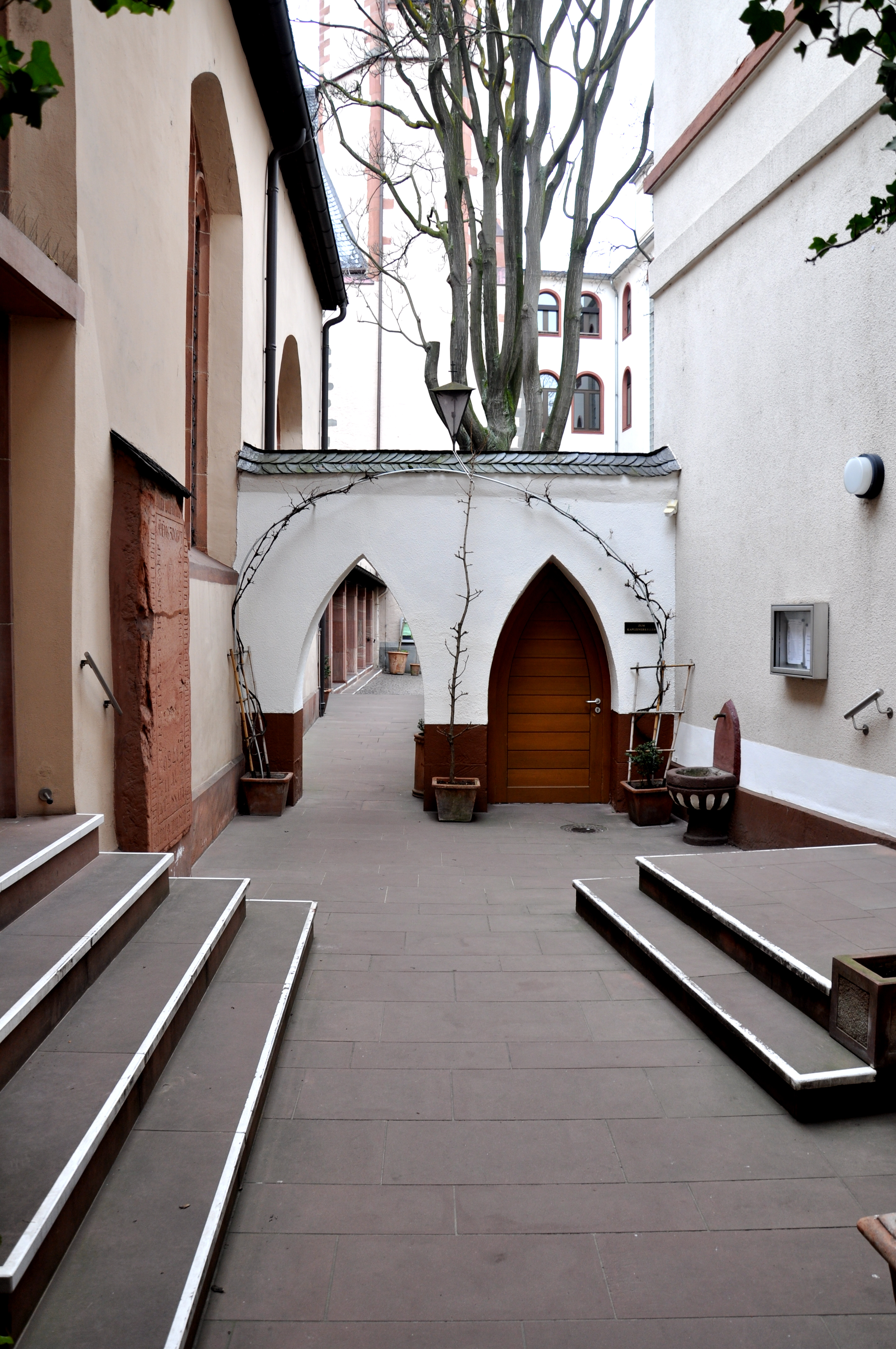
Interior court

Until 31 December 2013, the church was both a monastery church of Capuchin monks and a parish church. Then it became a "Kloster- und Rektoratskirche" without its own parish". It has developed to a spiritual centre of the Rhein-Main Region. It is open daily from 6 am to around 10 pm. The Capuchins offer breakfast to homeless people.

Regular services are every day three masses, lauds (morning praise), a prayer at noon (10 minutes of music, spiritual impulse and prayer) and vespers (evening praise), with additional masses on the weekend.
