= Gabriel Dessauer =

German cantor, concert organist and academic

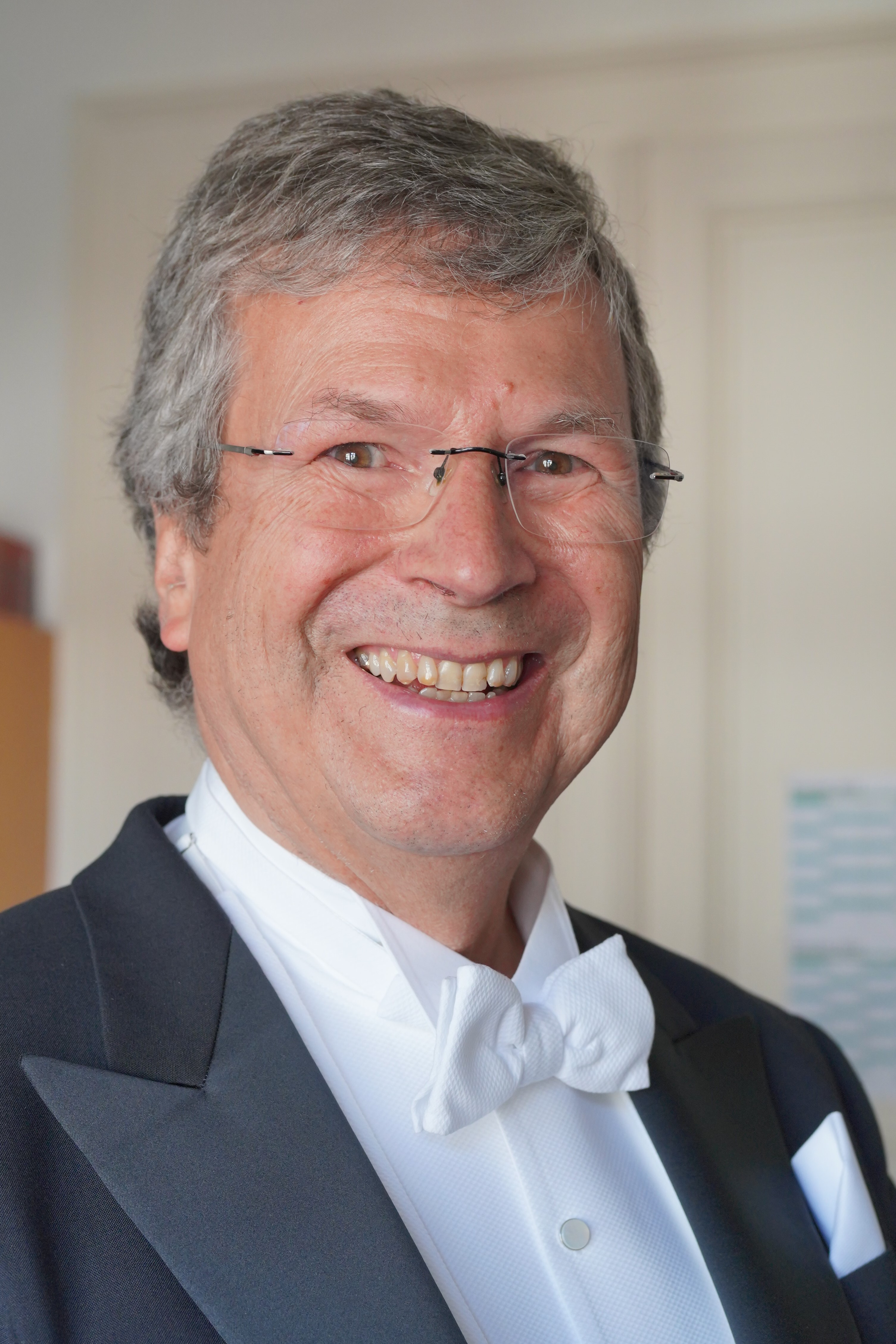
- Dessauer in 2022
- Born: 4 December 1955 (age 70); Würzburg, West Germany
- Education: Richard Strauss Conservatory; Musikhochschule München
- Occupations: Kantor; Concert organist; Academic teacher
- Organizations: St. Bonifatius, Wiesbaden; Reger-Chor; Hochschule für Musik Mainz

Gabriel Dessauer (born 4 December 1955) is a German Kantor, concert organist, and academic teacher. After studies with Diethard Hellmann and Franz Lehrndorfer, he was responsible for the church music at St. Bonifatius, Wiesbaden, from 1981 to 2021, conducting the Chor von St. Bonifatius until 2018. Besides normal church services, he conducted them in regular masses with soloists and orchestra for Christmas and Easter and a yearly concert. In 1995 he prepared the choir for a memorial concert commemorating the 50th anniversary of the end of World War II, performing Britten's War Requiem with choirs from countries involved in the war, and concerts in Wiesbaden and Macon, Georgia. Programs of choral concerts included Hermann Suter's Le Laudi in 1998, the German premiere of Rutter's Mass of the Children in 2004, and the world premiere of Colin Mawby's Bonifatiusmess in 2012 which he had commissioned for the choir's 150th anniversary. The concert of 2008, Vivaldi's Gloria and Haydn's Nelson Mass, was also performed at San Paolo dentro le Mura in Rome.

In 1985 Dessauer founded a project choir, later named Reger-Chor, dedicated to rarely performed sacred music for choir and organ. It developed into a German-Belgian collaboration, with regular concerts at the St. Salvator's Cathedral in Bruges.

Dessauer is an internationally-known organ recitalist. He has lectured at international conferences, especially about the music of Max Reger, who was a member of the St. Bonifatius parish. He was an organ teacher on the faculty of the Hochschule für Musik Mainz from 1995 to 2013.

== Career ==
Dessauer was born in Würzburg on 4 December 1955, the son of Guido Dessauer and his wife Gabrielle. He achieved his Abitur at the Kolleg St. Blasien in 1974. He then studied church music at the Richard-Strauss-Konservatorium in Munich for a year, studying organ with Elmar Schloter. He was a member of Karl Richter's Münchener Bach-Chor. From 1975 to 1980, he studied church music and concert organ at the Musikhochschule München with Diethard Hellmann and Klemens Schnorr, graduating with a concert exam. He continued his studies with Franz Lehrndorfer and received the Meisterklassendiplom (master class diploma) in 1982.

Dessauer was the organist for services at the Kolleg St. Blasien from 1971 to 1974, followed by one year as organist at the Akademie Tutzing and choral conductor at the Protestant parish in Tutzing. From 1975 to 1981 he was cantor of St. Andreas in Munich.

=== Church music at St. Bonifatius, Wiesbaden ===
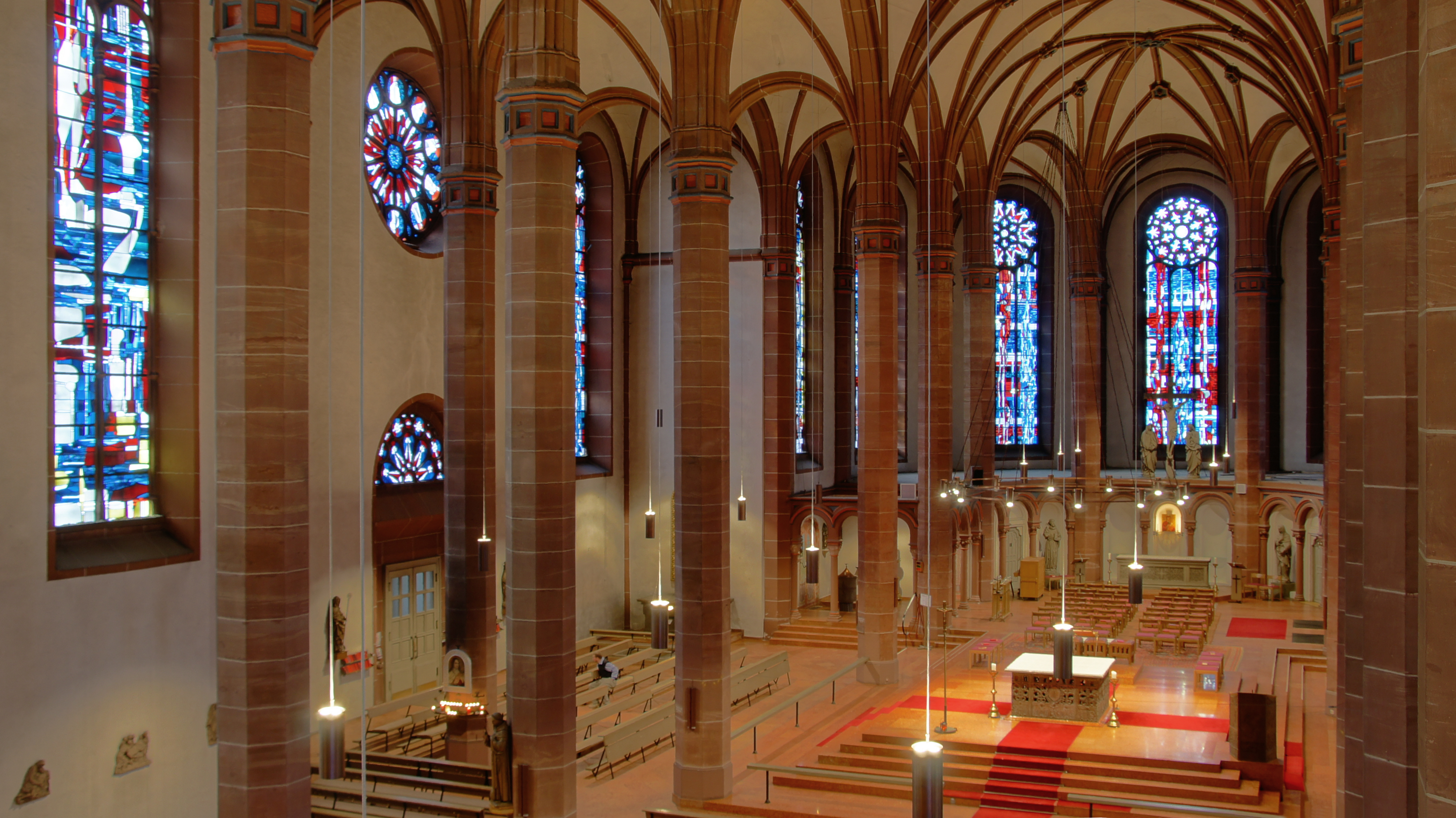
St. Bonifatius, Wiesbaden, interior from the organ loft, photograph by Dessauer

Dessauer was responsible for church music as both organist and choral conductor at St. Bonifatius, Wiesbaden, the central Catholic church in the capital of Hesse, from 1981. He was the conductor of the Chor von St. Bonifatius, founded in 1862, of the children's choir and of the Schola for Gregorian chant. He conducted the church choir in services, including regular orchestral masses by Haydn, Mozart, Beethoven, and Schubert for Christmas and Easter, accompanied by members of the orchestra of the Hessisches Staatstheater Wiesbaden, with soloists from the Hochschule für Musik Mainz such as Andreas Karasiak and students. In 2011 they performed the Mass No. 1 in B♭ major by Johann Nepomuk Hummel, and in 2012 Hans Leo Hassler's Missa super Dixit Maria. On Dessauer's initiative, the organ built in 1954 was refurbished by Hugo Mayer Orgelbau in 1985.

==== Choral concerts ====
Every year, typically on 3 October, German Unity Day, Dessauer conducted choral concerts of works such as Mendelssohn's Elias, Ein deutsches Requiem by Brahms, and Verdi's Messa da Requiem. Both choir and children's choir appeared in performances of Hermann Suter's Le Laudi (1998 and 2007), and in the German premiere of John Rutter's Mass of the Children in 2004. In 2006, Dessauer conducted the 2004 Requiem by Karl Jenkins.

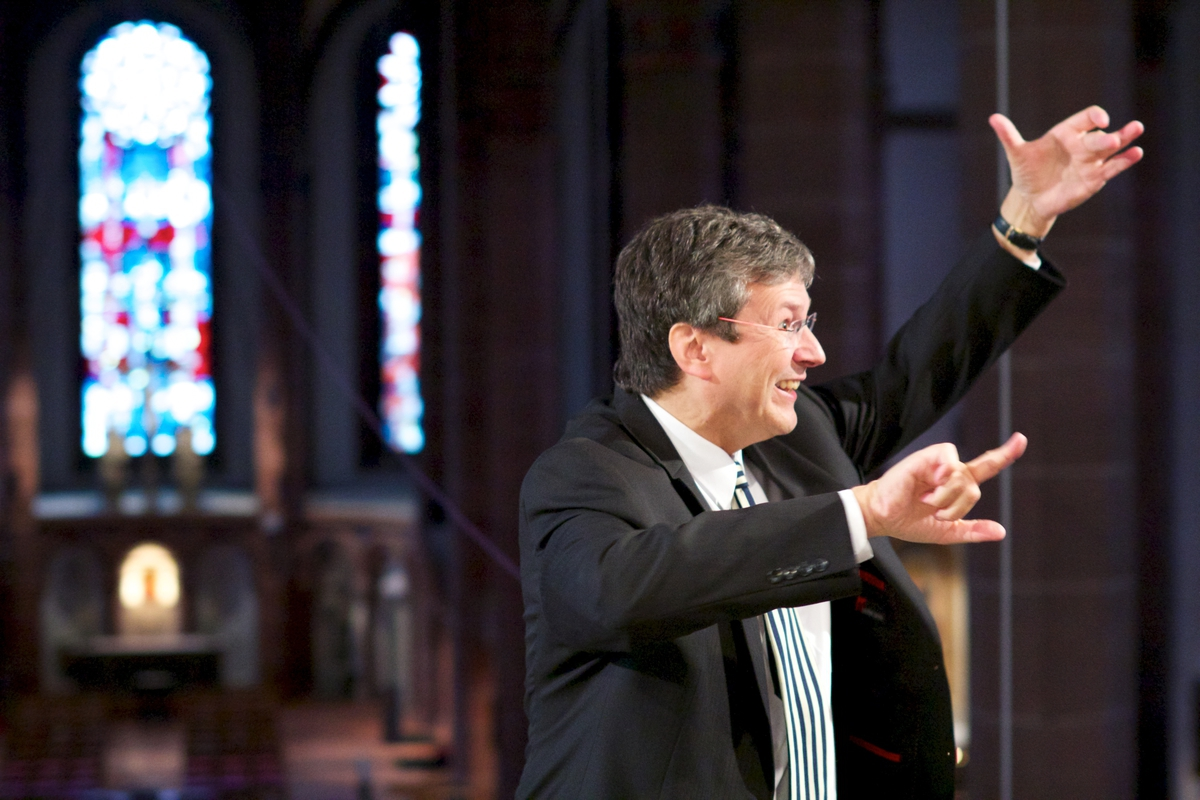
Dessauer conducting the Chor von St. Bonifatius, 2012

In 2010, he chose works by Bach, including his Mass in G minor and choral movements from cantatas BWV 140, BWV 12, BWV 120 and Wir danken dir, Gott, wir danken dir, BWV 29. In 2011 he conducted Haydn's Die Schöpfung. The children's choir sang along with the soprano.

To celebrate the 150th anniversary of the choir in 2012, Dessauer commissioned Colin Mawby to compose the Missa solemnis Bonifatius-Messe. Mawby wrote the mass in 2011 for the forces available at the church (soprano, choir, children's choir, oboe and organ), and the work was premiered on 3 October 2012. The organist was Ignace Michiels from St. Salvator's Cathedral in Bruges, soprano Natascha Jung, and oboist Leonie Dessauer. A second performance took place on 3 November at the Frankfurt Cathedral, with cathedral organist Andreas Boltz. In 2013 Dessauer performed Schubert's Mass No. 6 along with his Unfinished Symphony. The concert of 2014 was John Rutter's Magnificat.

==== Other concerts at St. Bonifatius ====
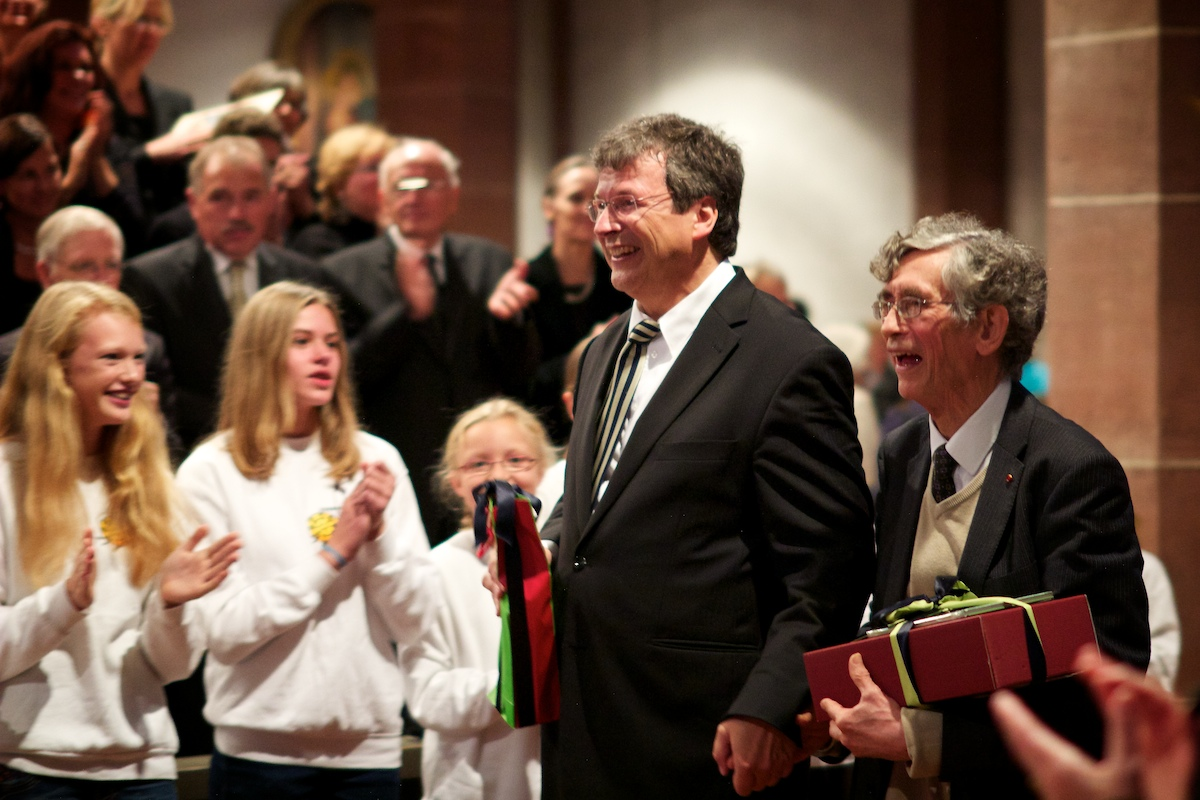
Dessauer and Colin Mawby after the premiere of the Bonifatius-Messe on 3 October 2012

Dessauer first continued the tradition of a monthly concert Stunde der Kirchenmusik (Hour of church music). He later began instead a series Boni-Musikwochen, grouping choral and organ concerts around a theme within the span of one to two weeks. The 2010 Musikwochen 2010, Reger und mehr ("Reger and more"), presented concerts given by Kent Tritle and Ignace Michiels, among others.

==== Choral concerts abroad ====
Dessauer travelled for concerts with the choir, in 1986 to in Azkoitia and San Sebastián, with Cavaillé-Coll-organs in both churches. They performed at the Limburg Cathedral in 1987. In 1990, during German reunification, they travelled to Görlitz, Wiesbaden's sister-city in East Germany, to perform together with the choir of St. Jakobus, Görlitz. In 1996 they performed in Memphis, Tennessee and Macon, Georgia, returning the 1945 visit of the Macon Civic Chorale for Britten's War Requiem. They appeared in Rome in 2008, repeating the yearly concert of Vivaldi's Gloria and Haydn's Nelson Mass at San Paolo dentro le Mura in concert, and singing during mass at St. Peter's Basilica.

=== Organ recitals ===
Dessauer has appeared in recitals in Europe and the U.S., at the Washington National Cathedral and St. Patrick's Cathedral, New York. He played the Kotzschmar organ at the Merrill Auditorium in Portland, Maine, and in the Cathedral of Our Lady of the Angels in Los Angeles. In 2004, he lectured at the National Convention of the American Guild of Organists in Los Angeles on the choral music of Max Reger, who was a member of the parish of St. Bonifatius while he studied and lived in Wiesbaden. In 2005, Dessauer played at the Spreckels Organ Pavilion in San Diego. In 2010, he gave a recital at St. Ignatius Loyola, New York.

Since 1992, Dessauer conducted events for the Rheingau Musik Festival called the Orgeltour (organ tour), visiting historic organs in the region. The first tours covered historic organs of the Rheingau; later ones extended to the cathedrals of Worms and Speyer, Würzburg, and Fulda.

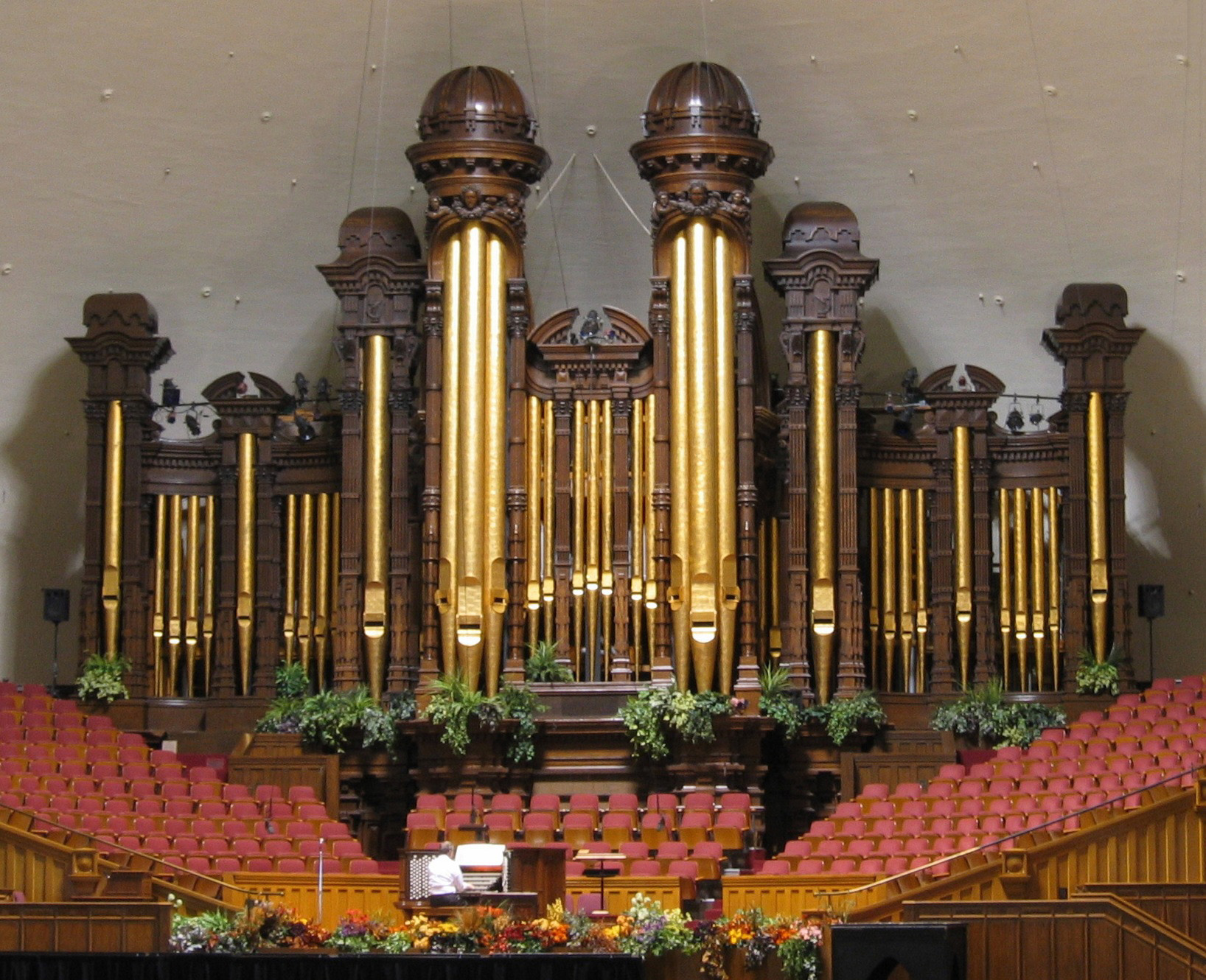
Salt Lake Tabernacle organ in Salt Lake City

Until 2010, Dessauer played a regular concert on New Year's Eve on the Walcker organ at the Marktkirche, Wiesbaden, together with church organist Hans Uwe Hielscher. To celebrate the bicentenary of Franz Liszt's birth in 2011, he played three major organ works by the composer on instruments that were built around the time of the compositions, Fantasy and Fugue on the Theme B-A-C-H, Variations on Bach's "Weinen, Klagen" (1863), and Fantasy and Fugue on the chorale Ad nos ad salutarem undam.

In 2014, Dessauer toured in the US, playing concerts at the Washington National Cathedral, at St. Mary's Cathedral in San Francisco, California, and at the Salt Lake Tabernacle organ in Salt Lake City. He toured the U.S. five times.

In 2020, Dessauer organised the Winterspiele concert series to honour the 150th anniversary of Louis Vierne, playing his Third Organ Symphony, among others, in the summer instead of winter because the planned concert was cancelled due to te COVID-19 pandemic.

Dessauer retired at the end of 2021, succeeded by Johannes Schröder.

=== Teaching ===
From 1995 to 2013, Dessauer lecture organ at the Hochschule für Musik Mainz, part of the Gutenberg University in Mainz.

=== Reger-Chor ===
In 1985, Dessauer invited singers to form a choir to perform a single work, the Hebbel-Requiem by Max Reger in the organ version by the Munich organist and composer Max Beckschäfer. The name Reger-Chor was chosen in 1988, when the next project was dedicated to the German premiere of Joseph Jongen's Missa, Op. 111. In 1990 they presented one of the first performances in Germany of Rutter's Requiem, which was recorded on CD.

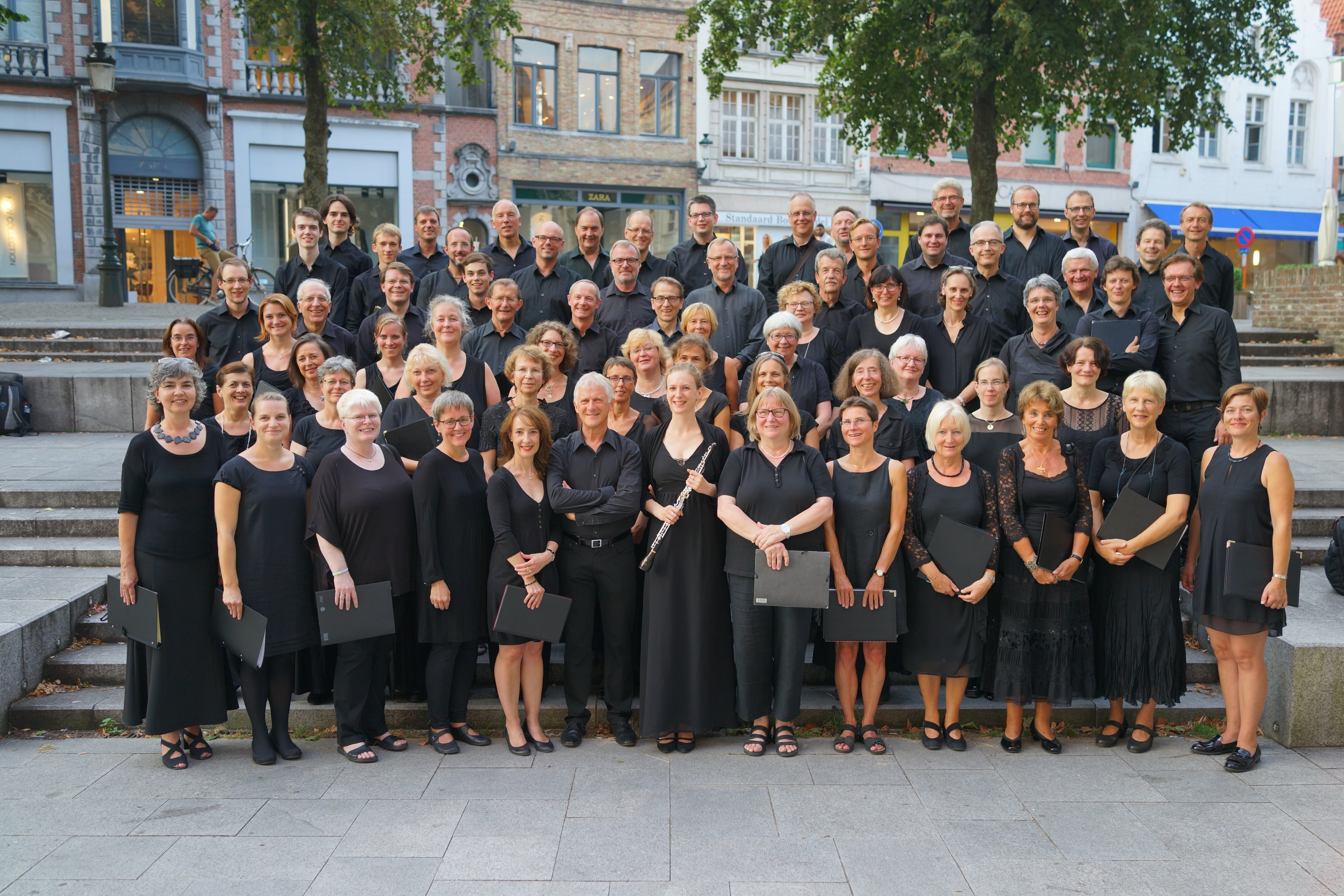
Reger-Chor with singers from Germany and Belgium near Bruges Cathedral, 2016

In 2001 an international collaboration began with the organist Ignace Michiels, organist of St. Salvator's Cathedral in Bruges, bringing together singers from Flanders and the Rhein-Main Region to perform an annual concert both in Germany and Belgium. In 2003 Dessauer conducted the premiere of the organ version of Reger's Der 100. Psalm by François Callebout.

In addition to works by Reger, Dessauer chose rarely-performed church music by composers such as Herbert Howells, Benjamin Britten, Herbert Sumsion, Maurice Duruflé, Edward Elgar, Frederick Delius, William Lloyd Webber, Jules Van Nuffel, Joseph Ryelandt, Andrew Carter, Kurt Hessenberg, Rupert Lang, Morten Lauridsen, and Eric Whitacre. In 2015 he conducted Bach's Missa of 1733 in B-minor in the newly-edited parts for the Dresden court, with members of the orchestra of the Hessisches Staatstheater Wiesbaden.

=== Choral projects ===
In 1999 Dessauer collaborated with Michiels in a joint project to bring a century of violence to a close. The same program was performed in both Bruges and Wiesbaden by the Cantores and Chor von St. Bonifatius choirs, with Michiels playing the organ and Dessauer conducting. The concert in Bruges on 23 October 1999 was named Eeuw van zinloos Geweld (Century of meaningless violence) and expressed it using Maurice Duruflé's Prélude et Fugue sur le nom d'Alain, Jules Van Nuffel's In convertendo Dominus, Jehan Alain's Litanies, Rudolf Mauersberger's Wie liegt die Stadt so wüst, Gerald Hendrie's Exsultate from the sonata In praise of reconciliation, and Duruflé's Requiem. The Wiesbaden concert was called Versöhnungskonzert zum Ende des Jahrhunderts (Concert of reconciliation at the end of the century).

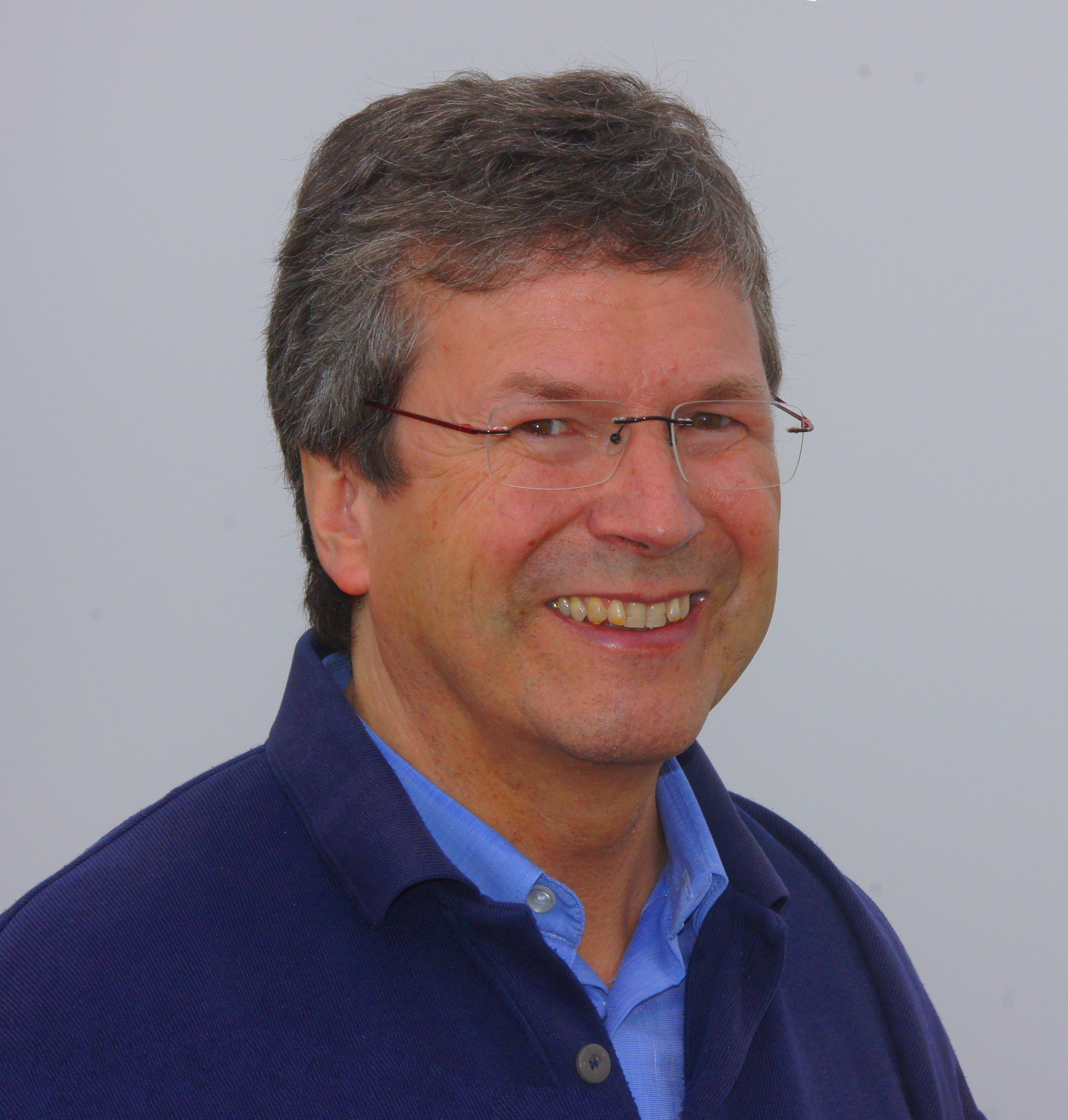
Dessauer in 2011

In 1995 Dessauer prepared the choir for a memorial concert commemorating the 50th anniversary of the end of World War II; on 8 May 1995, Britten's War Requiem was performed in a ceremony of the government of Hesse at the Kurhaus Wiesbaden, with choirs from countries who were opponents during the war: the Swindon Choral Society from Swindon, UK, the Macon Civic Chorale from Macon, Georgia, and the Schiersteiner Kantorei conducted by Martin Lutz who conducted the concert. A year later they took part in a performance of the work with similar forces in Macon.

In November 2009 Dessauer performed Duruflé's Requiem again, this time with a choir of volunteers who wanted to commemorate the Holocaust in a concert against antisemitism. Janina Moeller sang the mezzo-soprano solo, and Petra Morath-Pusinelli was the organist.

In November 2015 Dessauer was the organist for a sing-along organised by the Diocese of Limburg in St. Bonifatius. A choir of 150 volunteers studied Gabriel Fauré's Requiem and performed it as part of the Wiesbadener Bachwochen festival. As a contrast, Dessauer performed Olivier Latry's Salve Regina organ meditations, in which, according to a reviewer, he made the listener feel "...the complete cosmos of humanity, including the cruelty and violence, from which this prayer asks for salvation from" ("den gesamten Kosmos des Menschlichen nachempfinden ließ, einschließlich der Grausamkeit und Gewalt, aus der in diesem Gebet um Errettung gebeten wird").

== Recordings ==
Dessauer recorded both choral works and organ music with the Mayer organ of St. Bonifatius, including:

- 1986 Vierne: Organ Symphony No. 2 (LP)
- 1990 Rutter: Requiem, motets by Reger, Reubke's Sonata on the 94th Psalm, Reger-Chor, Monika Fuhrmann (soprano), instrumentalists, organist (Rutter): Petra Morath, organist (Reubke) and conductor Gabriel Dessauer (1990, recorded live in St. Bonifatius Wiesbaden)
- 1993 Brahms: Ein deutsches Requiem
- 1994 Orgel-Feuerwerk I (works by Lemare, Vierne, Liszt. Schumann, Jongen)
- 1995 Kontraste (works by Vierne, Höller, Tournemire, Ogden, Glass)
- 1996 Verdi: Requiem
- 1997 Romantische Orgelkonzerte, Marco Enrico Bossi: Organ concerto in A minor, Op. 100, Josef Gabriel Rheinberger: Organ Concerto in G minor, Op. 177, Léon Boëllmann: Suite Gothique, Op. 25, Kammerphilharmonie Rhein-Main, conductor: Jürgen Bruns
- 1999: Suter: Le Laudi, Zofia Kilanowicz, Pamela Pantos, Andreas Karasiak, Johann Werner Prein, Chor von St. Bonifatius, Kinderchor von St. Bonifatius, Witold Lutoslawski Philharmonic Wroclaw, 1999
- 1999 Orgel-Feuerwerk II ( Widor, Van Hulse, Mozart, Gárdonyi, Lloyd Webber, Joplin, Franck, Reger)
- 2001: Reger: Hebbel-Requiem, organ works, Reger-Chor-International, conductor Gabriel Dessauer (2001, recorded live in St. Bonifatius Wiesbaden)
- 2003: Reger: Der 100. Psalm, Introduction, Passacaglia and Fugue, Op. 127, Reger-Chor-International, conductor Gabriel Dessauer (recorded live in St. Bonifatius Wiesbaden)
- Orgel-Feuerwerk III to V
- Just for Fun, Organ Historical Society Catalog
