= Reger-Chor =

German-Belgian choir

- Choir
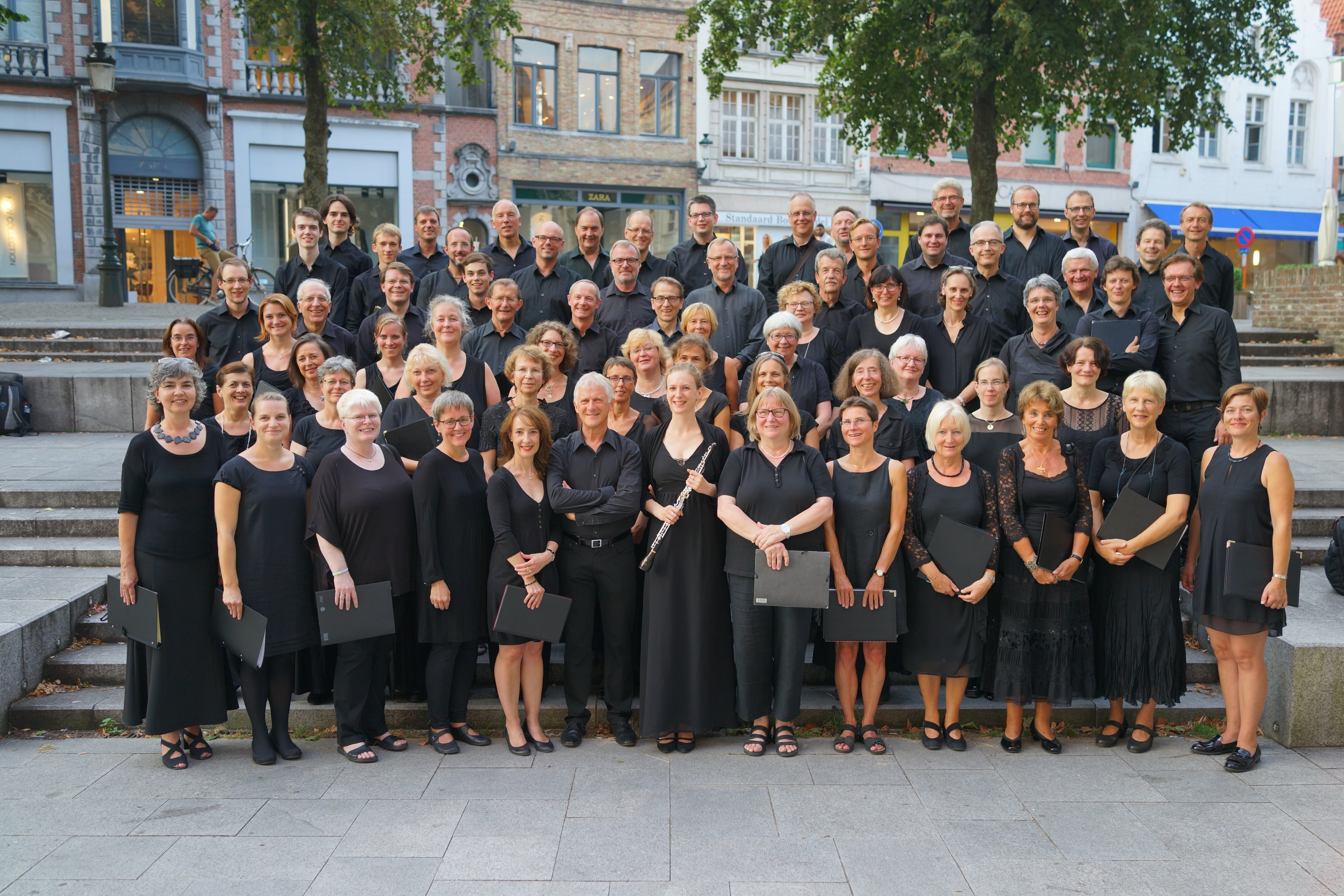
- Singers from Germany and Belgium facing the Bruges Cathedral before a concert of Reger's Der 100. Psalm on 27 August 2016
- Origin: Wiesbaden
- Founded: 1985
- Genre: Mixed project choir
- Organist: Ignace Michiels
- Chief conductor: Gabriel Dessauer
- Website: www.bonifatius-wiesbaden.de/kirchenmusik/regerchor

The Reger-Chor is a German-Belgian choir. It was founded in Wiesbaden in 1985 and has been conducted by Gabriel Dessauer in Wiesbaden. Since 2001 it has grown to Regerchor-International in a collaboration with the organist Ignace Michiels of the St. Salvator's Cathedral of Bruges. The choir performs an annual concert both in Germany and Belgium of mostly sacred choral music for choir and organ. Concerts have taken place regularly in St. Bonifatius, Wiesbaden, and in the cathedral of Bruges in its series "Kathedraalconcerten". The choir performed additional concerts at other churches of the two countries and in the Concertgebouw of Bruges.

== History ==
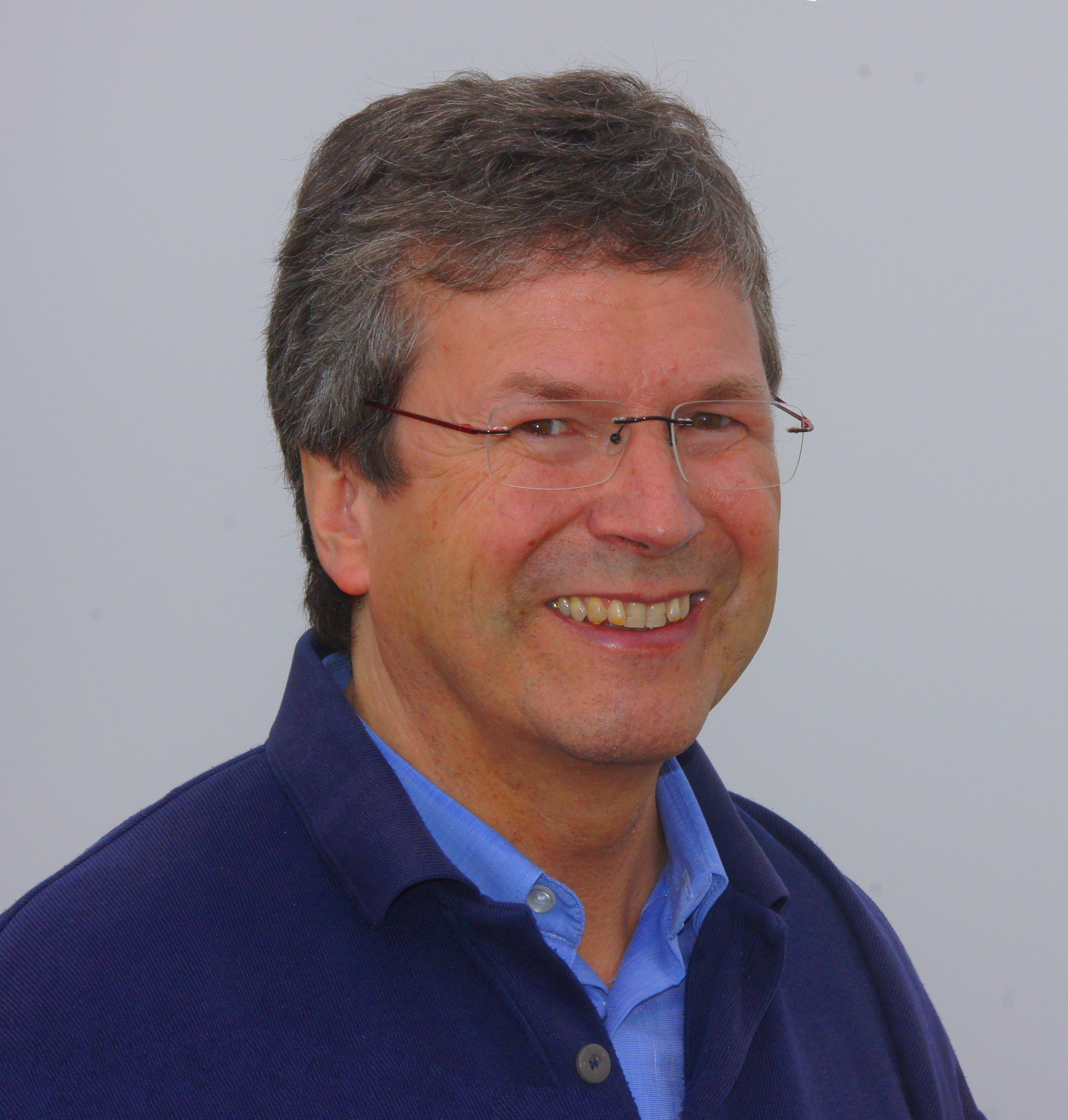
Gabriel Dessauer, 2011

Gabriel Dessauer (born 1955) was cantor of St. Bonifatius, Wiesbaden, since 1981. In 1985 he called singers together to form a choir in order to perform a single work, the Hebbel-Requiem of Max Reger in the organ version of the Munich organist and composer Max Beckschäfer.

Marktkirche Wiesbaden

The concert on 16 October 1985 was part of the Internationale Orgelkonzerte Wiesbaden, with concerts of Roger Fisher, Judit Hajdók and Maurice Clerc, among others, on the Walcker organ of the Marktkirche in Wiesbaden, which Max Reger had played himself when he had lived there starting in 1891. Gabriel Dessauer conducted the choir, Beckschäfer was the organist. He also played his arrangement for organ of Reger's Die Toteninsel, part of Vier Tondichtungen nach A. Böcklin. The concert is considered the foundation of the Reger-Chor.

The name was chosen in 1988, when the next project was dedicated to the German premiere of Joseph Jongen's Missa op. 111. Later projects included one of the first performances in Germany of Rutter's Requiem, recorded on the first CD of the Reger-Chor in 1990.

In 2001 an international collaboration began with the organist Ignace Michiels, bringing together an almost equal number of singers from Flanders and the Rhein-Main Region to perform an annual concert both in Germany and Belgium.

== Projects ==
1988

The choir sang the German premiere of Joseph Jongen's Mass for choir, brass ensemble and organ, Op. 130, which was not yet in print then, both in the Stiftskirche of Aschaffenburg and in St. Bonifatius.

1989

On 15 January the choir performed Henry Purcell's anthems Remember not, Lord, our offences and Hear my prayer, O Lord, Magnificat for St Paul's by Herbert Howells, Benjamin Britten's Te Deum in C and Herbert Sumsion's In Exile, with organist Petra Morath. On 14 July 1989 the choir sang Bach's Missa in G minor in St. Bonifatius with the Kammerorchester Marburg.

1990

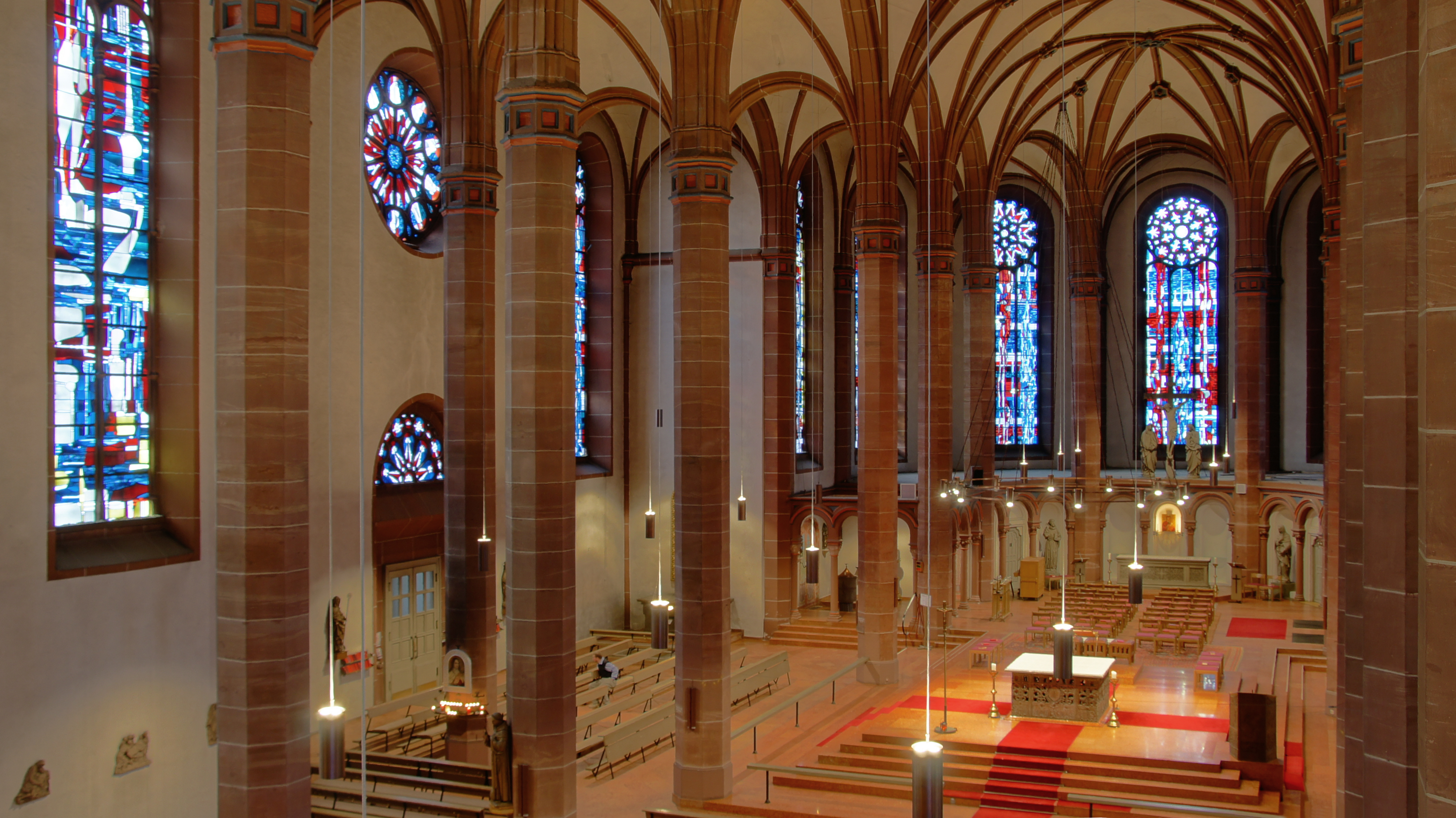
St. Bonifatius, interior from the organ loft

On 1 November 1990 the choir sang in St. Bonifatius Reger's motets Der Mensch lebt und bestehet and Nachtlied from Acht geistliche Gesänge, op. 138, and Rutter's Requiem in the version for chamber ensemble. The concert was recorded on CD, the choir positioned "mixed", no two singers of a voice part next to each other, to improve homogeneity.

1992

On 16 June 1992, commemorating the 80th birthday of Maurice Duruflé, the choir sang in St. Bonifatius his Requiem in the organ version, with alto Laetitia Henke-Cropp and organist Petra Morath. Gabriel Dessauer played Duruflé's Suite op. 5.

1998

On 11 January 1998 the choir sang secular choral music in the hall of St. Bonifatius, accompanied by Petra Kristen, piano: Edward Elgar's From the Bavarian Highlands op. 27, the first of "Two Songs to be sung of a summer night on the water" by Frederick Delius, Rutter's Five Childhood Lyrics, and the Zigeunerlieder, op. 103, by Brahms. The songs of Rutter were performed also on 24 January at a workshop for choral conductors which the composer conducted in Limburg, introducing his Magnificat. He first listened and then conducted the music himself.

2001

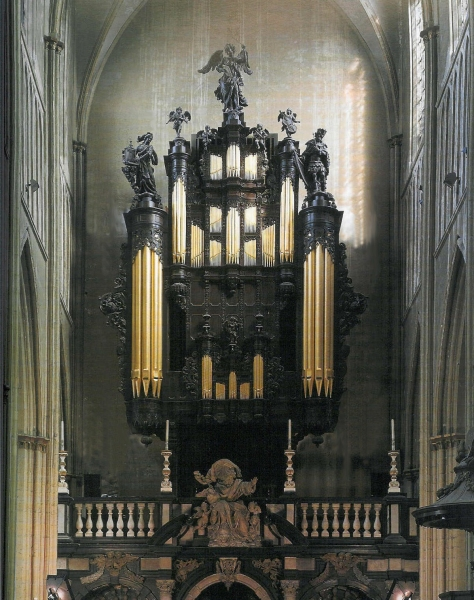
Organ of Sint-Salvatorskathedraal

The first concerts of the Regerchor-International were performed in St. Salvator and in St. Bonifatius. the choral part of the program was William Lloyd Webber's Missa Sanctae Mariae Magdalenae, Jules Van Nuffel's psalm Dominus regnavit, and again Reger's Requiem. The concert in Wiesbaden was recorded.

2002

The choir sang concerts in St. Salvator and St. Bonifatius, the choral part of the program was Joseph Ryelandt's Missa quatuor vocibus mixtis cum organo op. 84 and Kodaly's Laudes organi. Bruges was European Capital of Culture that year, therefore music was performed of a composer who had been affiliated with the city for life.

2003

The choir premiered in concerts in St. Bonifatius and St. Salvator the organ version of Reger's Der 100. Psalm of François Callebout.

2004

The choir sang in St. Salvator and St. Bonifatius sacred works for choir and organ of Van Nuffel, including In convertendo Dominus, and Reger's Nachtlied.

2006

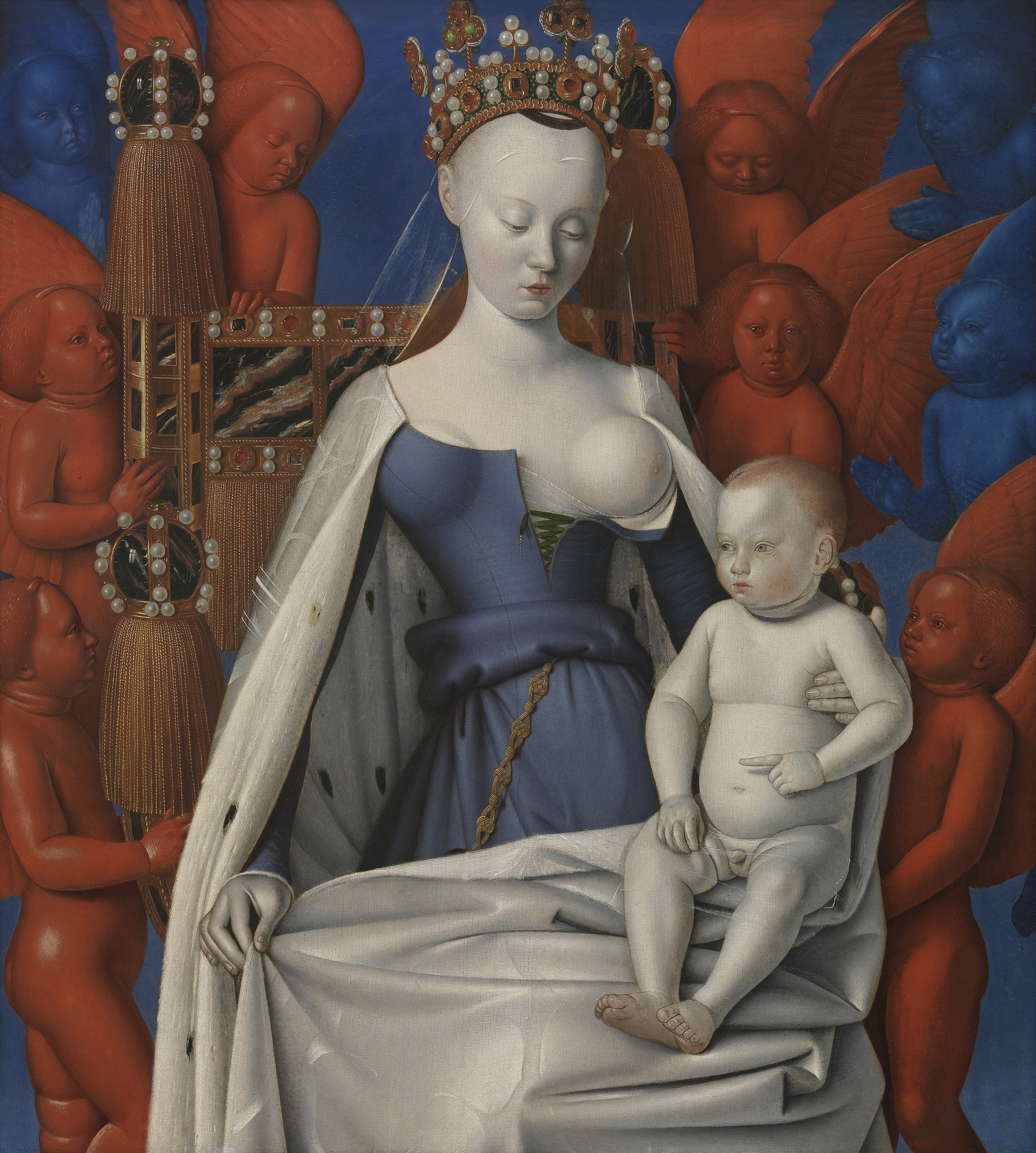
Concert poster for Bach: Jean Fouquet, Madonna and Child, c. 1450.

The choir performed both in St. Leonhard, Frankfurt, and in St. Bonifatius choral music from England, Magnificat and Nunc dimittis for Gloucester Cathedral by Herbert Howells, Herbert Sumsions They That Go Down to the Sea in Ships and In Exile, and three movements from Andrew Carter's Benedicite.
On 2 December 2006 Ignace Michiels conducted the choir in Bach's Christmas Oratorio, performed in the Concertgebouw.

2007

As part of the Boni-Musikwochen 2007 in St. Bonifatius, celebrating Das Jahr des Historizismus, the choir sang on 15 Juli 2007 Ryelandt's Missa six vocibus op. 111 and Kurt Hessenberg's O Herr, mache mich zum Werkzeug deines Friedens op. 37/1, after the Prayer of Saint Francis. The program was repeated at Sint-Pieters in Oostkamp on 2 August 2007.

2008

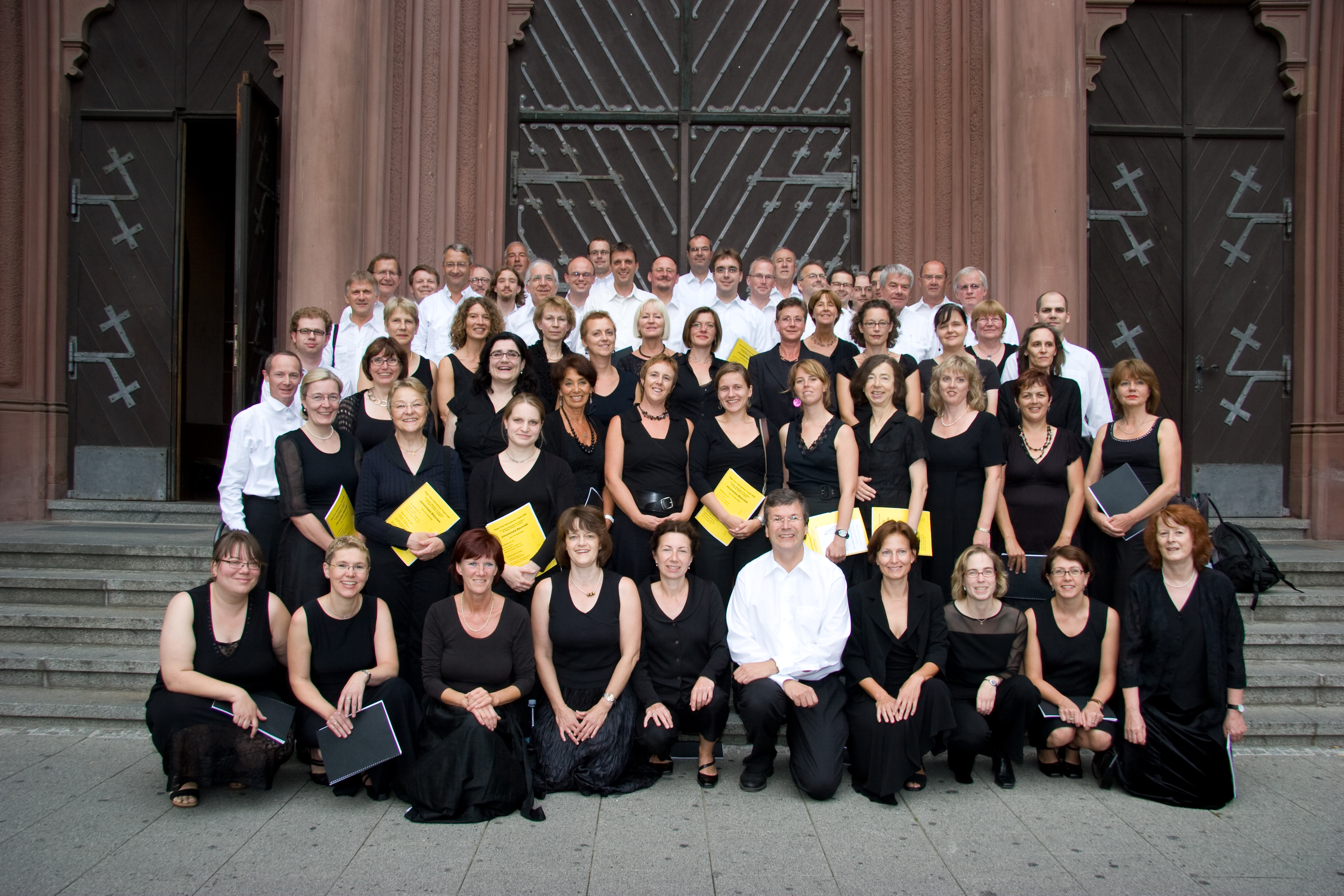
The choir in front of St. Bonifatius, Wiesbaden, 2008

As part of the Boni-Musikwochen 2008 in St. Bonifatius, celebrating the 175th birthday of Brahms, the choir sang three motets op. 110, Geistliches Lied op. 30, and Fest- und Gedenksprüche op. 109. The program was repeated at the Heilig Hart Kerk in Knokke.

2009

As part of the Boni-Musikwochen 2009 in St. Bonifatius the choir performed choral music from North America, Rupert Lang's Earth teach me on words of the Ute people, Morten Lauridsen's O magnum mysterium, Eric Whitacre's Lux Aurumque, and Moses Hogan's Elijah Rock and Joshua Fit the Battle of Jericho.

2010

Celebrating 25 years, the choir performed as part of the Boni-Musikwochen 2010 in St. Bonifatius the last movement of Bach's congratulatory cantata BWV 134a, Van Nuffel's In convertendo Dominus, the Gloria from Ryelandt's Missa op. 84 and Reger's Hebbel-Requiem. The program was performed on 4 September 2010 in St. Salvator as the final concert of the Kathedraalconcerten 2010.

2011

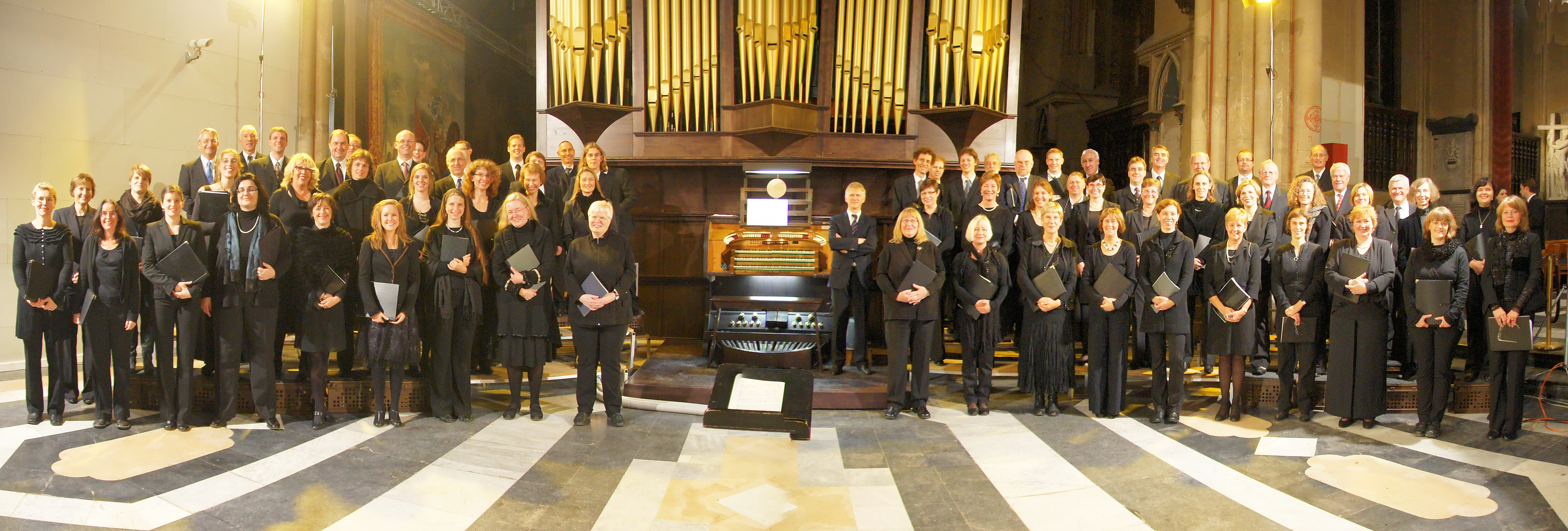
Reger-Chor, St. Salvator's Cathedral, Bruges, Brahms Ein deutsches Requiem, 2011

On 5 November, the choir performed Ein deutsches Requiem by Johannes Brahms in an organ version at St. Salvator. Ignace Michiels began the concert with an organ version of Mendelssohn's Variations sérieuses and an arrangement of Liszt's St. François de Paule marchant sur les flots from Deux légendes (1862). The same program was performed in Wiesbaden on 12 November.

2012

The project of 2012 was Gabriel Fauré's Requiem. combined with Bach's Der Geist hilft unser Schwachheit auf, BWV 226.

2015

For the 30th anniversary, Bach's Missa of 1733 was chosen, performed with soloists and members of the Hessisches Staatsorchester.

2016

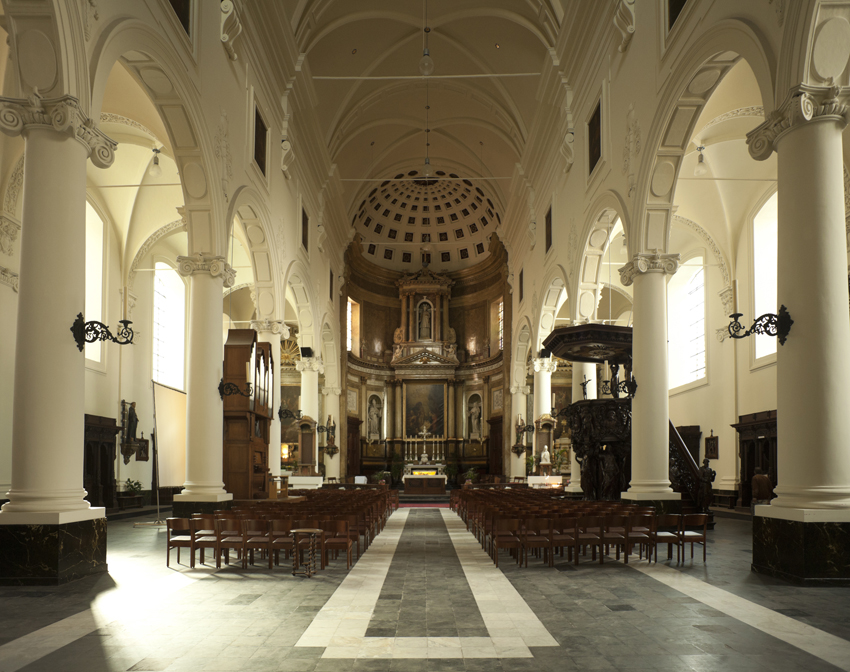
St. Stefanus, Ghent, 2017

The choir remembered Reger's centenary of death by another performance of Der 100. Psalm. A concert on 27 August 2016 at the Bruges Cathedral combined Bach's Concerto in A major, BWV 1055, played in an organ version by Leonie Dessauer on an oboe d'amore and Ignace Michiels, who also performed Reger's organ works Scherzo, from Zwölf Stücke, Op. 65/2, and Perpetuum mobile, from Zwölf Stücke, Op. 80/2. The choir also sang two works by Belgian composers, Van Nuffels psalm setting Laetatus sum and Joseph Ryelandt's Panem de coelo. It was the closing concert of the Kathedraalfestival Brugge 2016.

2017

In the Martin Luther Year, the choir performed again Der 100. Psalm, in the church St. Stefanus in Ghent, a sister city of Wiesbaden. Michiels performed in the concert on 5 November on the Forrest organ also works by Guilmant, Dupré, Dubois and Widor. The encore was Reger's "Die Nacht ist kommen" from Acht geistliche Gesänge, Op. 138.

== Recordings ==
- John Rutter: Requiem, motets of Reger, Reubke's Sonata on the 94th Psalm, Reger-Chor, Monika Fuhrmann (soprano), instrumentalists, organist (Rutter): Petra Morath, organist (Reubke) and conductor Gabriel Dessauer (1990, recorded live in St. Bonifatius Wiesbaden)
- Max Reger: Hebbel-Requiem, organ works, Regerchor-International, conductor Gabriel Dessauer (2001, recorded live in St. Bonifatius Wiesbaden)
- Max Reger: Der 100. Psalm, Introduction, Passacaglia and Fugue in E minor op. 127, Regerchor-International, conductor Gabriel Dessauer (2003, recorded live in St. Bonifatius Wiesbaden)
