= Ignace Michiels =

Belgian organist & choral conductor (born 1963)

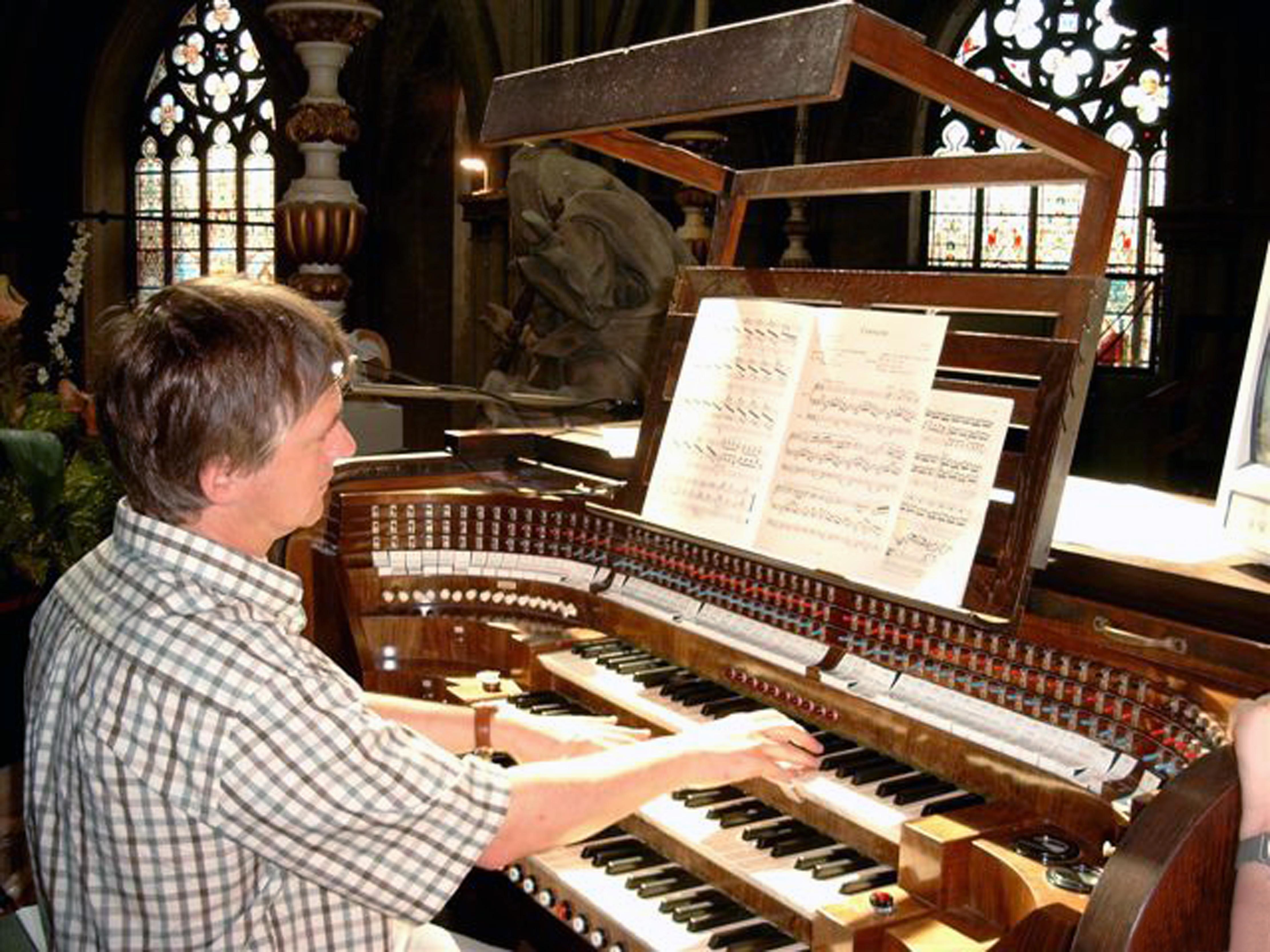
- Michiels playing the organ in St. Salvator's Cathedral, Bruges (where he is the organist) in 2008.
- Born: 7 December 1963 (age 62); Bruges, West Flanders, Belgium
- Education: Lemmensinstituut; Southern Methodist University; Royal Conservatory of Brussels; Conservatoire de Paris
- Occupations: Concert organist; Choral conductor; Academic teacher
- Organizations: Cantores; Reger-Chor; Royal Conservatory of Ghent; Music academy of Bruges
- Website: www.ignacemichiels.com

Ignace Michiels (born 7 December 1963) is a Belgian organist, choral conductor and organ teacher. He is internationally known as a concert organist.

== Career ==
Michiels studied the organ, the piano and the harpsichord at the music academy of Bruges. In 1986 he won a prize at the Lemmensinstituut in Leuven. He continued his studies with Robert Anderson at the Southern Methodist University in Dallas, with Herman Verschraegen at the Royal Conservatory of Brussels, and with Odile Pierre at the Conservatoire de Paris where he graduated with a Prix d'Excellence. He also received the Higher Diploma of organ music at the Royal Conservatory of Ghent.

Ignace Michiels has been teaching organ at the Royal Conservatory in Ghent and the music academy of Bruges. He has been principal organist of the St. Salvator's Cathedral. Michiels is responsible for the cathedral music in services and the Kathedraalconcerten, a series of concerts with a tradition dating back to 1952.

He conducted the oratorio choir Cantores from 1990 to 2005. Michiels prepared the choir for concerts and recordings, such as Beethoven's Ninth Symphony with the BRTN Philharmonic Orchestra Brussels, conducted by Alexander Rahbari.

Michiels has served on the jury of international organ competitions and has taught masterclasses. He has collaborated with Flemish classical radio stations.

== International concerts ==
In 1999 he collaborated with Gabriel Dessauer, organist of St. Bonifatius, Wiesbaden, in a project to jointly bring to a close a century of violence. Both in Bruges and in Wiesbaden a concert was performed by the choirs Cantores and Chor von St. Bonifatius, Michiels playing the organ and Dessauer conducting. The concert in Bruges on 23 October 1999 was named Eeuw van zinloos Geweld (Century of meaningless violence) and expressed it in Maurice Duruflé's Prélude et Fugue sur le nom d'Alain, Jules Van Nuffel's In convertendo Dominus, Jehan Alain's Litanies, Rudolf Mauersberger's Wie liegt die Stadt so wüst, Gerald Hendrie's Exsultate from the sonata In praise of reconciliation, and Duruflé's Requiem. The concert in Wiesbaden was called Versöhnungskonzert zum Ende des Jahrhunderts (Concert of reconciliation at the end of the century).

The collaboration has continued since 2001 in annual choral projects with organ, played by Michiels. German and Flemish singers have formed the Reger-Chor-International singing concerts in Germany and in Belgium. In their first concert in Bruges on 30 June 2001 they performed Théodore Dubois' Fiat Lux, William Lloyd Webber's Missa Sanctae Mariae Magdalenae, Allegro giocoso of Edward Bairstow, Duruflè's Toccata, Van Nuffel's Psalm 92 Dominus regnavit, and Max Reger's Hebbel-Requiem in the organ version of Max Beckschäfer. The slightly different concert in Wiesbaden was recorded.

On 19 August 2002, Michiels played an organ concert at the Rheingau Musik Festival in the church of St. Markus of Erbach.

On 2 December 2006 he conducted Bach's Christmas Oratorio with the Reger-Chor-International in a concert held in the Concertgebouw of Bruges.

On 1 August 2008, he played Messiaen's Messe de la Pentecôte on the Flentrop organ in the Grote kerk) in Breda. He played works of Brahms with the Reger-Chor-International and organ works of Otto Olsson, Julius Reubke, Joseph Jongen and Camil Van Hulse. On 27 October he played works of Schumann, Olsson, Flor Peeters, Gaston Litaize, and Naji Hakim at the International Organist Festival in Turin.

On 4 July 2010, he played with the harpist Andrea Voets in concert at the Festival de la Ribagorza in the Basílica de la Peña de Graus in Graus.

As part of the Boni-Musikwochen 2010 in St. Bonifatius, Wiesbaden, celebrating 25 Jahre Reger-Chor, he performed a recital, including Reger's Toccata from op. 59 and Scherzo from op. 65, and Mendelssohn's Variations sérieuses. In a concert with the choir he performed the last movement of Bach's cantata BWV 134a, Van Nuffel's In convertendo Dominus and Reger's Requiem. He played Jongen's Prelude et fugue op. 121, Charles Tournemire's Victimae paschali, and Marcel Dupré's Prelude et fugue op. 7/3.

On 3 October 2012, he was the organist in the premiere of Colin Mawby's Missa solemnis Bonifatius-Messe, composed to celebrate the 150th anniversary of the choir Chor von St. Bonifatius in Wiesbaden, conducted by Dessauer.

== Recordings ==
Several of the Kathedraalconcerten have been recorded, works for organ, including three of eight sonatas of Alexandre Guilmant, and works for organ with pan flute and trumpet. He appears with Organ Sonata op. 175 of Louis Maes on a Jubileum CD celebrating 150 years Bruges conservatory (1997).

Michiels participated in recordings of choral music, including:

- Joseph Ryelandt: Sacred choral works, with Greta De Reyghere, Collegium Instrumentale Brugense, Capella Brugensis, conductor Patrick Peire (1997)
- Francis Poulenc, Gabriel Fauré, with Hilde Coppé, Collegium Instrumentale Brugense, Jan van der Crabben, Capella Brugensis, conductor Patrick Peire (2000)
- Max Reger: Hebbel-Requiem and organ works, with Reger-Chor-International, conductor Gabriel Dessauer (2001, recorded live in St. Bonifatius, Wiesbaden)
- Max Reger: Der 100. Psalm, Introduction, Passacaglia and Fugue, Op. 127, with Reger-Chor-International, conductor Gabriel Dessauer (2003, recorded live in St. Bonifatius, Wiesbaden)
- Johan Duijck: El Camino de Alma - de Weg van de Ziel, with Hilde Coppé, Collegium Instrumentale Brugense, Noëlle Schepens, Vlaams Radio Koor (VRK), Hans Ryckelynck, Gents Madrigaalkoor, conductor Johan Duijck (2008)
- Johan Duijck: Cantiones Sacrae, with Vlaams Radio Koor, conductor Johan Duijck (2009)
