= Church of St. Stefanus, Ghent =

Church of St. Stefanus
- Sint-Stefanuskerk (Dutch)
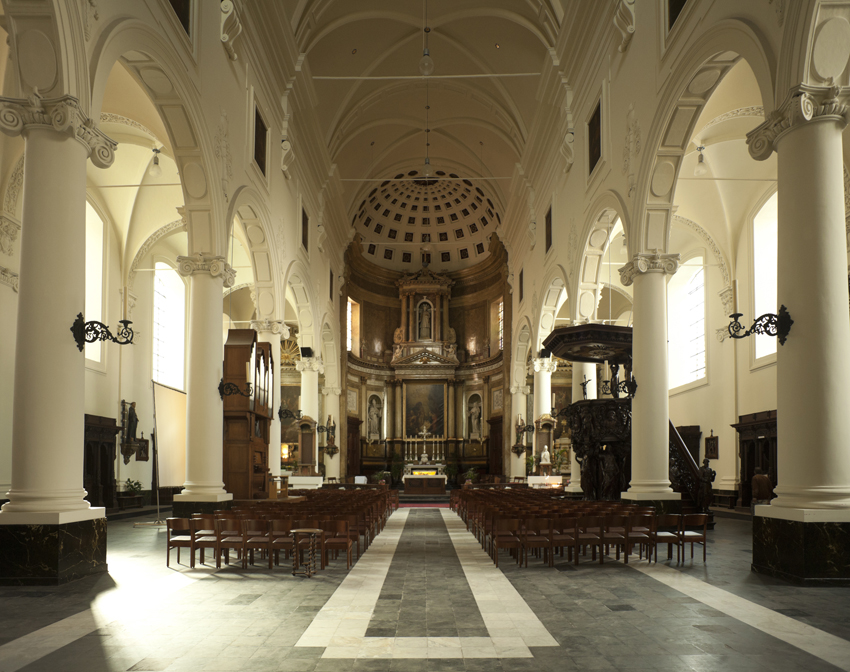
- Interior facing the altar
- Church of St. Stefanus
- 51.060042°N 3.720611°E
- Location: Sint-Margrietstraat, Ghent
- Country: Belgium
- Denomination: Catholic

History
- Consecrated: 1841

Architecture
- Architect: Jean Baptiste De Baets

The Church of St. Stefanus (Dutch: Sint-Stefanuskerk) is a Catholic parish church in Ghent, Belgium, part of an Augustinian monastery. It is dedicated to Saint Stephen. The present building dates from 1841.

The former monastery of 1606 was almost completely destroyed by a fire in 1838. The Augustinians temporarily used the church of the Carmelites. The church was rebuilt on a design by Jean Baptiste De Baets, using items brought over from the Carmelite church, including a 17th-century Baroque pulpit, the choir for the monks, and eight confession stalls. The church was also equipped with statues of saints, including one of St. Stephen created by Brother Prosper Venneman, who also designed the high altar. The church was consecrated on 26 December 1841, the patron saint's feast day. The tower was completed in 1849.

Several altars are works by Gaspar de Crayer. The main organ was built by Philippe Forrest in 1873. A second instrument is a Flentrop-organ, built in 1962, originally for a Baptist church in Enschede. When that church was put to other use, the organ was sold to the Palace of Fine Arts in Brussels, where it was played by Pierre Cochereau. It was then moved to Ghent.

The church and the monastery were listed as historic monuments in 1958; the church was listed as an item of architectural heritage in 2009.

The church is a concert venue for mostly sacred music focused on the organs. The program included in 2017 an international organ festival on the theme Humor, with Winfried Bönig, the cathedral organist of Cologne, playing works by Bach, Franz Lehrndorfer and Naji Hakim, among others. A concert programmed for the "Maarten Luther-jaar", features Max Reger's Der 100. Psalm in the organ version by François Callebout, performed by the international Reger-Chor, conducted by Gabriel Dessauer, with Ignace Michiels, cathedral organist of Bruges.
