= Jacobus van Eynde =

Flemish organ builder

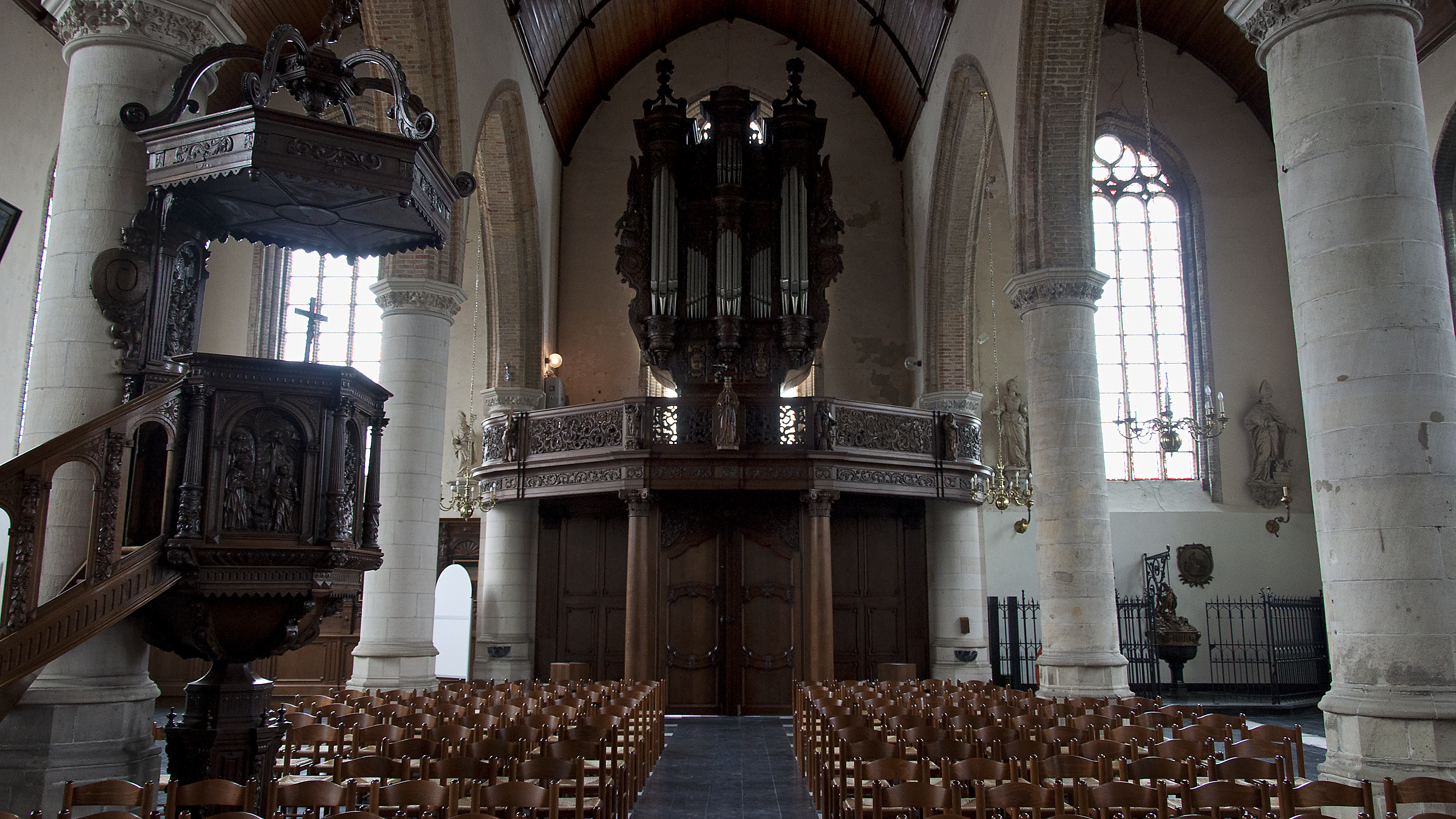
The organ of the Sint-Pieterskerk in Lo, Belgium

Jacobus van Eynde or van den Eynde (fl. 1696–1729; died 17 January 1729) was a Flemish organ builder.

== Biography ==
Both place and date of van Eynde's birth are currently unknown. He was likely the son of Pierre van Eynde, organist of the Church of Saint-Éloi in Dunkirk (French Flanders, then part of the Habsburg Netherlands). Pierre was an organist in Saint-Éloi from 1684 to 1718. It is not known where Jacobus learned his art, but he probably studied with Jan and Guilielmus van Belle.

He was renowned for the quality of his instruments and was referred to as the pinnacle of the West Flemish Baroque. He can be regarded as the most important organ builder in the county of Flanders until the beginning of the 18th century. His work was the pinnacle of the Langhedul school, via Nicolaas Helewoudt and Jan and Guilielmus van Belle.

From 1696 van Eynde lived in Ypres. His organ building can be divided into three periods: Franco-Flemish (until 1707), Bruges (1707–1719), and Ypres (1719–1729). In 1718 he completed the organ for the Cathedral of Bruges.

Van Eynde's style is part of the line of continuity that can be discerned in the 17th-century South Flemish organ building, heralded by Matthys Langhedul and further spread by the Ypres Jan and Guilielmus Van Belle and the Bruges residents Nicolaas Helewout and Boudewijn Ledou. There are several characteristics from the school of Nicolaas van Hagen - passed on to Van Belle 's work through his companion François van Isacker.

== List of organs ==
- 1696: Sint-Aldegondiskerk, Saint-Omer, now in Nielles-lès-Ardres
- 1701: Sint-Jan-Baptistkerk, Saint-Omer
- 1703: Saint-Omer Cathedral, Saint-Omer
- Church of Saint-Éloi, Dunkirk
- 1707: Sint-Annakerk, Bruges
- 1710: Sint-Maartenskerk
- 1711: St. Trudo's Abbey, Bruges
- 1714: Abbey Church of Lo
- 1715: Onze-Lieve-Vrouwkerk, Poperinge, destroyed during the First World War
- 1716: Klooster Engelendale, transferred to the parish church of Stalhille and kept there almost intact
- 1717: Onze-Lieve-Vrouw-Onbevlekt-Ontvangenkerk, Ver-Assebroek
- 1717: Sint-Pietersbandenkerk, Oostkamp
- 1717–1719: St. Salvator's Cathedral Bruges (perhaps his biggest instrument)
- Lichtervelde
- Sint-Pieterskerk, Esen
- 1718: Sint-Wandregesiluskerk, Bollezeele
- 1728: Sint-Pieterskerk, Ypres, destroyed during the First World War
