= Petra Morath-Pusinelli =

German organist

Petra Morath-Pusinelli (* 1967) is a German organist.

She studied Catholic Church Music at the Frankfurt University of Music and Performing Arts. Since 1984 she has been an organist at the church St. Kilian, Wiesbaden, and accompanied various choirs, including the Reger-Chor from the late 1980s and the Bachchor Mainz, conducted by Ralf Otto. She has been a lecturer at the University of Mainz since May 2006.

In 1990, Petra Morath was the organist in John Rutter's Requiem in the version for chamber ensemble, with the Reger-Chor, Monika Fuhrmann (soprano) and instrumentalists, conducted by Gabriel Dessauer, recorded live in St. Bonifatius, Wiesbaden. In 2008 she played the organ part in Otto's album Noël: French Romantic Music for Christmas (2008). In November 2009 she played Duruflé's Requiem with a choir of volunteers in a memorial concert against Antisemitism, initiated and conducted by Gabriel Dessauer.
