= St. Andreas, Munich =

Coordinates: 48.126175°N 11.553856°E

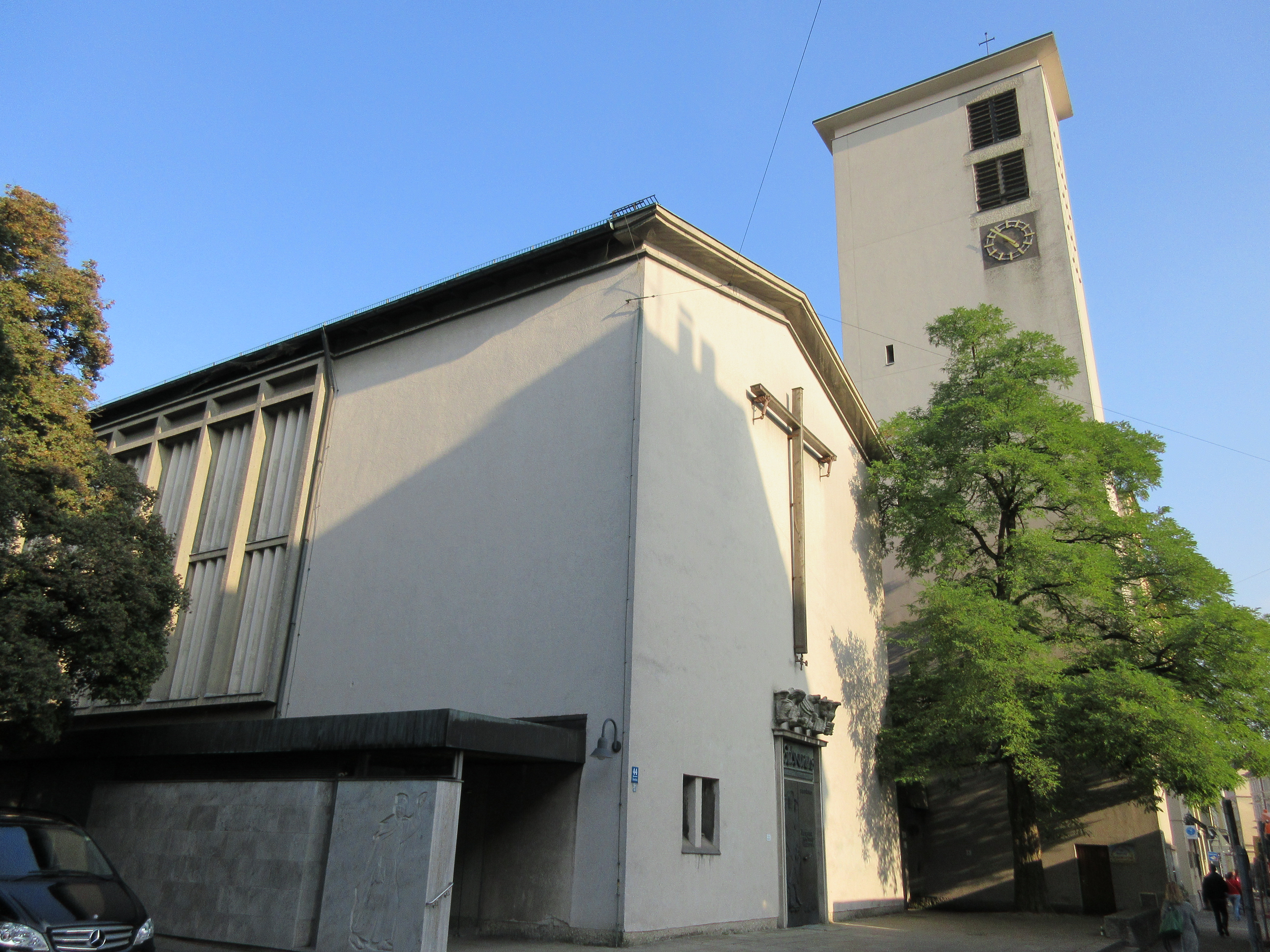
St. Andreas in Munich

St. Andreas is a church and former parish in Munich, Bavaria, Germany. It was built from 1952 to 1953 as one of the first modern church buildings in Munich after World War II, designed by Ernst Maria Lang.

== History ==
The present church is located in the Zenettistraße 44 in Munich's Schlachthofviertel, a new quarter at the end of the 19th century. Church services were held in a former ball room from the 1920s. It was consecrated on 25 November 1923, and transformed into a church, dedicated to Saint Andrew. It was extended by a kindergarten and a home for nuns. The whole complex was destroyed in 1944 by the bombing of Munich. While kindergarten and nuns' home were restored, the ruin of the church remained a provisional Notkirche.

In 1950 the Diocese of Munich acquired four ruined properties in the Zenettistraße for a new church and ran an architecture competition. It was won by Ernst Maria Lang, and architect from Munich. Building began in November 1952, the corner stone was set on 12 April 1953, and the church was consecrated on 29 November 1953, as one of the first new churches in the city.

The building is a listed monument of the Bavarian State Office for Monument Protection.
