= Max Beckschäfer =

German organist, composer and academic

- Born: 23 February 1952; Münster
- Education: Richard Strauss Conservatory; Musikhochschule München
- Occupations: Church musician; Composer; Academic teacher
- Organization: Hochschule für Musik und Theater München
- Awards: Villa Massimo

Max Beckschäfer (born 23 February 1952 in Münster) is a German organist, composer and academic who taught at the Hochschule für Musik und Theater München and the Hochschule für Musik Augsburg-Nürnberg. He received commissions from the Munich Biennale, the concert series Klangspuren, the Dresdner Kreuzchor, the Palucca-Ballettschule Dresden and Die Singphoniker. He wrote an organ version of Reger's Hebbel-Requiem.

== Life and career ==
Beckschäfer took classes at the Richard Strauss Conservatory in Munich in organ, piano, violin and choral conducting. He studied church music at the Musikhochschule München and continued studying composition with Wilhelm Killmayer. He was a Kantor in Munich from 1976 to 1987.

On the initiative of Gabriel Dessauer, who wanted to make a performance of Reger's Requiem possible, Beckschäfer wrote an organ version of the short work, which the composer had scored for a huge orchestra and a choir to match. The organ version was premiered in 1985 in the Marktkirche Wiesbaden by the Reger-Chor, formed for the occasion, and Beckschäfer as the organist, conducted by Dessauer.

In 1987 Beckschäfer received the Rompreis for composition and a fellowship of the Villa Massimo in Rom. From 1988 to 2001 he was a teacher for music theory at the Hochschule für Musik und Theater München. He moved to the Hochschule für Musik Augsburg-Nürnberg in 2001, teaching in Nürnberg from 2007. In 2009 he received a scholarship of the "Centro Tedesco di Studi Veneziani" in Venice.

Beckschäfer was awarded the Förderpreis für Musik der Stadt München, among others. Works have been commissioned by the Munich Biennale, the concert series Klangspuren of the Bavarian State Orchestra, Musica Viva Ingolstadt, the Bayerische Akademie der Schönen Künste, the Dresdner Kreuzchor and the Palucca-Ballettschule Dresden. He has concentrated on vocal music and choral music. For the vocal sextet Die Singphoniker he wrote new works and arrangements. He participated in the educational violin collection Augsburger Violinbuch. His piano composition Lichte Gedanken was premiered in 2010 by Andreas Skourasat at the Gasteig.

His vocal and chamber music was recorded on CDs, including a Portrait-CD.

== Recordings ==
- Beckschäfer, Maximilian; Rolla, Birgit; Nettinger, Hubert; Jäger, Dorothee; Weinzierl, Elisabeth; Müller, Barbara; Singphoniker; Duo Cantarpa; Capella Vocale (2003), Michelangelo-Fragmente (in undetermined language), Bamberg: Cavalli-Records, OCLC 166009766
