= Concertgebouw, Bruges =

Cultural centre in Bruges, Belgium

Coordinates: 51°12′13″N 3°13′06″E

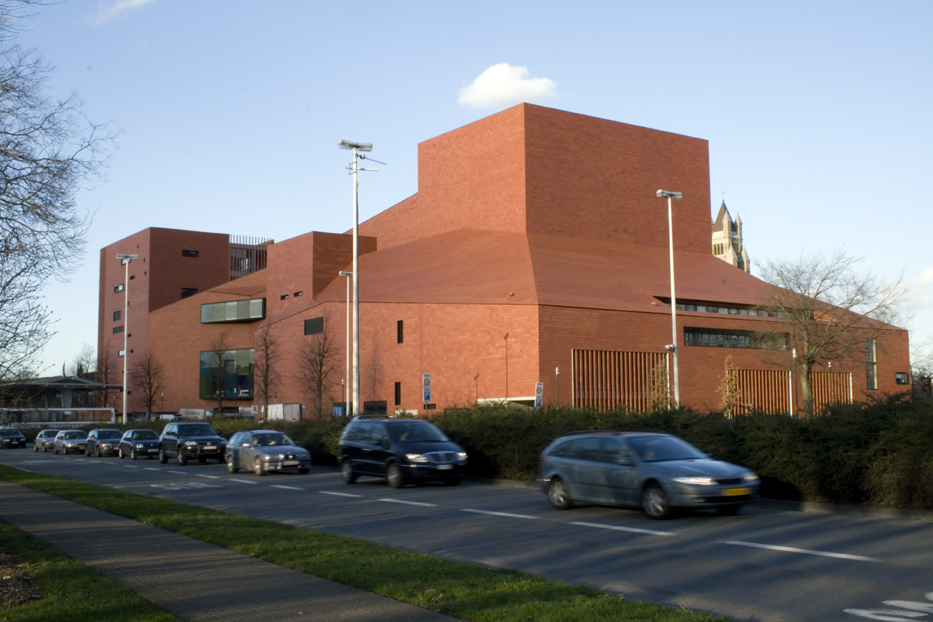
Concertgebouw in Bruges

The Concertgebouw (Concert building) is a cultural centre in Bruges, Belgium. Located at 't Zand, it was completed in 2002 when Bruges was European Capital of Culture, designed by Paul Robbrecht and Hilde Daem.

The building complex houses a large concert hall seating more than 1290 visitors on three levels and a chamber music hall seating 320. It features a café and room for exhibitions in the Lantaarntoren (Lantern Tower) which offers a view of the historic town.

The building rests on 4,669 poles. The interior is rather sober, and the halls offer excellent acoustics, thanks to advanced technology. The facades are covered with thousands of red terracotta tiles from Saint-Omer in northern France, while the Lantaarntoren is built mainly from glass.

Located close to the historic centre, the building has raised divided reactions: some like its contrasting looks, others think it does not match the architecture of the old town.

== Gallery ==
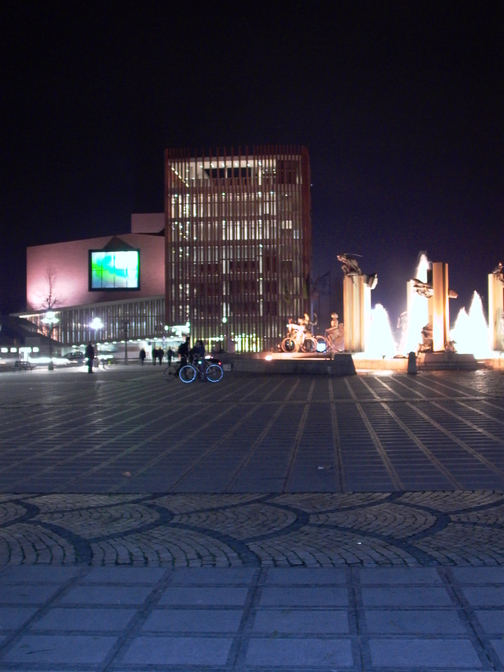
't Zand and the Concertgebouw with the Lantaarn Tower

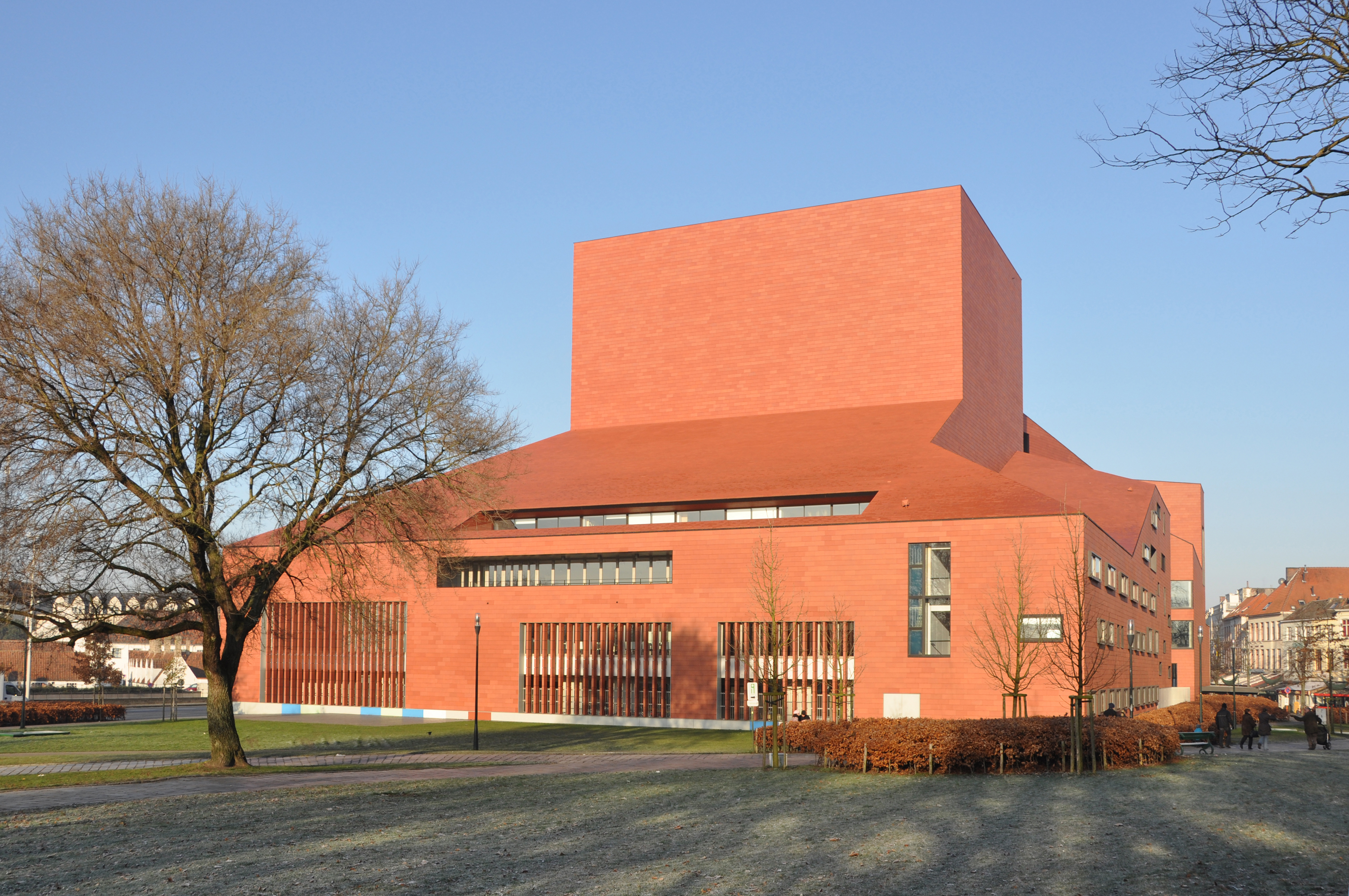
Back

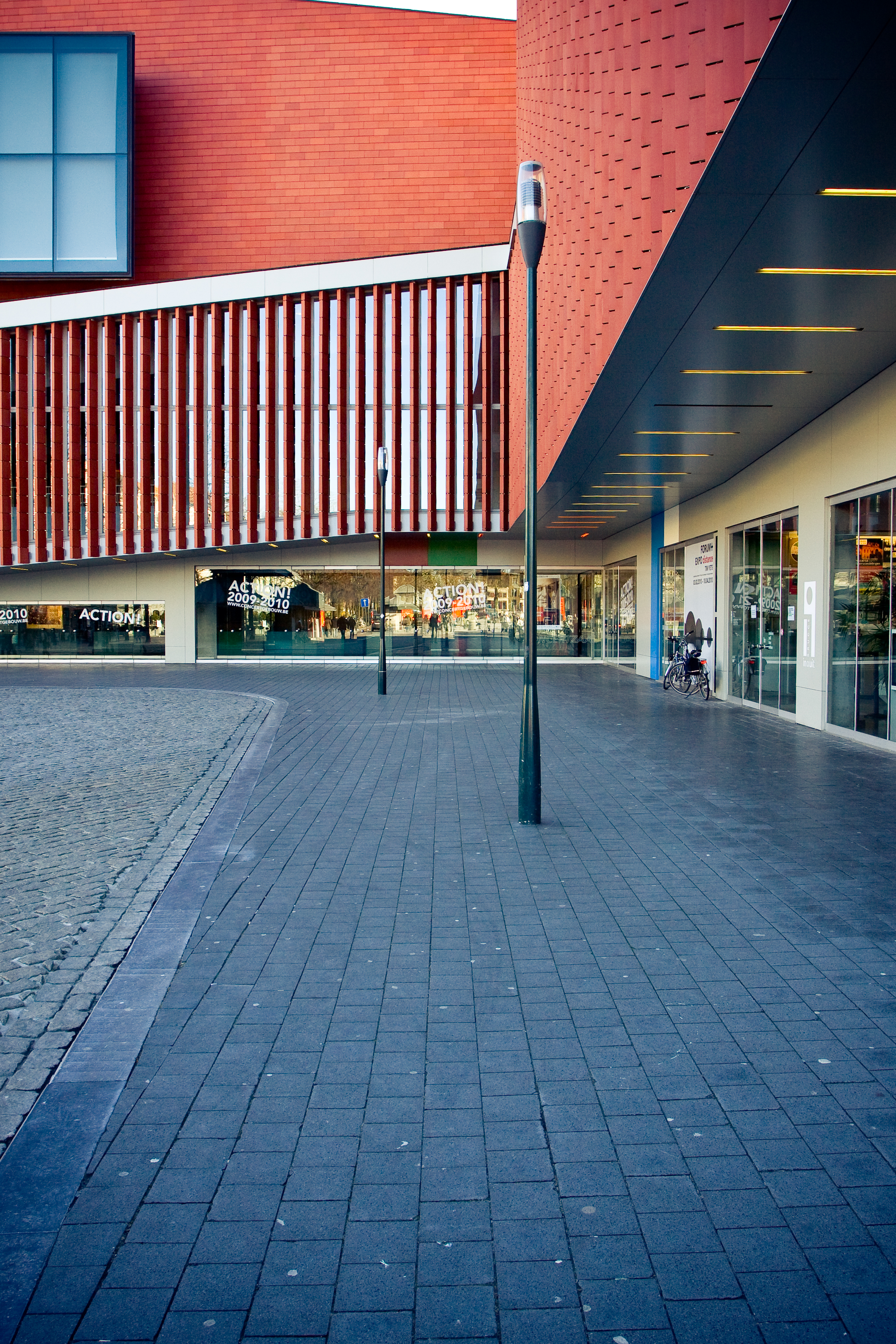
Main entrance

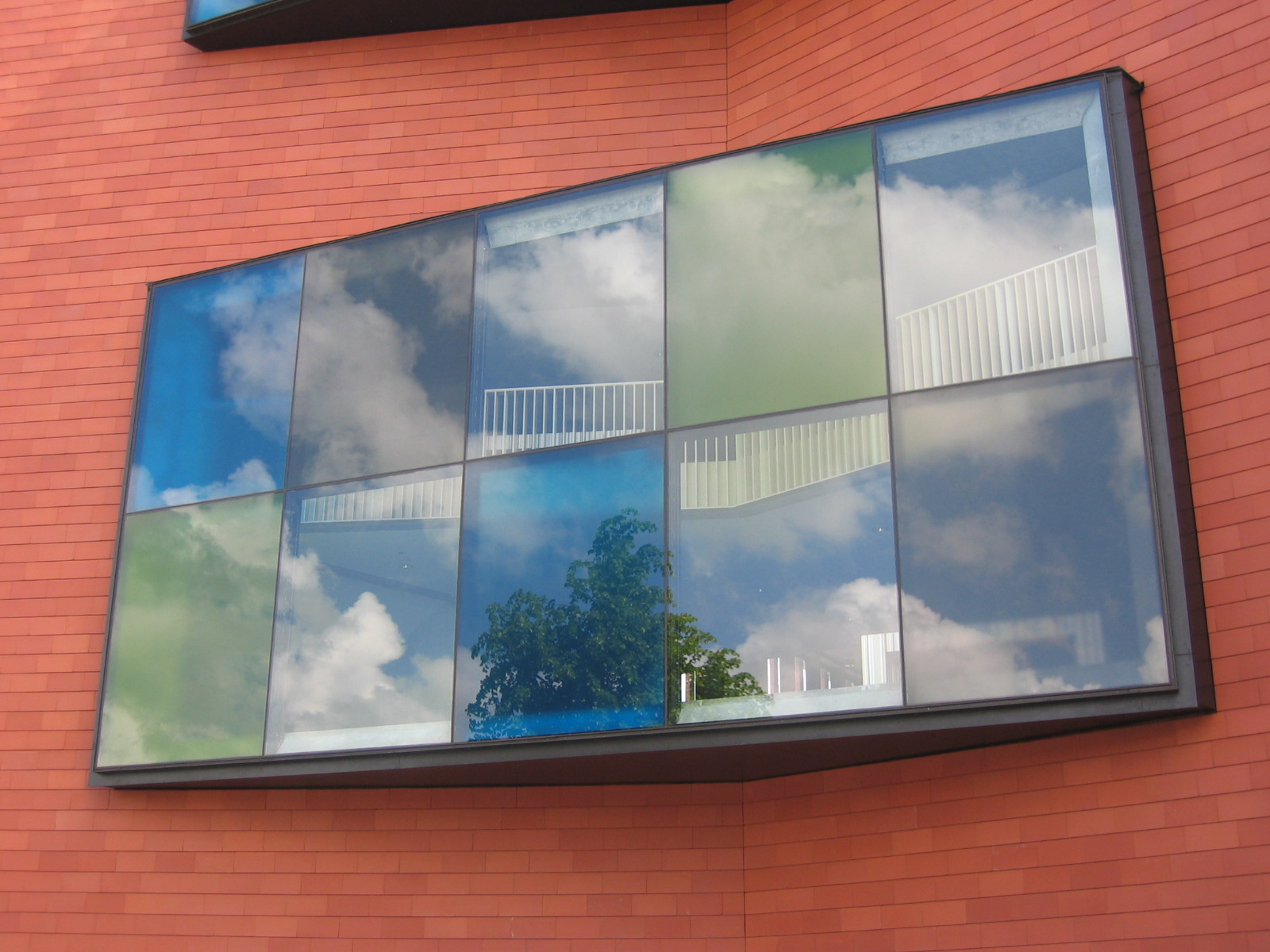
Detail of the west front
