= Gerald Hendrie =

English scholar, composer, and keyboardist (b. 1935)

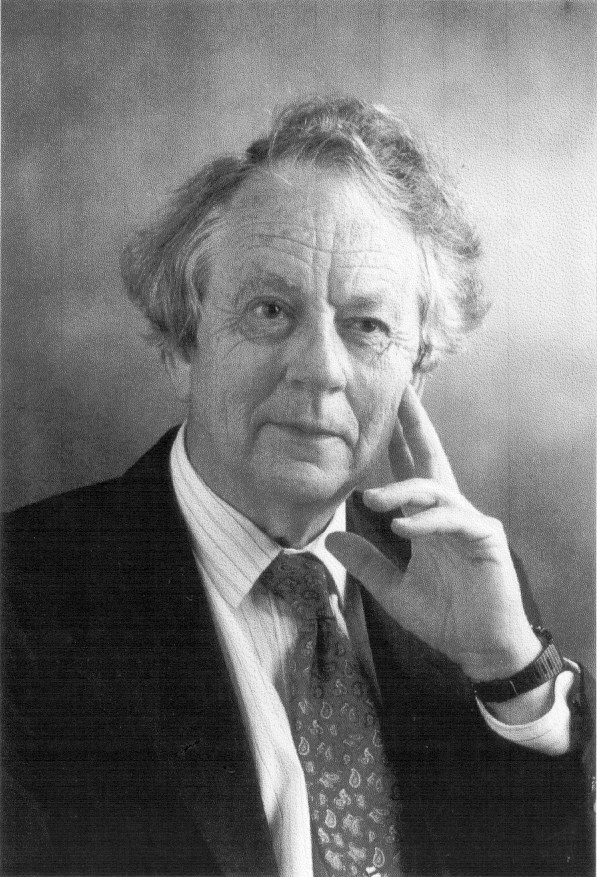

Background information
- Born: Gerald Mills Hendrie; 28 October 1935 (age 90); Westcliff-on-Sea, Essex, England, UK
- Genre: Classical
- Occupations: Academic, musicologist, composer
- Instruments: Organ, piano, harpsichord

Gerald Mills Hendrie (born 28 October 1935; at Westcliff-on-Sea, Essex) is an English scholar, composer, organist, pianist and harpsichordist.

== Education ==
- Framlingham College, Suffolk, 1949–52, Foundation Scholar
- Royal College of Music (RCM), 1952–54, Foundation Scholar, Piano (ARCM in Organ Performing 1953, Piano Teaching 1953, Piano Performing 1954); Gained Sir Walter Parratt prize.
- Selwyn College, Cambridge 1954–61, Organ Scholar. (BA 1957, MusB with distinction 1958, MA 1961, Ph.D. 1962);
- Royal College of Organists (RCO), FRCO (1956)
- Studied at the RCM with Geoffrey Tankard, Harold Darke, William Harris, Herbert Howells; at Cambridge with Thurston Dart and Patrick Hadley; privately with Geraint Jones, John Dykes Bower, Ralph Downes, and André Marchal

== Locums ==
- Christmas 1955, Acting Assistant Organist, Canterbury Cathedral including first-ever Eurovision

Broadcast, ‘Carols from Canterbury’.

- 1960-61 Acting Organist and Choirmaster, Norwich Cathedral
- During 1962, Acting Assistant Organist, Ely Cathedral

== Academic posts ==
- Director of Music, Homerton College, Cambridge 1962–3
- Lecturer in Music, University of Manchester 1963–7
- Founding Professor of Music, University of Victoria, British Columbia 1967-69
- Founding Professor of Music, Open University 1969-85 (early retirement)
- Director of Studies in Music, St John's College, Cambridge 1980–83
- Visiting Fellow, University of Western Australia 1985 (following earlier visits)

== Publications (articles & editions) ==
- An Edition and Critical Study of the Keyboard Music of Orlando Gibbons (1583-1625), 2 vols., doctoral dissertation University of Cambridge October 1961
- The Keyboard Music of Orlando Gibbons in Proceedings of the Royal Musical Association vol. 89, 1962/63
- Handel's 'Chandos' and Associated Anthems: An Introductory Survey in ed. Peter Williams, Bach, Handel, Scarlatti 1685-1985, Tercentenary Essays, Cambridge University Press 1985
- Half-way Towards the 21 st Century: Music at Britain's Open University 1970-85 in International

Journal of Music Education May 1985

- Some Reflections on the Keyboard Music of Jean-Philippe Rameau (1683-1764) in Studies in Music, Number 22, 1988, University of Western Australia Department of Music
- The English Lute-Songs 1st Series, vol. 17, co-editor with Thurston Dart of John Coprario: Funeral Teares, Songs of Mourning, The Masque of Squires Stainer & Bell 1959
- Musica Britannica XX, Orlando Gibbons: Keyboard Music (= Collected Keyboard Music) Stainer & Bell for the Royal Musical Association 1962, 2nd revised edition 1974, 3rd revised edition 2010
- Hallische Händel-Ausgabe/Halle Handel Society, Collected Works of Georg Friedrich Händel, Anthems für Cannons 3 vols. Bärenreiter 1985, 1987, 1991; Anthems für die Chapel Royal Bärenreiter 1994, Utrecht Te Deum & Jubilate Bärenreiter 1998
- Gilbert & Sullivan: The Operas (critical editions in full score) Iolanthe 3 vols., The Broude Trust NY 2018; Iolanthe vocal score, The Broude Trust 2019

== Publications (compositions) ==
=== Piano ===
- Five Bagatelles for Piano Stainer & Bell 1980
- Four Excursions for Piano Stainer & Bell 1983
- Sonata: In Praise of Reconciliation (an arrangement of Organ Sonata, commemorates 50th anniversary of end of WW2) Anglo-American, henceforth AAMP 1997
- A Handful of Rags Gérard Billaudot Editeur, Paris 2015
- Another Handful of Rags Gérard Billaudot Editeur, Paris 2015
- Twelve New Rags Lyrebird Music 2025

=== Organ ===
- Speculo Petro AAMP 1968
- Choral: Hommage à César Franck AAMP 1990
- Le Tombeau de Marcel Dupré (= Toccata & Fugue*, Prelude & Fugue, Prelude & Fugue on the name BACH, Two Sketches on the name BACH, published individually) AAMP 1990–92
- recorded by John Scott, Church of St. Ignatius Loyola NY, 20th-Century Masterpieces Priory records 1998, Gabriel Dessauer at St Bonifatius, Wiesbaden (GEMA 1999) and Paul Carr at St Chad's Cathedral, Birmingham UK, French Flavours, Regent Records 2012); also on YouTube from Washington Cathedral, USA.
- Sonata: In Praise of St Asaph (commissioned by St Asaph Festival, UK) AAMP 1994
- Sonata: In Praise of Reconciliation (a US commission; see also above, Piano) AAMP 1997
- Six Concert Studies Banks Music Publications 2025
- Four Concert Rags Lyrebird Music 2025
- Le Tombeau de Marcel Dupré (see above) revised edition in single volume Lyrebird Music 2025

=== Flute & Piano ===
- Three Pieces AAMP 1985

=== Brass ===
- Quintet for Brass (for the Philip Jones Brass Ensemble) AAMP 1988

=== Church Music ===
- As I outrode this endris night (i) carol for SS, organ or piano Novello 1959; recorded by the cathedral choirs of Canterbury, York Minster, Carlisle; also by Selwyn College, Cambridge & others (ii) for SATB Novello 1978; this version for the Service of Nine Lessons & * Carols, King's College Cambridge.
- Sweet was the Song the Virgin Sang, carol for SS, Organ/Piano Novello 1960
- There is no Rose, carol for SATB, Novello 1984, recorded by Lichfield Cathedral Choir, Nimbus Records 1996
- Four Consolations (texts by Boethius) for SATB unacc. Paraclete 1996
- Ave verum Corpus for ATB/SATB unacc. Williams School of Church Music 1978, subsequently AAMP
- If thou wouldst see God's laws, SATB, organ or piano AAMP 1988
- Preces and Responses, SATB, for St John's College, Cambridge AAMP 1980s
- Magnificat & Nunc Dimittis, SATB, organ, for St John's College, Cambridge AAMP 1986
- Magnificat & Nunc Dimittis, SATB, organ, for New College, Oxford AAMP 1986
- Te Deum & Jubilate, men's voices and organ, for St Paul's Cathedral, London AAMP 1998
- Magnificat & Nunc Dimittis boy's voices and organ, for St Paul's Cathedral, London AAMP 1988
- Magnificat & Nunc Dimittis, SATB, organ, for Canterbury Cathedral AAMP 1993
- Magnificat & Nunc Dimittis, ATB, organ, for Canterbury Cathedral AAMP 1994
- Requiem for soprano solo, SATB and organ, optional timpani (3), cello (premiered in Auch Festival, France) AAMP 1997

=== Unpublished/unsubmitted ===
- Missa Aquitaniae for soprano solo, SATB, organ (premiered in Auch Festival, 2003
- Sounat Campanetos carol for SATB, Gascon & English texts, 2005
- Twelve New Rags for Piano (four of which are arranged for organ) (2015–19)
- Pastorale & Fughetta & Chaconne for organ (2018–20)
- Concert Studies Nos. 1-3 for organ for Andrea Albertin (2021)
- Concert Studies Nos. 4-6 for organ for Tom Winpenny (2022–2023)
- Sicilienne: Hommage à Maurice Duruflé for Tom Winpenny (2022)

== Performance ==
- He has performed as organist, pianist and harpsichordist around the world and broadcast for ABC, BBC, CBC.
- Guest recitalist at the Halle Handel Festival 1981.

== Recordings ==
- Gerald Hendrie Complete Organ Music Volume 1 (comprising Le Tombeau de Marcel Dupré Sicilienne, Choral: Hommage à César Franck, Specula Petro, Sonata: In Praise of St Asaph), Tom Winpenny, organ of St Albans Cathedral, Toccata Classics 2023. A review from the British Music Society for this recording can be found here.
- Gerald Hendrie Complete Organ Music Volume 2 (comprising Six Concert Studies, Pastorale and Fughetta, Sonate en Trio, Sonata: In Praise of Reconciliation), Tom Winpenny, organ of St Albans Cathedral, Toccata Classics 2024.
