= Introduction, Passacaglia and Fugue =

1913 composition by Max Reger

- Organ music by Max Reger
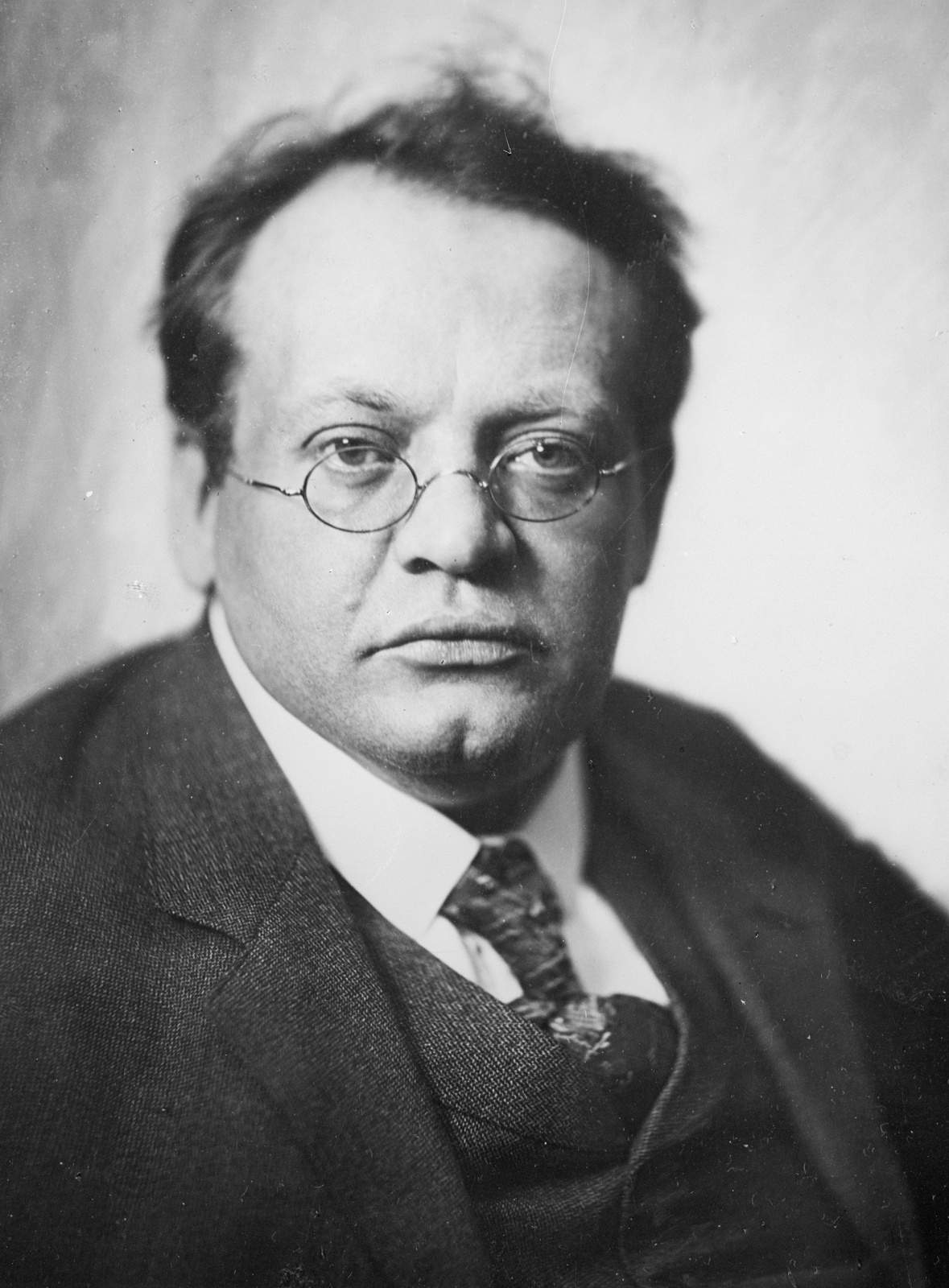
- Reger in 1913
- Key: E minor
- Opus: 127
- Composed: 1913
- Dedication: Karl Straube
- Published: 1913

Introduction, Passacaglia and Fugue (German: Introduction, Passacaglia und Fuge) in E minor, Op. 127, is an extended composition for organ by Max Reger, composed in 1913 and dedicated to Karl Straube who played the premiere in Breslau on 24 September. It was published in November that year in Berlin by Bote & Bock.

== History ==
Reger composed the work in Meiningen, Thuringia, Germany in April and May 1913. He wrote the organ piece with the intent for it to be performed for organ concerts, rather than for church services, called "in grand style" ("ganz großen Stils"). Reger composed the work on a commission for the opening celebrations of a new concert hall in Breslau, the Centennial Hall (Jahrhunderthalle).

Reger revived organ concert music which had become unfashionable. In Karl Straube, he had an organist and friend who was able to play technically difficult music, and to influence the composition. The markings for expression are believed to have been influenced by Straube. Reger dedicated the work to Straube who played the first performance in Breslau on 24 September 1913. The composition was published in November 2013 in Berlin by Ed. Bote & G. Bock.

== Music ==
The work is structured in three sections, the introduction, a passacaglia with 26 variations, and a double fugue. The variations build in intensity towards the fugue.

The organist David Goode wrote that the introduction begins with dense chromaticism and flourishing figuration. The passacaglia is based on a theme which uses eleven of the twelve notes of the chromatic scale. 26 variations are grouped in the sections: a first, intensifying speed and texture, a second as a meditative centre, and a third, again intensifying towards the fugue. He notes Reger's "effective control of pace and excitement".

== Manuscript and edition ==
The Max-Reger-Institute holds Reger's manuscript of the work which was intended for the engraver.

- Reger, Max. Sämtliche Orgelwerke. Vol. 6. Choralfantasien. Wiesbaden/Leipzig/Paris: Breitkopf & Härtel. pp. 91–147.

== Legacy ==
The Canadian composer Healey Willan heard the work, played by his friend Dalton Baker. When Baker said "that such a work could only have been composed by a 'German philosophical mind'" Willan was challenged to write a composition of the same structure, completed in 1916.

== Bibliography ==
- Clements, Andrew (2013). "Reger: Introduction, Variations and Fugue; etc – review". The Guardian.
- Dawes, Chris (2005). "Theatricality in Healey Willan's Introduction, Passacaglia and Fugue for organ (1916)" (PDF). humanities.mcmaster.ca. Archived from the original (PDF) on 11 December 2018.
- Goode, David (2013). "Introduction, Passacaglia and Fugue in E minor, Op. 127". Hyperion Records.
- Hörnicke, Richard (2015). "Orgel-Winterspiele in St.Bonifatius mit Regers "Phantasie und Fuge über B–A–C–H" eröffnet". Wiesbadener Kurier (in German). Archived from the original on 11 December 2018.
- Thissen, Paul (2016). "Anmerkungen zu Max Regers Orgelmusik (Teil 1)" (PDF) (in German). Diocese of Paderborn. Archived from the original (PDF) on 30 July 2016.
- "Introduction, Passacaglia und Fuge e-Moll Op. 127 / für Orgel". Max-Reger-Institute. 2016.
- "Volume I/2-3 Fantasias and fugues, variations, sonatas, suites". Max-Reger-Institute. 2016. Archived from the original on 5 December 2018.
- "Music manuscripts". Max-Reger-Institute. 2016.
- "1913". Max-Reger-Institute. 2016. Archived from the original on 2 April 2023.
