= St. Salvator's Cathedral =

Roman Catholic cathedral in Bruges, Belgium

Coordinates: 51.2055°N 3.2215°E

St. Salvator's Cathedral Sint-Salvatorskathedraal
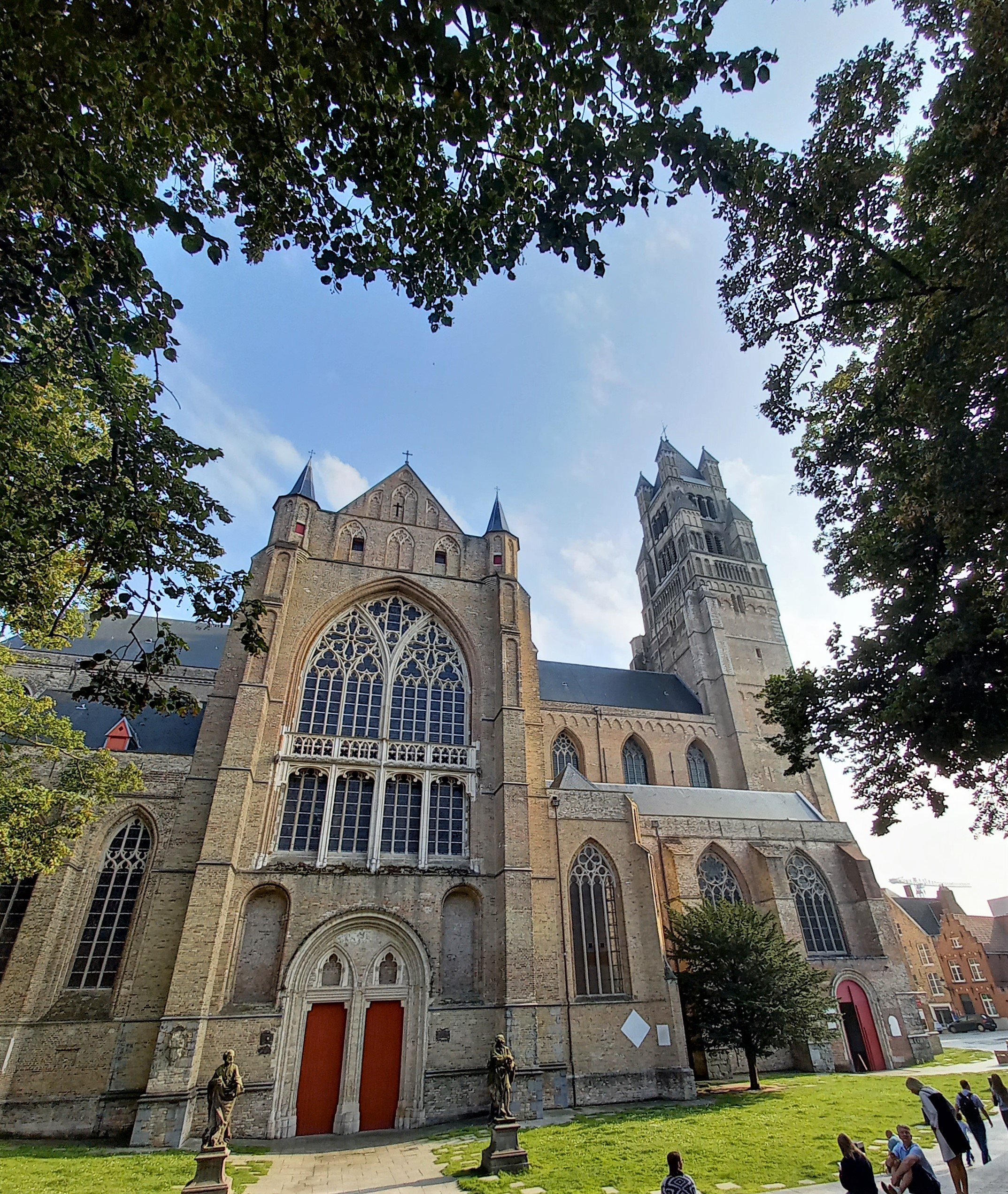
- The facade of the cathedral

Religion
- Affiliation: Roman Catholic Church
- Ecclesiastical or organizational status: Cathedral
- Status: Active

Location
- Location: Bruges, Belgium
- Interactive map of St. Salvator's Cathedral; Sint-Salvatorskathedraal

Architecture
- Type: Church
- Style: Gothic, Romanesque
- Height (max): 99 metres (325 ft) (1 tower)

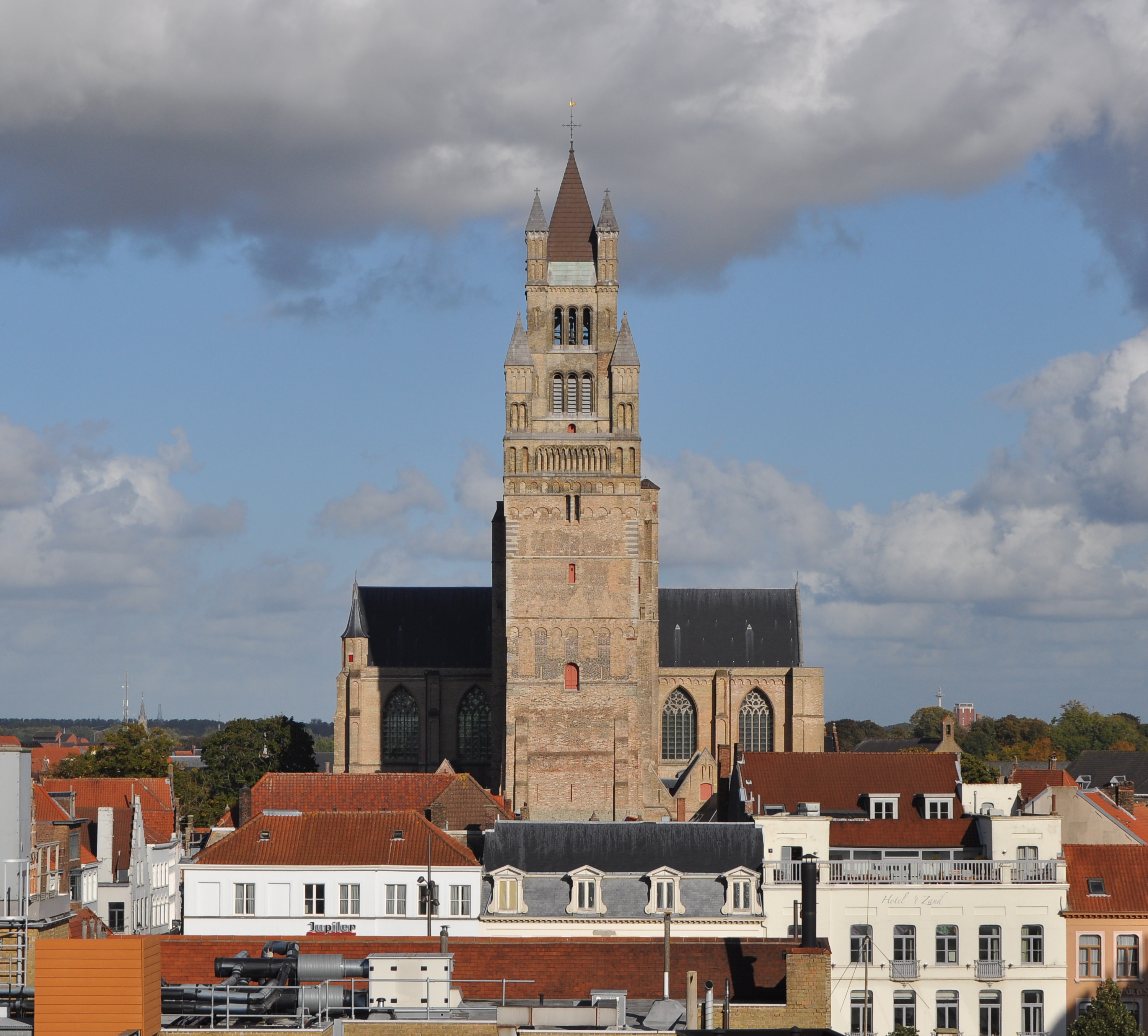
The Tower built in the 19th century

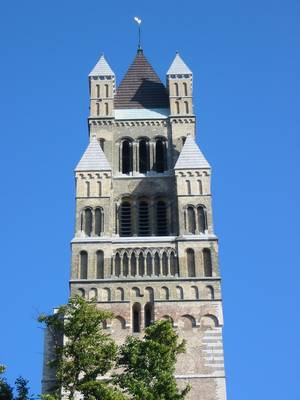
Close-up of the tower

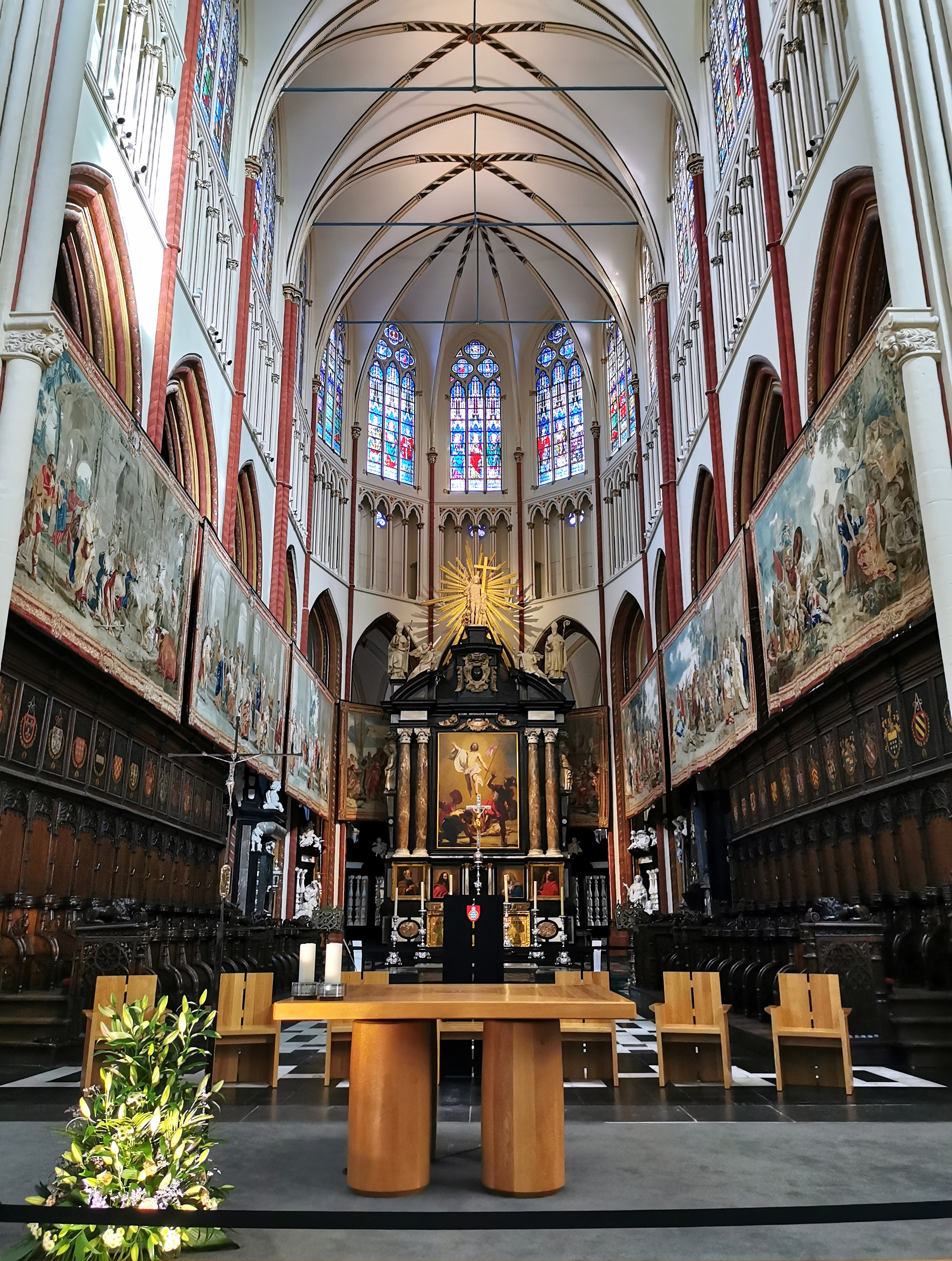
Interior

St. Salvator's Cathedral (Dutch: Sint-Salvatorskathedraal), also known as the Cathedral of the Saviour and St. Donat, is the Roman Catholic cathedral of Bruges, Belgium. The cathedral is dedicated to the Verrezen Zaligmaker (Dutch, 'risen saviour', cf. Latin salvator, 'saviour') and Saint-Donatius of Reims.

== History ==
St. Salvator, the main church of the city, is one of the few buildings in Bruges that have survived the onslaught of the ages without damage. Nevertheless, it has undergone some changes and renovations. This church was not originally built to be a cathedral; it was granted this status in the 19th century. Since the 10th century St. Salvator was a common parish church. At that time the Sint-Donaaskathedraal (St. Donatian's Cathedral), which was located at the very heart of Bruges, opposite the City Hall, was the central religious building of the city. In 1116, a new fire destroyed the building, and in 1127, the construction of a new larger church began in Romanesque style. In 1250, the construction of the present church was undertaken, which lasted for about a century. At the end of the 18th century, the French occupiers of Bruges threw out the bishop of Bruges and destroyed the Sint-Donaaskathedraal, which was his residence.

In 1834, shortly after Belgium's independence in 1830, a new bishop was installed in Bruges and St. Salvator's Church obtained the status of cathedral. However, the building's external image did not resemble a cathedral. It was much smaller and less imposing than the nearby Church of Our Lady and had to be adapted to its new role. Building a higher and more impressive tower was one of the viable options.

The roof of the cathedral collapsed in a fire in 1839. Robert Chantrell, an English architect, famous for his neo-Gothic restorations of English churches, was asked to restore St. Salvator to its former glory. At the same time, he was commissioned a project for a higher tower, in order to make it taller than that of Church of Our Lady. The oldest surviving part, dating from the 12th century, formed the base of the mighty tower. Instead of adding a neo-Gothic part to the tower, Chantrell chose a very personal Romanesque design. After completion there was a lot of criticism, and the Royal Commission for Monuments (Koninklijke Commissie voor Monumenten), without Chantrell's authorization, placed a small peak on top of the tower, because the original design was deemed too flat. The fortress-like neo-Romanesque west tower is 99 meters high.

== Interior ==
St. Salvator's Cathedral's 101-meter-long interior contains some noteworthy furnishings. It currently houses many works of art that were originally stored in its destroyed predecessor, the Sint-Donaaskathedraal. The wall-carpets that can be seen when entering the church were manufactured in Brussels by Jasper van der Borcht in 1731. These were commissioned by bishop Hendrik van Susteren for Sint-Donaaskathedraal. St. Salvator also has the original paintings that served as models for the wall-carpets.

== Music ==
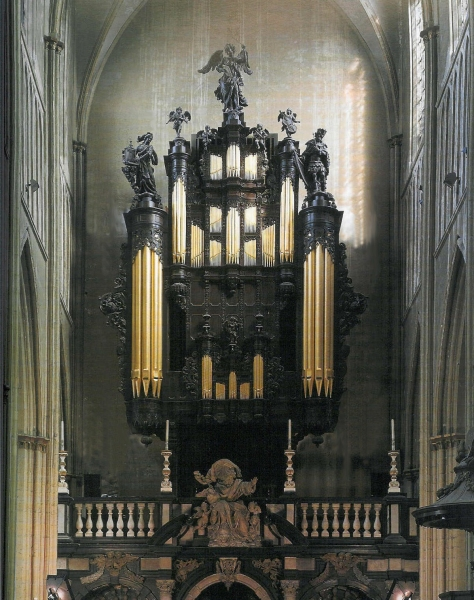
Organ of St. Salvator's Cathedral

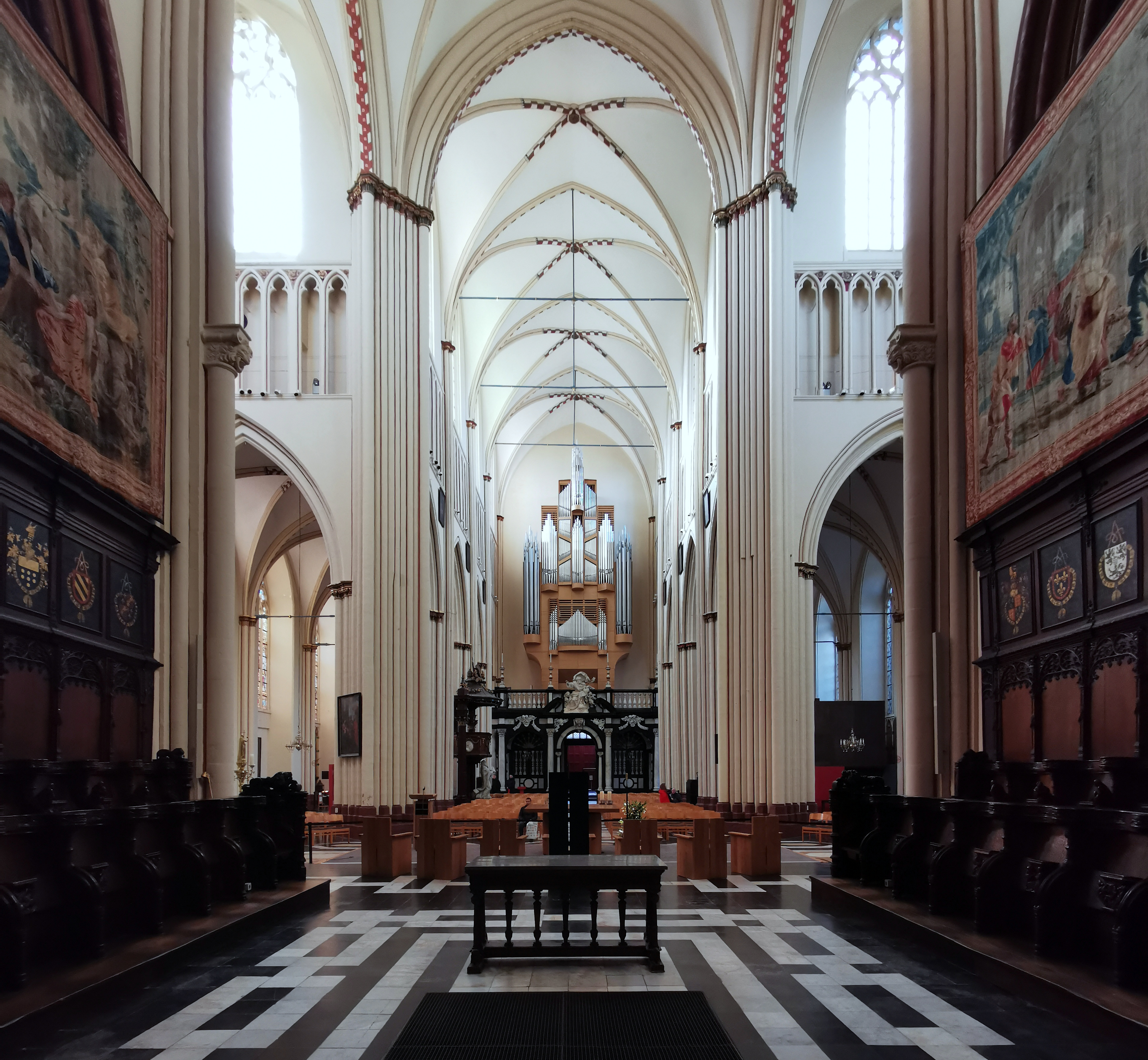
Organ of St. Salvator's Cathedral, 2023

The organ of the cathedral was originally built by Jacobus Van Eynde (1717–1719) and was expanded and rebuilt three times in the 20th century: in 1902 by L. B. Hooghuys, in 1935 by Klais Orgelbau and in 1988 by Frans Loncke & zonen. The instrument has 60 stops on three manuals and pedal. The organ is played in services and in the Kathedraalconcerten, a concert series founded in 1952. The organist is Ignace Michiels.

== See also ==
- Roman Catholic Diocese of Bruges
- List of tallest structures built before the 20th century
- Belfry of Bruges
- Bruges City Hall
