= Judith Blegen =

American soprano (1941–2026)

- Blegen, c. 1981
- Born: April 27, 1941; Lexington, Kentucky, U.S.
- Died: October 22, 2026 (aged 85); Plymouth, Massachusetts, U.S.
- Education: Curtis Institute of Music; Music Academy of the West
- Occupation: Operatic soprano
- Organizations: Staatstheater Nürnberg; Vienna State Opera; Metropolitan Opera
- Spouses: Peter Singher (m. 1967; div. 1975); Raymond Gniewek (m. 1977; died 2021)
- Relatives: Barbara Blegen (sister)

Judith Eyer Blegen (April 27, 1941 – October 22, 2026) was an American soprano who had a performance career in operas and concerts from the early 1960s into the early 1990s. She was particularly associated with the lyric coloratura soprano and soubrette literature.

Born in Kentucky and raised in Missoula, Montana, Blegen was trained at the Curtis Institute of Music (CIM) in Philadelphia. She began her opera career as an apprentice at the Santa Fe Opera in 1961 while still a student at CIM. She first drew attention as a performer at a series of annual performances at Gian Carlo Menotti's Festival dei Due Mondi from 1963 to 1966. She was a resident soprano at the Staatstheater Nürnberg (1965–1968) and the Vienna State Opera (1968–1970) before having a career at the Metropolitan Opera from 1970 until her retirement in 1991.

Blegen was also active as a concert soprano. She performed and recorded with the New York Philharmonic, the Philadelphia Orchestra, the Chicago Symphony Orchestra, the Atlanta Symphony Orchestra, and the Cleveland Orchestra. Her recordings included operas, oratorios, lieder, art songs, and other concert literature. She sang on two Grammy Award winning albums, and was nominated for the Grammy Award for Best Classical Vocal Soloist Performance. Several of her performances at the Met were filmed and broadcast on the PBS television program The Metropolitan Opera Presents.

== Biography ==
=== Early life ===
The daughter of Dr. Halward Martin Blegen and Dorothy M. Blegen (née Anderson), Judith Blegen was born in Lexington, Fayette County, Kentucky, on April 27, 1941. (Note: Some publications have incorrectly reported her date birth as 1942, 1943, 1944, or 1945. Her birth certificate record in the Kentucky, U.S., Birth Index, 1911–1999, volume 1941, certificate number 19353 states she was born in Fayette County, Kentucky on April 27, 1941. The New Grove Dictionary of Music and Musicians also has this date of birth in its entry on Judith Blegen.) She grew up in Missoula, Montana, with her sister, the pianist Barbara Blegen, and two brothers, Hal and Tim. Her parents were of Norwegian heritage. Her father was a surgeon and attending physician in Missoula who died suddenly of a heart attack at the age of 48 in 1961. Her earliest music training was received from her mother who was a violin teacher by profession. Her mother later worked as a nurse in Minneapolis, moving the Blegen family there in 1961.

Blegen was a student in the Missoula County Public Schools system, attending Paxson School and Missoula County High School (MCHS, now Hellgate High School). At MCHS she was a violinist in the school's orchestra, and by her junior year was concertmaster of that ensemble. She also sang in choirs at MCHS, and was a featured soloist at school concerts. She graduated from MCHS in 1959. She was also active as a choral singer and soloist at an Episcopal Church in Missoula that the Blegen family attended.

As a teenager, Blegen studied violin privately with Gordon Childs, a violin professor at Montana State University (MSU). She also studied singing with John L. Lester in her growing up years, beginning voice lessons at the age of 14. Lester served terms as head of the voice departments at both MSU and the University of Montana during his long career. She gave her first voice recital at MSU in January 1958 with her sister as her accompanist. In May 1958 she won first prize in the high school division of the violin concerto contest at the Greater Spokane Music Festival. That same year she was a district winner in the Metropolitan Opera National Council Auditions held in Spokane.

By the winter of 1958 Blegen was a violinist in the Missoula Civic Symphony Orchestra (MCSO, now Missoula Symphony Orchestra). In April 1959 she was a violin soloist at a music festival organized by the Montana Music Educators Association. She was the featured soprano soloist in a concert of folk songs with the MCSO in the Spring of 1959, and was featured singing Baroque opera arias in a concert with MSU's University Symphonette and Choir. She later returned to perform as a soloist with the MCSO in 1964.

=== Conservatory education and early career ===
Both Judith and her sister Barbara were awarded full scholarships to the Curtis Institute of Music (CIM) in Philadelphia where they began their studies in September 1959. Judith was awarded a voice scholarship, but was admitted with a note allowing her to continue studies in violin in conjunction with her voice studies. Her first primary teachers at CIM were Efrem Zimbalist (violin) and Eufemia Giannini-Gregory (voice). She later studied violin with Toshiya Eto and Oscar Shumsky at CIM with Giannini-Gregory remaining her only voice teacher. She graduated from CIM with a Bachelor of Arts degree in 1964.

While still a Curtis student, Blegen worked on the music staff of First Presbyterian Church, Philadelphia as their resident soprano soloist. She was a member of the chorus in the summer light opera season at Starlight Theatre in Kansas City, Missouri, in the summer of 1960. She gave a concert with her sister and harpsichordist Temple Painter at the Woodmere Art Museum in May 1961 sponsored by the Germantown Chestnut Hill Women's Committee as a fund raiser for the Philadelphia Orchestra (PO). She was an apprentice at the Santa Fe Opera (SFO) in the summer of 1961, and gave her first opera performances with the company that year as Barbarina in Mozart's The Marriage of Figaro and as the milliner in Der Rosenkavalier by R. Strauss. She toured with the SFO to Europe for a two-month period, performing with the company at a music festival in Berlin and in Belgrade, Yugoslavia.

In April 1962 Blegen won the PO's Senior Student Auditions which earned her a contract to perform with the orchestra as a soprano soloist. That same month she made her concert debut in Worcester, Massachusetts, as the soprano soloist in Fauré's Requiem and Handel's Laudate pueri Dominum (a setting of Psalm 113) with the Cantata Singers conducted by Richard Westenburg. She sang in concert with the PO on October 22, 1962, at the Academy of Music, Philadelphia, performing the mad scene from Donizetti's Lucia di Lammermoor and the aria "Großmächtige Prinzessin" from Strauss's Ariadne auf Naxos under the baton of William Smith.

In the summer of 1962 Blegen studied at the Music Academy of the West (MAW) where she starred in the title role of the school's production of Massenet's Manon which was directed by Martial Singher and performed at the Lobero Theatre. Singher was one of Blegen's teachers at CIM where he was director of the opera workshop, and was her voice teacher while at MAW. He had previously coached Blegen in the role of Susanna in The Marriage of Figaro for a workshop of that opera at CIM. In December 1962 she was the soprano soloist in Handel's Messiah with the Kemble Choir conducted by George W. Decker at Kemble Memorial United Methodist Church in Woodbury, New Jersey.

In January 1963 Blegen performed another benefit concert for the PO with her sister and tenor Alex Perkins performing excerpts from Manon, this time at the Academy Ballroom in Philadelphia. The following March she performed Brahms' Liebeslieder Waltzes as part of a vocal quartet with pianists Eleanor and Vladimir Sokoloff at the Pennsylvania Academy of Fine Arts, and was soon after featured in a concert at the Philadelphia Museum of Art. In May 1963 she was a soloist with the South Jersey Chamber Orchestra under conductor Anthony Mecoli at the Glassboro Theatre. She performed Stravinsky's Pastorale with the Philadelphia Wind Quintet (PWQ) in a concert given at the 1964 New York World's Fair, also singing with the PWQ on their 1964 album released by Columbia Records.

=== International career in the 1960s ===
After successfully auditioning for Gian Carlo Menotti and Thomas Schippers, Blegen made what was billed as her international debut at the 1963 Festival dei Due Mondi (FDM) in Spoleto, Italy, as Il Lago (the Spirit of the Lake) in Stanley Hollingsworth's opera La madre (English: The Mother). The production was directed by Sandro Sequi, conducted by Julius Rudel, and starred Mietta Sighele in the title role. The FDM was run by Menotti, and Blegen would continue to collaborate with Menotti through her career, including recording several of his operas. She returned for further performances at the FDM in 1964 and 1965, and at the 1966 FDM portrayed Mélisande in Debussy's Pelléas et Mélisande with John Reardon as Pelléas and the orchestra of the Teatro Lirico Giuseppe Verdi.

Blegen was awarded a Fulbright scholarship in 1964 which enabled her to pursue further voice studies in Europe in 1964–1965. She used the scholarship to study voice with Luigi Ricci in Rome and Germany repertoire in Munich. In 1965 she became a principal artist at the Staatstheater Nürnberg (SN), making her debut there as Olympia in Offenbach's The Tales of Hoffmann. This was followed by more than 30 performances at the SN as Rosina in Rossini's The Barber of Seville. Other roles she subsequently performed there included Susanna, Zerbinetta in Ariadne auf Naxos and the title role in Donizetti's Lucia di Lammermoor.

In 1967 Blegen gave her first performance at the Salzburg Festival as Papagena in Mozart's The Magic Flute. In April 1967 she returned to Philadelphia's Academy of Music (PAM) to perform as Lesbia in the first performance in Philadelphia of Orff's Catulli Carmina with the PO and the choirs of Temple University led by Eugene Ormandy. This work was recorded and released on Columbia Records later that same year. She sang at PAM again in 1968 as a soloist with the Camden Symphony in a concert of opera arias. In December 1968 she portrayed Monica in Menotti's The Medium with the Washington Opera Society (now Washington National Opera).

Blegen remained a resident singer at the SN until leaving in 1968 when she joined the Vienna State Opera (VSO), making her debut that year as Ännchen in Weber's Der Freischütz. She remained a resident artist through 1970 where her other repertoire included Donizetti's Adina in L'elisir d'amore and Norina in Don Pasquale, Rosina, and Zerbinetta. She was also active with the Vienna Volksoper in 1968–1969, including performing Zerlina in a new production of Auber's Fra Diavolo which was mounted specifically with her in mind.

In 1969 she appeared at the Santa Fe Opera as Emily in the United States premiere of Menotti's Help, Help, the Globolinks!, a role requiring her both to sing and play the violin. She returned to Santa Fe in 1970 to reprise the role of Emily and perform Mozart's Susanna and the title role in Stravinsky's The Nightingale. She made her European television debut on the Eurovision network as Blonde in Mozart's Die Entführung aus dem Serail under conductor Georg Solti, a production which was broadcast in 1969, directed by Heinz Liesendahl.

=== Metropolitan Opera ===
On January 19, 1970, Blegen made her debut with the Metropolitan Opera (Met) in New York City as Papagena in The Magic Flute. Shortly after this she was asked to step-in at a late notice into the role of Marzelline in Fidelio which was mounted to commemorate the 200th anniversary of Beethoven's birthday. The part of Sophie in both Massenet's Werther and Der Rosenkavalier followed this, and by the 1971–1972 she had progressed to the role of Mélisande as a substitute for Teresa Stratas. In 1973 she portrayed Ascanius in the Met's first staging of Berlioz's Les Troyens.

Blegen sang at the Met for 21 seasons in a total of 20 roles. Many of the roles she performed were from the lyric coloratura soprano and soubrette fachs. One of her more memorable performance with the company was as Donizetti's Adina to the Nemorino of Luciano Pavarotti in 1981 which was filmed and released on video tape. Some of the other roles she sang with the company included Adele in Die Fledermaus, Mozart's Blonde, Gilda in Verdi's Rigoletto, Gretel in Humperdinck's Hansel and Gretel, Juliette in Gounod's Roméo et Juliette, Nanetta in Verdi's Falstaff, Oscar in Verdi's Un ballo in maschera, and Mozart's Pamina in The Magic Flute, Susanna, and Zerlina in Don Giovanni.

=== Other performances ===
During the 1970s and 1980s, Blegen was a frequent guest on The Tonight Show Starring Johnny Carson. She appeared as Susanna at the San Francisco Opera in 1972, and at the Edinburgh Festival in 1976. She portrayed Sophie in Der Rosenkavalier for her first appearances with the Lyric Opera of Chicago in 1973, and at the Palais Garnier in Paris in 1977. In 1973 she was a soloist in Haydn's Harmoniemesse with the New York Philharmonic (NYP) as part of Leonard Bernstein's series of Haydn concerts at Lincoln Center. In 1974 she returned to the Salzburg Festival as Mozart's Blonde, and was a soloist in Bach's Mass in B minor at Avery Fisher Hall (AFH) with the New Jersey Pro Arte Chorale led by conductor John Nelson.

In 1975 Blegen made her debut at the Royal Opera House in London as Despina in Mozart's Così fan tutte. In 1976 she performed Alban Berg's Lulu Suite with the NYP led by Pierre Boulez at AFH. She later recorded this work with Boulez, a recording which garnered her a nomination for the Grammy Award for Best Classical Vocal Soloist Performance in 1981. On May 14, 1976, she was the soprano soloist in the world premiere of Menotti's Landscapes and Remembrances given at the Marcus Performing Arts Center in Milwaukee. This performances was filmed live for television broadcast. In 1979 she appeared at the Grand Théâtre de Genève as a soloist in Mahler's Symphony No. 8, a work she repeated the following year with the Boston Symphony Orchestra and conductor Seiji Ozawa.

In 1986 she returned to the VSO as Pamina in The Magic Flute, and performed Adele at La Monnaie. That same year she performed the role of Gabriel in Haydn's The Creation with the Bavarian Radio Symphony Orchestra & Chorus in a filmed recording of the oratorio under conductor Leonard Bernstein.

=== Personal and later life ===
Blegen retired from the stage in 1991, a decision partly made for safety reasons due to Blegen being stalked by a fan. She married Peter Singher, the son of her teacher Martial Singher, in Nuremberg in 1967. Her husband was an airline pilot for Cable Commuter Airlines. They had one son, Thomas Christopher Singher, who was born in April 1970; they divorced in 1975. In 1977 she married the violinist Raymond Gniewek. Gniewek was concertmaster of the Metropolitan Opera Orchestra from 1957 until his retirement in 2000. Blegen's marriage to Gniewek ended upon his death in 2021.

She was a 1983 recipient of the Montana Governor's Arts Award. Blegen died in Plymouth, Massachusetts, on October 22, 2026, at the age of 85.

== Discography ==
=== Opera recordings ===
Year	Title	Conductor, Opera house and orchestra	Cast	Label	Notes	Reference
1968	Menotti: The Medium	Jorge Mester; Chorus & Orchestra of the Opera Society of Washington	Regina Resnik (Madame Flora); Judith Blegen (Monica); Julian Patrick (Mr. Gobineau); Emily Derr (Mrs. Gobineau); Claudine Carlson (Mrs. Nolan)	CBS Records (now Sony Music)	Recorded live in 1968.	
1970	Menotti: The Old Maid and the Thief	Jorge Mester; Orchestra of Teatro Lirico Giuseppe Verdi	Margaret Baker (Miss Pinkerton); Judith Blegen (Laetitia); Anna Reynolds (Miss Todd); John Reardon (Bob)	Mercury Records		
1974	Puccini: La Bohème	Georg Solti; London Philharmonic Orchestra; John Alldis Choir	Montserrat Caballé (Mimì); Plácido Domingo (Rodolfo); Judith Blegen (Musetta); Sherrill Milnes (Marcello); Ruggero Raimondi (Colline); Vicente Sardinero (Schaunard)	RCA Red Seal	Released in Europe by BMG. Winner of the 1975 Grammy Award for Best Opera Recording.	
1976	Mozart: Le nozze di Figaro	Daniel Barenboim; English Chamber Orchestra; John Alldis Choir	Geraint Evans (Figaro); Judith Blegen (Susanna); Dietrich Fischer-Dieskau (Count Almaviva); Heather Harper (Countess Almaviva); Teresa Berganza (Cherubino); Birgit Finnilä (Marcellina)	EMI		
1982	Mozart: Zaide	Leopold Hager; Mozarteum Chamber Orchestra	Judith Blegen (Zaide); Werner Hollweg (Gomatz); Wolfgang Schöne (Allazim); Thomas Moser (Sultan Soliman); Robert Holl (Osmin)	Orfeo Records		

=== Choral and symphonic ===
Year	Title	Genre /	Musicians	Label	Notes	References
1975	Orff: Carmina Burana	cantata	Michael Tilson Thomas (conductor); Cleveland Orchestra, Chorus, & Boy Chorus; Judith Blegen (soprano); Kenneth Riegel (tenor); Peter Binder (baritone)	CBS Records (now Sony Music)	Recorded in 1974. Released in 1975. Reissued in 1990 by CBS Records Masterworks	
1975	Levine Conducts Mahler: Symphony No. 4 in G	symphony	James Levine; Chicago Symphony Orchestra; Judith Blegen (soprano)	RCA Red Seal		
1975	Haydn: Mass in B-flat, Hob. XXII: 14 Harmoniemesse	mass	Leonard Bernstein (conductor); New York Philharmonic; Westminster Choir; Judith Blegen (soprano); Frederica von Stade (mezzo-soprano); Kenneth Riegel (tenor); Simon Estes (bass); Joseph Flummerfelt (choir director)	Columbia Records	Recorded February 12, 1973. Released 1975. Later reissued on the 1992 album Die Schöpfung & Harmoniemesse	
1977	Haydn: Lord Nelson Mass	mass	Leonard Bernstein (conductor); New York Philharmonic; Westminster Choir; Judith Blegen (soprano); Gwendolyn Killebrew (mezzo-soprano); Kenneth Riegel (tenor); Simon Estes (bass)	Columbia Records	Recorded 1976	
1977	Mendelssohn: A Midsummer Night's Dream	Concert overture	Eugene Ormandy (conductor); Philadelphia Orchestra; Women of the Mendelssohn Club; Judith Blegen (soprano); Frederica von Stade (mezzo-soprano)	RCA Red Seal		
1980	Berg: Lulu Suite	Concert suite	Pierre Boulez (conductor); New York Philharmonic; Judith Blegen (soprano)	Columbia Records	Recorded May 3, 1976. Not released until 1980.	
1981	Orff: Carmina Burana	cantata	Robert Shaw (conductor); Atlanta Symphony Orchestra & Chorus; Atlanta Boy Choir; Judith Blegen (soprano); William Brown (tenor); Håkan Hagegård (baritone)	Telarc		
1982	Handel: Messiah	oratorio	Richard Westenburg (conductor); Musica Sacra Chorus & Orchestra; Judith Blegen (soprano); Katherine Ciesinski (mezzo-soprano); John Aler (tenor); John Cheek (bass)	RCA Red Seal		
1985	Mendelssohn: A Midsummer Night's Dream	Concert overture	James Levine (conductor); Chicago Symphony Orchestra and Chorus; Judith Blegen (soprano); Florence Quivar (mezzo-soprano)	Deutsche Grammophon	Recorded in 1984.	
1987	Haydn: Die Schöpfung (English: The Creation)	oratorio	Leonard Bernstein (conductor); Bavarian Radio Symphony Orchestra; Bavarian Radio Chorus; Judith Blegen (Gabriel); Lucia Popp (Eve/Eva); Thomas Moser (Uriel); Kurt Moll (Raphael); Kurt Ollmann (Adam)	Deutsche Grammophon	Recorded live in 1986	
1987	Fauré Requiem, Op. 48 /Duruflé Requiem, Op. 9	Requiem Mass	Robert Shaw (conductor); Atlanta Symphony Orchestra & Chorus; Judith Blegen (soprano); James Morris (bass)	Telarc	Winner of the Grammy Award for Best Engineered Album, Classical	

=== Studio recordings ===
Year	Title	Label	Notes	References
1975	Judith Blegen & Frederica von Stade: Songs, Arias & Duets	Columbia	Made with the Chamber Music Society of Lincoln Center.	
1976	Songs of Strauss and Wolf	RCA Red Seal	Made with pianist Martin Katz.	
1977	Baroque Aires for Soprano and Trumpet	Columbia	Blegen sings arias and cantatas by Handel and Alessandro Scarlatti with conductor Gerard Schwarz.	
1979	Mozart: Exsultate, Jubilate & Concert Arias	Columbia Masterworks	Pinchas Zukerman conducts the Mostly Mozart Orchestra in this album featuring Blegen singing a collection of Mozart's concert arias and his motet for soprano and orchestra, Exsultate, jubilate.	
1980	The Complete Music of Carl Ruggles	CBS Masterworks	Blegen sings Ruggles's "Toys" with Michael Tilson Thomas as her accompanist on this album.	
1999	The Angelic Sounds of Christmas: Music for the Glass Armonica	Musical Heritage Society	Features the glass armonica played by Blegen's sister-in-law, Cecilia Brauer. Brauer is joined on certain songs by Blegen and her husband, the violinist Raymond Gniewek.	

== Videography ==
=== Filmed operas ===
List of television appearances and roles
Title	Year	Conductor, orchestra	Cast	Notes	Ref.
Verdi: Un ballo in maschera	1980	Giuseppe Patanè; Metropolitan Opera Orchestra	Katia Ricciarelli (Amelia); Luciano Pavarotti (Riccardo); Bianca Berini (Ulrica); Judith Blegen (Oscar); Louis Quilico (Renato)	This production was staged by Elijah Moshinsky. It was recorded live on February 16, 1980, at the Metropolitan Opera House, Lincoln Center, and was telecast on that day on PBS's Live from the Metropolitan Opera. Released on VHS by Paramount Video.	
Donizetti: L'elisir d'amore	1981	Nicola Rescigno; Metropolitan Opera Orchestra	Judith Blegen (Adina); Luciano Pavarotti (Nemorino); Brent Ellis (Belcore); Sesto Bruscantini (Dr. Dulcamara); Louise Wohlafka (Giannetta)	Nathaniel Merrill staged the production at the Metropolitan Opera House. It was recorded live on March 2, 1981, and released on VHS by Paramount Video.	
R.Strauss: Der Rosenkavalier	1982	James Levine; Metropolitan Opera Orchestra	Kiri Te Kanawa (The Marschallin); Tatiana Troyanos (Octavian); Kurt Moll (Baron Ochs); Judith Blegen (Sophie); Derek Hammond-Stroud (Faninal); Barbara Smith Conrad (Annina); Luciano Pavarotti (Italian Singer)	Modified staging by Kirk Browning used for the filming at the Metropolitan Opera House in a production originally staged by Nathaniel Merrill. Filmed on October 7, 1982. Released on video by the Museum of Television & Radio.	
Humperdinck: Hansel and Gretel	1982	Thomas Fulton; Metropolitan Opera Orchestra	Frederica von Stade (Hansel); Rosalind Elias (Gretel); Jean Kraft (Gertrud); Michael Devlin (Peter); Rosalind Elias (The Witch); Diane Kesling (The Sandman); Betsy Norden (The Dew Fairy)	Directed by Kirk Browning. Filmed live at the Metropolitan Opera House on Christmas Day 1982. Released on VHS by Paramount Video.	
Johann Strauss II: Die Fledermaus	1986	Jeffrey Tate; Metropolitan Opera Orchestra	Kiri Te Kanawa (Rosalinde); Håkan Hagegård (Eisenstein); Judith Blegen (Adele); David Rendall (Alfred); Tatiana Troyanos (Prince Orlofsky); Michael Devlin (Dr. Falke); Anthony Laciura (Dr. Blind)	Directed by Otto Schenk. Filmed live at the Metropolitan Opera House on December 31, 1986. Released on video by the Museum of Television & Radio.	

=== Other ===
List of television appearances and roles
Title	Year	Performers	Notes	Ref.
The Bell Telephone Hour	1966	Judith Belgen; Shirley Verrett; John Reardon	A special episode of The Bell Telephone Hour was filmed in 1966 featuring the FFestival dei Due Mondi. Portions of Blegen's performance as Mélisande in Debussy's Pelléas et Mélisande were filmed for this television broadcast on NBC.	
Danny Kaye's Look‐in at the Metropolitan Opera	1975	Danny Kaye; Robert Merrill; Beverly Sills; Rosalind Elias; Judith Blegen; Enrico Di Giuseppe; James Morris	Comedian and actor Danny Kaye hosts this CBS television special broadcast on April 27, 1975, as part of the series The CBS Festival of Lively. Arts for Young People which gave a behind-the-scenes look at the Metropolitan Opera.	
Menotti: Landscapes and Remembrances	1976	Milwaukee Symphony Orchestra; Judith Blegen (soprano); Ani Yervanian (mezzo-soprano); Vahan Khanzadian (tenor); Gary Kendall (bass)	Cantata for soloists, chorus, and orchestra. The text is autobiographical. Filmed May 14, 1976, in Milwaukee. Telecast on PBS on November 14, 1976. Video is held in the collection at the Library of Congress.	
The Metropolitan Opera Centennial Gala	1983	Metropolitan Opera Orchestra & Chorus; James Levine (conductor); Leonard Bernstein (conductor); Richard Bonynge (conductor); Jeffrey Tate (conductor); Kathleen Battle (soprano); Judith Blegen (soprano); Grace Bumbry (soprano); Montserrat Caballé (soprano); Ileana Cotrubaș (soprano); Loretta Di Franco (soprano); Mirella Freni (soprano); Birgit Nilsson (soprano); Roberta Peters (soprano); Leontyne Price (soprano); Joan Sutherland; Gail Dubinbaum (mezzo-soprano); Marilyn Horne (mezzo-soprano); Frederica von Stade (mezzo-soprano); José Carreras (tenor); Plácido Domingo (tenor); Nicolai Gedda (tenor); James McCracken (tenor); Robert Nagy (tenor); Luciano Pavarotti (tenor); Renato Bruson (baritone); John Darrenkamp (baritone); Ara Berberian (bass); Sesto Bruscantini (bass); Nicolai Ghiaurov (bass)	On October 22, 1983, a special gala concert and celebration was held at the Metropolitan Opera House to acknowledge the 100th anniversary of the Met. This performance was filmed and telecast live on that date. It was later released on VHS by Paramount Video.	
Haydn: Die Schöpfung (English: The Creation)	1986	Leonard Bernstein (conductor); Bavarian Radio Symphony Orchestra; Bavarian Radio Chorus; Judith Blegen (Gabriel); Lucia Popp (Eve/Eva); Thomas Moser (Uriel); Kurt Moll (Raphael); Kurt Ollmann (Adam)	Filmed live at the Frauenkirche, Munich by Unitel GmbH & Co. KG. This performance was semi-staged by director Humphrey Burton. It was released on video by Deutsche Grammophon.	

== Notes and references ==
=== Bibliography ===
- Burns, Kristine Helen, ed. (2002). Women and Music in America Since 1900: An Encyclopedia. Greenwood Press. ISBN 978-1-57356-308-6.
- Cooksey, Gloria (1999). "Judith Blegen". In Brennan, Luann (ed.). Contemporary Musicians: Profiles of the People in Music. Vol. 23. Gale. ISBN 978-0-7876-2091-2.
- Ewen, David (1978). "Judith Blegen". Musicians Since 1900: Performers in Concert and Opera. H. W. Wilson Company. ISBN 978-0-8242-0565-2.
- Green, Jonathan D. (2002). A Conductor's Guide to Choral-Orchestral Works, Classical Period: Haydn and Mozart. Vol. 1. Bloomsbury Academic. ISBN 978-0-8108-4206-9.
- Green, Jonathan D.; Oertel, David W. (2019). Choral-Orchestral Repertoire: A Conductor's Guide. Rowman & Littlefield Publishers. ISBN 978-1-4422-4467-2.
- Gruber, Paul, ed. (1993). The Metropolitan Opera Guide to Recorded Opera. Metropolitan Opera Guild. ISBN 978-0-393-03444-8.
- Hamilton, David, ed. (1987). The Metropolitan Opera Encyclopedia. Simon & Schuster. ISBN 978-0-671-61732-5.
- Hixon, Donald L. (2000). Gian Carlo Menotti: A Bio-bibliography. Greenwood Publishing Group. ISBN 978-0-313-26139-8.
- Klünder, Achim; Voigt, Christina (1991). Encyclopedia of Music Theatre on TV in German-speaking Europe, 1973-1987. K. G. Saur. ISBN 978-3-598-10874-7.
- Knapp, Raymond (2003). Symphonic Metamorphoses: Subjectivity and Alienation in Mahler's Re-cycled Songs. Wesleyan University Press. ISBN 978-0-8195-6636-2.
- Kutsch, K. J.; Riemens, Leo (2003). "Blegen, Judith". In Rost, Hansjörg (ed.). Grosses Sängerlexikon. K. G. Saur Verlag. ISBN 978-3-598-44088-5.
- McCants, Clyde T. (2004). American Opera Singers and Their Recordings: Critical Commentaries and Discographies. McFarland & Company. ISBN 978-0-7864-1952-4.
- Nally, Donald; Masur, Kurt (2024). Conversations with Joseph Flummerfelt: Thoughts on Conducting, Music, and Musicians. Scarecrow Press. ISBN 978-1-4930-8215-5.
- North, James H. (2006). New York Philharmonic: The Authorized Recordings, 1917-2005. Scarecrow Press. ISBN 978-0-8108-6239-5.
- McGinnis, Pearl Yeadon (2010). The Opera Singer's Career Guide: Understanding the European Fach System. Scarecrow Press. ISBN 978-0-8108-6916-5.
- Rosenberg, Donald (2000). The Cleveland Orchestra Story: "Second to None". Gray & Company. ISBN 978-1-886228-24-5.
- Rosenberg, Kenyon C. (1990). Basic Classical and Operatic Recordings Collection on Compact Discs for Libraries: A Buying Guide. Bloomsbury Academic. ISBN 978-0-8108-2322-8.
- Summer, Robert J. (2007). Choral Masterworks from Bach to Britten: Reflections of a Conductor. Bloomsbury Academic. ISBN 978-0-8108-5903-6.
- Wlaschin, Ken (1997). Opera On Screen: A Guide to 100 years of Films and Videos Featuring Operas, Opera Singers and Operettas. Beachwood Press. ISBN 978-1-888327-00-7.
- Wlaschin, Ken (2024). "Blegen, Judith". Encyclopedia of American Opera. McFarland & Company. ISBN 978-1-4766-1238-6.
