= Barbara Blegen =

American pianist

- Born: Barbara Blegen; December 5, 1942 (age 83); Missoula, Montana
- Education: Curtis Institute of Music
- Occupation: Pianist
- Years active: 1954-2006
- Employer(s): Columbia University; Lincoln Center
- Relatives: Judith Blegen

Barbara Blegen is an American pianist of classical music. She is a former child prodigy and the sister of soprano Judith Blegen.

== Early life ==
Barbara Blegen was born in Missoula, Montana, to a musical family.^{[1]} Blegen began piano lessons with University of Montana piano professor George Hummel. Her musical aptitude inspired her sister Judith to start singing in the middle-school choir. A child prodigy, Blegen could pick out tunes on the piano from the age of four. She made her solo debut at age 11 and her orchestral debut with the Missoula Symphony Orchestra at age 12. Shortly after, she made appearances at a Music Teachers National Association conference and with the Helena Symphony.

From the age of 15, she studied at the Curtis Institute of Music in Philadelphia, studying with Rudolf Serkin for 6 years. She attended summers at the Marlboro Music School and Festival in Vermont, working with Serkin, Lee Luvisi, Aaron Copland, and Alexander Schneider. Blegen was also featured at the Festival dei Due Mondi under Gian Carlo Menotti and received a student scholarship to the Casals Festival in Puerto Rico under Pablo Casals. She was soon signed as an artist under Columbia Artists Management.

Blegen made her New York City debut with the New York Philharmonic, where she performed CPE Bach's Concerto in F major four times alongside pianist and conductor Thomas Schippers. The recording was later released on Columbia Records. She also performed in programs curated by the New York Philharmonic under Leonard Bernstein, including one of Stravinsky's art songs before a Pierre Boulez concert with the orchestra.

She has performed with orchestras including the National Symphony of the United States, St. Louis Symphony, Fort Worth Symphony, Baltimore Symphony, and others, including with conductors like Arthur Fielder and Howard Mitchell. She remained in New York for the next 30 years. Blegen also worked alongside composers Samuel Barber, Seymour Barab, Aaron Copland, and Katherine Hoover.

On receiving a Carnegie Hall recital with cellist David Fischer, Tim Page said, "the evening began rather woodenly, but by the time their energetic romp through Beethoven's Sonata in A, the two had attained an apt synergy" in The New York Times.

Blegen appeared with her sister Judith on The Tonight Show with Johnny Carson in 1976.

In 1990, she performed a concert with violinist Emanuel Vardi at the National Gallery of Art in Washington, D.C., and has also performed chamber music with clarinetist Stanley Drucker, Alexander Schneider, and Sharon Robinson.

In 2006, Blegen retired to Missoula, Montana. The University of Montana awarded Barbara and Judith Blegen a special award for their commitment to the artistic legacy of Missoula in an event titled Odyssey of the Stars. Judith’s husband, Raymond Gneiwek, appeared with them both onstage. The University of Montana also holds a scholarship in her name.
