= Musica Sacra =

Musica Sacra may refer to

- Musica sacra, a German magazine for Catholic church music
- Musica Sacra (Cambridge), a mixed choral ensemble in Cambridge, Massachusetts, United States
- Musica Sacra (New York City), a chorus in New York City, United States
- Musica Sacra (Warsaw), a choir that sings at Warsaw's St. Florian's Cathedral, Poland
- Musica Sacra, a 1724 collection of church music by William Croft
