= Justino Díaz =

Puerto Rican opera singer (born 1940)

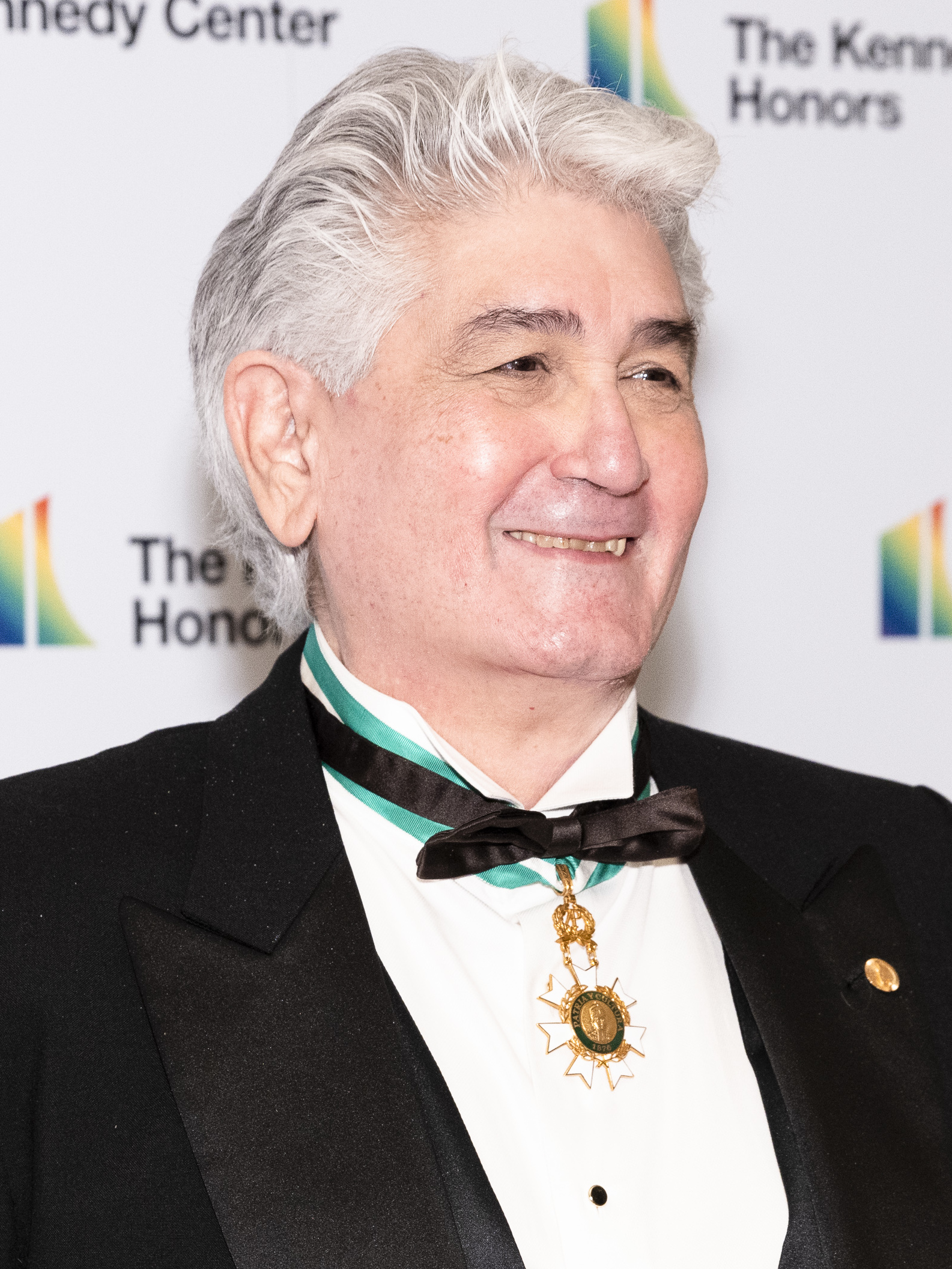
- Díaz at the 2021 Kennedy Center Honors

Background information
- Born: 29 January 1940 (age 86); San Juan, Puerto Rico
- Genre: Opera
- Occupation: Opera singer

Justino Díaz (born January 29, 1940) is a Puerto Rican operatic bass-baritone. In 1963, Díaz won an annual contest held at the Metropolitan Opera of New York, becoming the first Puerto Rican to obtain such an honor and as a consequence, made his Metropolitan debut in October 1963 in Verdi's Rigoletto as Monterone.

== Early years ==
Díaz was born in San Juan, Puerto Rico, the capital of the island, but lived and was raised in the town of Cataño. He attended Robinson Elementary School where, at the age of 8, he started to participate in the school's activities as a singer. In his first school play, when he was 10 years old, he sang the song "Old Black Joe", which became his favorite. After finishing his primary education, Díaz attended the University of Puerto Rico High School in Río Piedras. While in high school, he took singing classes and participated in various presentations around the island.

Díaz joined the choir of the University of Puerto Rico, under the direction of Augusto Rodríguez, where he sang solo. His operatic debut was in 1957 as Ben in Gian Carlo Menotti's The Telephone, or L'Amour à trois. It wasn't long before Díaz enrolled in New England Conservatory in Massachusetts. One of his professors was Boris Goldovsky, who would be very influential in his career. Díaz made his professional debut as an opera singer at the Opera Theater of New England. In 1960, Goldovsky asked Díaz to join his opera company on a 20-state tour. After the tour, he entered and participated in a competition celebrated at the Metropolitan Opera House, winning third place in the New England region.

Díaz moved to New York upon finishing his studies at the conservatory. Goldovsky recommended that he be represented by Hans J. Hoffman, a talent agent. Soon, Díaz was singing alongside other artists at the American Opera Society. He also sang with the Rochester Philharmonic Orchestra and the Boston Symphony Orchestra.

== Metropolitan Opera ==
External audio
- You may listen to Justino Díaz sing Verdi, Macbeth: Pietà, rispetto, amore on YouTube.

On March 29, 1963, Díaz won the Metropolitan Opera National Council Auditions, becoming the first Puerto Rican to obtain such an honor. As a consequence, Díaz made his Metropolitan debut in October 1963 in Verdi's Rigoletto as Monterone. He went on to sing 400 performances in 28 roles at the Metropolitan Opera, his final appearance there being Baron Scarpia in Tosca, in 1994.

Among the opera houses in which Díaz has performed are: Paris Opera, The Vienna Staatsoper; the Opera House of Salzburg; the Opera of Spoleto; the Opera of Rome; The Royal Opera House in Covent Garden; the Teatro Colón in Buenos Aires; the Zarzuela Theater of Madrid, Barcelona's Gran Teatre del Liceu and others. In 1966 he helped to inaugurate the Lincoln Center in New York City by starring opposite Leontyne Price in the opening night performance of Antony and Cleopatra by Samuel Barber.

The bass-baritone was seen at La Scala in two operas of Rossini, L'assedio di Corinto (with Beverly Sills and Marilyn Horne, 1969) and La pietra del paragone (at the Piccola Scala Arturo Toscanini, 1983 and 1983). He first appeared at the New York City Opera in Ginastera's dodecaphonic Beatrix Cenci, opposite Arlene Saunders, in 1973.

== In Puerto Rico ==
In Puerto Rico, Díaz was a frequent participant in the annual Casals Festival. He sang in the inauguration of the Luis A. Ferre Performing Arts Center in San Juan. He also played the role of Luis Muñoz Marín in the 1984 musical Fela. In 1986, Díaz played the role of Iago, opposite Plácido Domingo in Franco Zeffirelli's film adaptation of Otello. In 1967, his Escamillo in Carmen was filmed, conducted and directed by Herbert von Karajan, and also starring Grace Bumbry and Jon Vickers.

Díaz recorded Messiah, Semele and Solomon by Handel. He also recorded Lucia di Lammermoor, L'assedio di Corinto (both with Sills) and Thaïs (with Anna Moffo), as well as an album of arias of Mozart. He has also sung the role of Emile de Becque in the world-premiere recording of the complete score from Rodgers and Hammerstein's South Pacific, produced by Iván Rodríguez, who also interpreted the role of Luther Billis. He stars in this British-produced 2-CD set opposite Paige O'Hara as Nellie Forbush. In 1987, Diaz played the role onstage at Lincoln Center.

== Recognitions and awards ==
Among the recognitions and awards which Díaz has been honored with are: An Honorary Doctorate in Music from the New England Conservatory, Handel Medallion from the City of New York and The National Medal of Culture from the Institute of Puerto Rican Culture. On 20 July 2021, it was announced that Diaz would be among the five honorees at the annual Kennedy Center Honors gala.

== Repertoire ==
Repertoire
Role	Opera	Composer
Antony	Antony and Cleopatra	Barber
Don Fernando	Fidelio	Beethoven
Conte Rodolfo	La sonnambula	Bellini
Oroveso	Norma	Bellini
Giorgio	I Puritani	Bellini
An Apprentice	Wozzeck	Berg
Escamillo	Carmen	Bizet
Mefistofele	Mefistofele	Boito
Khan Konchak	Prince Igor	Borodin
Stromminger	La Wally	Catalani
Creonte	Medea	Cherubini
Raimondo	Lucia di Lammermoor	Donizetti
Francesco	Beatrix Cenci	Ginastera
Méphistofélès	Faust	Gounod
Frère Laurent	Romeo e Giulietta	Gounod
Palémon	Thaïs	Massenet
Nelusko	L'africana	Meyerbeer
Seneca	L'incoronazione di Poppea	Monteverdi
Figaro	Le nozze di Figaro	Mozart
Don Giovanni, Commendatore	Don Giovanni	Mozart
Sarastro, Guardia	Die Zauberflöte	Mozart
Boris	Boris Godunov	Mussorgsky
Gonnario	I Shardana	Porrino
Alvise	La Gioconda	Ponchielli
Colline	La bohème	Puccini
Scarpia, Angelotti	Tosca	Puccini
Jack Rance, Jake Wallace	La fanciulla del West	Puccini
Conte Asdrubale	La pietra del paragone	Rossini
Don Basilio	Il barbiere di Siviglia	Rossini
Maometto	L'assedio di Corinto	Rossini
Abimelech	Samson et Dalila	Saint-Saëns
Un Soldato	Salome	Strauss
Gremin	Eugene Onegin	Tchaikovsky
Zaccaria	Nabucco	Verdi
Macbeth	Macbeth	Verdi
Conte	Luisa Miller	Verdi
Rigoletto, Sparafucile, Monterone	Rigoletto	Verdi
Grenvil	La Traviata	Verdi
Giovanni da Procida	I vespri siciliani	Verdi
Simon Boccanegra, Fiesco, Paolo	Simon Boccanegra	Verdi
Padre Guardiano	La forza del destino	Verdi
Rodrigo, Il Grande Inquisitore, Friar	Don Carlo	Verdi
Amonasro, Ramfis, Il Re	Aida	Verdi
Iago, Lodovico	Otello	Verdi
Night Watchman	Die Meistersinger von Nürnberg	Wagner
Titurel	Parsifal	Wagner

== Filmography ==
Among the films and television appearances made by Díaz are the following:

- Callas Forever - 2002 - as Scarpia
- "When the Fire Burns: The Life and Music of Manuel de Falla - 1991 - as "Don Quixote" (in El Retablo de Maese Pedro)

... a.k.a. "Life and Death of Manuel de Falla" (USA) ... a.k.a. "The Life and Music of Manuel de Falla" (USA: short title)

- Otello - 1986 - as Iago
- Carmen - 1967 - as Escamillo

=== Television appearances ===
- 1977 - Sparafucile in a Metropolitan Opera Rigoletto
- 1981 - Oroveso in Norma
- 1988 - Nélusko in L'africaine
- 1991 - Iago in Act 3 of Otello in The Metropolitan Opera Gala 1991
- 1992 - Don Quixote in El Retablo de Maese Pedro
- 1995 - Juanillo in El Gato Montés El

== Later years ==
On March 29, 2003, Díaz retired after 48 years in opera. However, before he made his last presentation at the Luis A. Ferre Performing Arts Center, he sang for the last time in public with his University of Puerto Rico alumni chorus the song "Old Black Joe", the same song that he sang at the Robinson Elementary School when he was 8 years old, Díaz and fellow Puerto Rican pianist Elías López-Sobá were, from 2003 to 2009, the artistic and musical directors of the Casals Festival, a classical music event held annually in San Juan, Puerto Rico.

Justino Diaz is married to Ilsa Rodriguez. He has two daughters by a previous marriage: Helen Hayes Award-winning stage and screen actress Natascia Diaz and dancer/composer Katya Diaz.

== See also ==
- List of Puerto Ricans
