= Tritle =

Tritle may refer to:

- Frederick Augustus Tritle (1833–1906), American politician and Governor of Arizona Territory (1882–1885)
- Kent Tritle, American choral conductor and organist
- Mount Tritle, a peak in the Bradshaw Mountains
