= Bardenhewer =

Bardenhewer is a German surname. Notable people with the surname include:

- Otto Bardenhewer (1851–1935), German Catholic patrologist
- Werner Bardenhewer (1929–2019), German Catholic priest
