= Casals Festival =

Annual classical music event in San Juan, Puerto Rico

Coordinates: 18.4471°N 66.0683°W

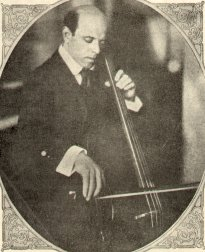
Pablo Casals, 1922

The Casals Festival is a classical music event celebrated every year in San Juan, Puerto Rico, in honor of classical musician Pablo Casals. When the festival first started, the majority of the musicians contracted by the festival orchestra for the event came from the United States. Some of the exceptions to this practice were Jesús María Sanromá, Henry Hutchinson Sr., Fernando Valenti and Narciso Figueroa and his brothers. Plays by authors like Mahler, Strauss, Prokofiev, Hidensmith, Debussy, De Falla, Stravinsky, Bartok, Ginastera, Chávez, Copland and Ravel were feature during the first 12 years under Castro and Tevah. By 1970, the majority of the members of the festival's orchestra were Puerto Ricans.

== History ==
=== Arrival of Casals to Puerto Rico ===
Pablo Casals (1876–1973), was born in Spain to a Puerto Rican mother Pilar Defilló. He was a cello player and a supporter of the Spanish Republican Government and as such came to odds with Generalisimo Francisco Franco when the Spanish Republican Government was overthrown. Casals went to live in the French village of Prades. There he established the Prades Festival. Casals visited Puerto Rico in 1955 and in 1956. The island also hosted the marriage of Casals and Marta Montañez, putting end to public speculation in 1955.

In 1956, Casals moved permanently to the island. He was scheduled to inaugurate the festival which bears his name. The inauguration of the festival was held in the University of Puerto Rico Theater. Casals, who was supposed to perform Suite Number 3 in C major, for solo cello by Johann Sebastian Bach, fell ill and suffered a heart attack during the rehearsals. Even though Casals was hospitalized, the event went on as scheduled with the performance of pianist Rudolf Serkin.

=== Creation and early years ===
The cultural work of the Institute of Puerto Rican Culture (ICP) convinced Teodoro Moscoso to push for the creation of Casa del Libro and the Casals Festival. The event was officially founded in 1956 by Pablo Casals. It was promoted by Moscoso and David Ogilvy with the objectives of changing the image of Puerto Rico and promoting tourism to the island during off-peak tourism time. After implementing Operation Bootstrap, Teodoro Moscoso employed advertiser David Ogilvy to propagate the image of a people engaged in a cultural renaissance. Teodoro Moscoso's decisive actions at critical junctures (such as his success in pushing tax exemptions and tourism in the late 1940s) and his personal persuasiveness, as with Pablo Casals, who at the age of 80 was persuaded to establish the Casals Festival at San Juan.

Festival Casals, Inc. was formally registered at the Departamento de Estado on April 20, 1956. Fomento wholly owned the new entity. Despite not residing at Puerto Rico, adviser Abe Fortas was given a place in the entity's board of directors. The format was based on its predecessor at Prades. Prior to the 1957 festival, José Gueits was contracted as auxiliary administrator and Alfredo Matilla as technical consultant. In a letter to Abe Fortas, Passalaqua acknowledged that "The Casals Festival is, in a way, Part of Operation Bootstrap". When writing to Fortas, Passalaqua made the same assertion while discussing private financing. And historian Rafael Aponte Ledée argued that its main role was to provide cultural activities that would be familiar to the wave of foreign investors settling at Puerto Rico during the industrialization wave.

Both Schneider and Pasalaqua felt that Casals' decision to play in Puerto Rico was one of weight, since he had promised not to play in any country that reestablished diplomatic ties with the Francoist Spain and the territorial status placed the island within the American jurisdiction. Aponte Ledée argues that by doing so, he allowed Muñoz Marín to successfully argue that the Commonwealth was no longer a colony. For his participation, Casals received a salary of $25,000, plus the use of his surname as the central element of the title. In 1957, journalist Henry Raymont arrived to Puerto Rico with interest in the festival, and he was integrated to the scholarship committee. He was given logistic participation along Fortas and was among those that argued using The San Juan Music Festival Fellowships to bring foreign talent that would attend courses and serve as witnesses of the rehearsals and concerts, citing a belief that there was "no large group of students" that could take the role due to an apparent lack of knowledge about the schools affiliated to the Escuela Libre de Música program or the work of the ICP.

Ricardo Alegría, the president of the Institute of Puerto Rican Culture (ICP) who had discussed with Casals the possibility of hosting the Prades Festival at Puerto Rico in 1956, was highly interested in the festival's development but would become one of its critics, in particular for the amount of money that it received to fund an all-foreign Orquesta and for the lack of locals pieces. Furthermore, the ICP's attempts to establish a symphonic orchestra dates back to 1956 and did not receive the support that Casals received. In a subsequent interview, Alegría himself recalled that when the Festival Orquesta participated in a ICP sponsored concert, he had to threaten the director to play Amaury Veray's De Profundis, after which the musician demonstrated disgust.

In response, the ICP held the 1958 Puerto Rican Theater Festival, which was well received by the media and said to rival the display of the Casals Festival. This fueled a competition between the agency and Fomento over cultural matters. Critic Donald Thompson would later call this early stage the "most heavily concentrated focus of American presence in the arts ever to be felt in PR", noting that "for many years [the Festival was] planned and staffed in New York City with performers assembling in San Juan [...] for three weeks of concerts".

Festival Casals Inc. received contracts with the American Federation of Musicians and Fomento managed the money assigned for the entity through Rafael Benítez Carle. By 1959, the local presence was being felt in the form of the UPR's chorus (following director Augusto Rodríguez integration to the Conservatorio as a professor), which closed the festival with Beethoven's Choral Fantasy. Their performance earned them a ten-minute standing ovation of the public. Casals later expressed satisfaction with Rodríguez's work. The director would later be invited to lead his chorus at Madrid, requesting whatever cooperation the Conservatorio could offer from José Gueits. At the 1960 Festival, Schneider replaced the University of Puerto Rico's (UPR) chorus with that of the University of Maryland and had them perform Choral Fantasy for the second consecutive year. The move costes the government "a expense of at least $25,000", which he justified by citing that he did not want to work with Rodríguez and instead wanted "a good chorus from the States" to perform El Pessebre.

In April 1961, Henry Raymont participated in the failed Bay of Pigs Invasion and was jailed. José Trías Monge wrote to Fortas informing him of the development and its relevance to the scholarship committee of Festival Casals, then led by Guillermo Espinosa and which also included Sasha Schneider. Another committee was created, including Jaime Benítez, Carlos Passalaqua, José A. Mora, Guillermo Espinosa and David Heft. During this time, the Pablo Casals Foundation emerged at Santurce, Puerto Rico (despite no record of its status appearing in the Puerto Rico Department of State), organizing another "Homenaje a Pablo Casals" fund raising dinner on January 20, 1962. The committee behind the use of funds included mention of Albert Schweitzer and the Queen of Belgium. Towards the end of the year, Marta Casals contacted Abe Fortas about more people joining the donations for the foundation, in particular one John Kadis. She was form that any money that was to be paid to Casals himself for his appearances should be directed to the foundation instead. The foundation fixed their fee for European countries lower "according to their possibilities". The ambiguous nature of the foundation led to income tax trouble for the Casals.

On May 3, 1962, R. Palmer Baker Jr. of Lord, Day & Lord wrote to the commissioner of Internal Revenue requesting that "the foregoing application [for Festival Casals Inc.] be expedited and given priority status" in order to secure contributions of around $50,000 for the entity. The request failed and The Committee of Friends of the Conservatory of Music of Puerto Rico (presided by Richard S. Perkins) was organized to host the event where these donations were expected, "A dinner in honor of Pablo Casals" held on June 25. Although checks were directed to the Conservatorio, Abe Fortas made his for Festival Casals Inc. with a side note. The Internal Revenue Service later removed the "for profit" status of Festival Casals Inc. due to its peculiar status as a government corporation under the Commonwealth. In 1963, Harold Toppel took over as president of The Committee of Friends of the Conservatory of Music of Puerto Rico, organizing another fundraising dinner with the Festival Orquesta as a special attraction on June 17, 1963.

On September 3, 1963, José Buitrago wrote a letter to Muñoz Marín criticizing the work of Schneider, noting that he opposed and failed to fulfill the plan to use more Puerto Rican talents and that he lobbied to separate the Conservatorio and Sinfónica from Festival Casals if local talent was allowed. He argued that the foreign presence in the Sinfónica was responsible for it failing to be adopted by the public of the island as their own, while Schneider's own interest to project himself internationally disregarded the development of music. Muñoz Marín summoned Schneider, who arrived to Puerto Rico two days later, and attended a reunion with the governor and Juan Manuel García Passalacqua. The participation of the Sinfónica in ballet and opera was postponed until it was ready. Muñoz Marín declined separating the three entities and expressed that the type of music in the festival should not be limited and that the integration of more Puerto Ricans to the International tours of the Sinfónica should be handled as "it [could be] justified".

=== Format changes ===
On April 10, 1965, Fortas left the Fundación Pablo Casals, following the creation of the National Council of the Arts, but retaining his place in the board of Corporación Casals. In July-August 1969, Festival Casals sponsored shows by Ángeles Nieto's Taller de Ópera which included Madame Butterfly and La serva padrona. Pablo Casals died on October 22, 1973. His widow Marta Casals who was the president of the musical committee and Co-Chairman of the board and music director until 1979, undertook to continue the annual event. The festival has now taken on a new dimension with the appointment of pianist and scholar Elías López-Sobá and bass/baritone Justino Díaz as artistic and musical directors. These two Puerto Rican artists have continued to follow the legacy of Pablo and Marta Casals, attracting many musicians for a series of concerts. The festival which is now held at the Luis A. Ferre Performing Arts Center in San Juan, celebrated its 50th anniversary in 2006 with a performance of the Philadelphia Orchestra under the musical direction of maestro Christoph Eschenbach.

In 1975, Schneider resigned his position of musical director, being replaced by Marta Casals, who also controlled the festival's office at New York. Elías López became president and Andrés Quiñones (who also worked in the Puerto Rico Conservatory of Music) vice-president. In May 1976, the legislature considered a governor-sponsored Project No. 1653 sent to them by Rafael Hernández Colón which proposed creating another Fundación Pablo Casals, unrelated to the previous entity that held the name, with the proposal being defeated. The initiative had faced opposition from the personnel of the Conservatorio and the Sinfónica. On October 29, 1977, Marta Casals and Elías López left Festival Casals. In the ensuing fallout, board president Enrique Rodríguez Negrón replaced Moscoso, José Rovira Sánchez, Passalaqua and José Figueroa Colón. The entity also faced lawsuits by Rafael Aponte and Frederick King, the first based on the perceived discrimination against Puerto Rican Musicians at the Conservatorio and the second for contract violations.

Assistant director Alexander Scneider expressed in an interview that "[it] was not a Casals Festival of Puerto Rico, but a Casals Festival in Puerto Rico". Abraham Peña, then president of the Federación de Músicos de Puerto Rico, was also critical of the event and made demands to the legislature, along a group of members of the Conservatorio who demanded equal salary to that of foreign musicians. Hearings were held on May 18-25, July 6 and August 10. Senator María Arroyo de Colón, then in charge of the Commission on Instruction and Culture, recognized the situation. On May 19, 1979, the cancellation of the upcoming festival was announced, amidst a strike by the Sinfónica. The strike led to then president of the Senate of Puerto Rico to make a call for "promotion of Arts as a goal", which preceded the approval of several laws altering the musical and cultural landscape the following year, replacing Festival Casals Inc. with the Administración para el Fomento de las Artes y la Cultura. Among them were Law 44 which created the Corporación de la Orquesta Sinfónica de Puerto Rico and Law 77 which created the Corporación del Conservatorio de Música de Puerto Rico, both of them falling under the new umbrella, along the festival itself.

Hernández Colón offered Alegría control of Festival Casals Inc. to the ICP, but the existence of deficit led to a lack of interest in the offer. The Prades Festival established by Casals in France in 1950 was renamed the Pablo Casals Festival in 1982. During the 21st Century, the Puerto Rico Symphonic Orchestra became the main emphasis of the Festival Casals.

== Participants ==
Amongst the musical directors who have participated in the festival besides Casals are Mstislav Rostropovich, Leonard Bernstein, Zubin Mehta, Eugene Ormandy, Sir John Barbirolli, Yehudi Menuhin, Barbara Blegen and recently Krzysztof Penderecki.

The artistic direction of the festival has been under the following "maestros" at one time or another: Jorge Mester, Odón Alonso, Mstislav Rostropovich, Krzysztof Penderecki, Elías López Sobá, Justino Diaz and presently under Maximiano Valdés.
