= Werner Bardenhewer =

German Catholic priest, founder of charity organization

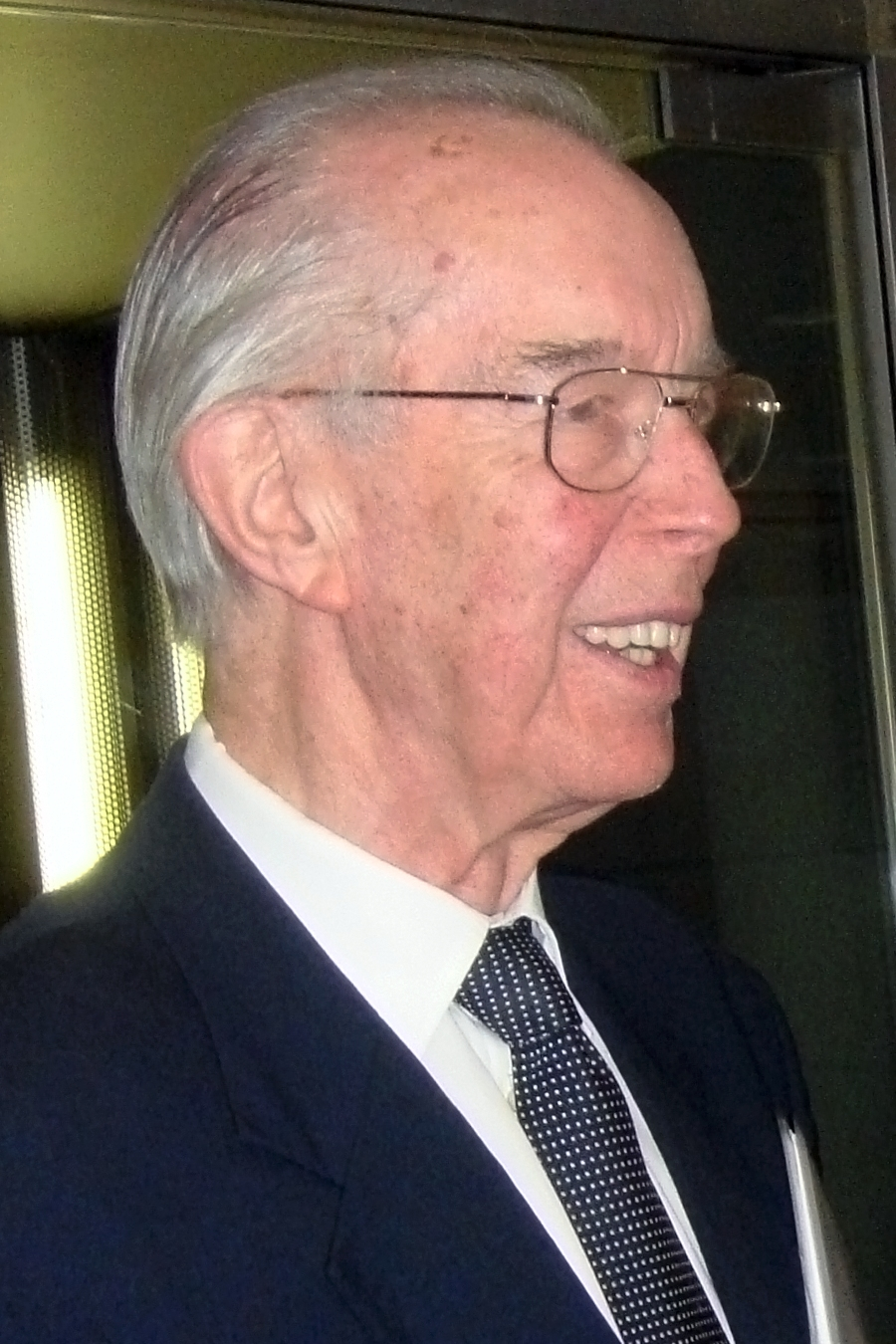
- Bardenhewer in 2012
- Born: Joseph Werner Bardenhewer; 30 January 1929; Arnsberg, Westphalia, Germany
- Died: 10 April 2019 (aged 90); Wiesbaden, Hesse, Germany
- Education: Diltheyschule; Philosophisch-Theologische Hochschule Sankt Georgen
- Occupation: Priest
- Organizations: africa action / Deutschland
- Awards: Order of merit of Burkina Faso

Ecclesiastical career
- Church: Catholic
- Ordained: 8 December 1955
- Congregations served: St. Bonifatius, Wiesbaden
- Offices held: Dean of Wiesbaden; Priest of Eibingen Abbey

Joseph Werner Bardenhewer (30 January 1929 – 10 April 2019) was a German Catholic priest. He was Dean of Wiesbaden, the state capital of Hesse, at the central parish St. Bonifatius from 1974 to 1996. He served for two years at the Eibingen Abbey founded by Hildegard of Bingen. In 1999, he founded the Wiesbaden chapter of the charity organisation africa action, which provides help in health care and education in countries of the Sahel region. He was active as a priest until his death, and had traveled to West Africa to contact its partner organizations. He received Burkina Faso's highest national award, the Knight of the country's National Order, in 2016.

== Early life ==
Born Joseph Werner Bardenhewer in Arnsberg on 30 January 1929, Bardenhewer moved with his family to Wiesbaden in 1937, where he attended the Diltheyschule. He studied at the Philosophisch-Theologische Hochschule Sankt Georgen and in Fribourg, Switzerland. He was ordained a priest by Bishop Wilhelm Kempf on 8 December 1955.

== Religious career ==
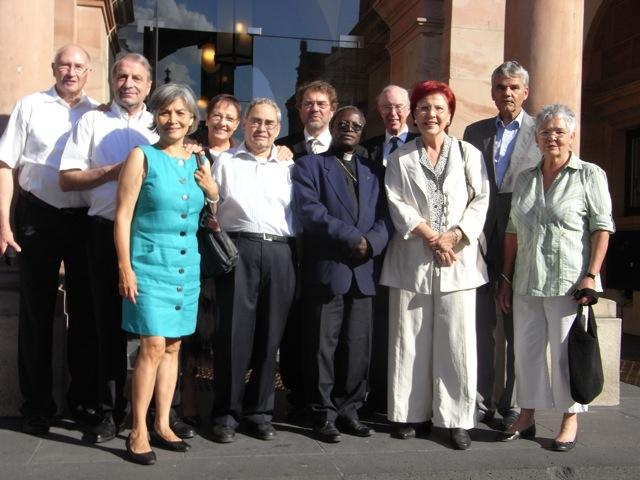
Bardenhewer (fourth from right) between Bishop Ambroise Ouédraogo from Maradi, Niger, and Heidemarie Wieczorek-Zeul with members of the board of Africa Action in Wiesbaden in 2011

His first position was as Kaplan (assisting priest) in Nauort from 1 January 1956. In mid-1959, he was called to the administration of the Diocese of Limburg by Alexander Stein, to serve as the Diözesansekretär of the Sozialreferat (Department for Social Affairs). From 1962, he was a priest for the Berufsschule in Wiesbaden. From 1967, he was vicar of the Wiesbaden parish St. Andreas and became its parish priest on 1 November 1968. Simultaneously, he was the dean of the section Wiesbaden-Mitte from 1971 to 1974. He co-founded an ecumenical association, Arbeitsgemeinschaft Sozialer Brennpunkt (Working group social focal point), in close collaboration with the Protestant parish of Matthäus, political parties, schools and social groups.

Bardenhewer was the parish priest of Wiesbaden central Catholic parish St. Bonifatius, Wiesbaden, from 16 June 1974 until his retirement on 31 January 1996. The officeholder has traditionally also been dean of Wiesbaden. His focus was social work, both in the parish and beyond, the deepening of faith in services and especially a 1992 action "Aufbruch '92", and spiritual communication in several groups in the parish. He was inspired by the Second Vatican Council and named the new parish house "Roncalli-Haus" after Pope John XXIII. He was president of the local Caritas organization and on the board of St. Josefs-Hospital. After his retirement at age 67, Bardenhewer served for two years as the Spiritual, the priest of Eibingen Abbey in Rüdesheim, which Hildegard of Bingen had founded.

== Humanitarian activities ==
After his return to Wiesbaden, Bardenhewer founded a charity organisation in 1999, the Freundeskreis Wiesbaden, the Wiesbaden group of africa action / Deutschland, which supports health care, especially fighting blindness, and education in the countries of the Sahel. The initiative came from a prisoner sentenced to life imprisonment who was in Bardenhewer's care. The man had seen on TV that in Africa, eye surgery for only DM 30 (US $15) could help a blind patient to see. With the help of Caritas, Bardenhewer connected the group in Wiesbaden to the existing Ghana action. The Wiesbaden group made it possible to build five eye clinics in Burkina Faso, Mali and Niger and enabled young people to study ophthalmology or train to be opticians. The fifth clinic in Mopti, Mali, was named after Bardenhewer in 2011, "Centre ophtalmologique Père Joseph Werner Bardenhewer". He published a book by the cardinal of Burkina Faso, Philippe Ouédraogo, translated into German as Gott allein genügt (God alone suffices) by Stefanie Götzmann in 2018.

Bardenhewer traveled to West Africa, seeking direct contact with the institutions there, such as in 2018 to Burkina Faso. He was known there as Père Joseph. A street in the capital Ouagadougou was named after Wiesbaden to honor the help from the Wiesbaden group. In 2016, Bardenhewer was awarded the highest award of Burkina Faso, Knight of the National Order. He celebrated his 90th birthday in a monastery in Burkina Faso, as part of one of his project journeys. On 24 February 2019, he celebrated a mass of thanks at Mariä Heimsuchung in Wiesbaden-Dotzheim.

== Death ==
Bardenhewer died on 10 April 2019 in a hospital in Wiesbaden. He was buried at the Wiesbaden Südfriedhof on 23 April by Johannes zu Eltz, after a Requiem ("Resurrection Mass") at St. Bonifatius.
