= Richard Westenburg =

American choral conductor

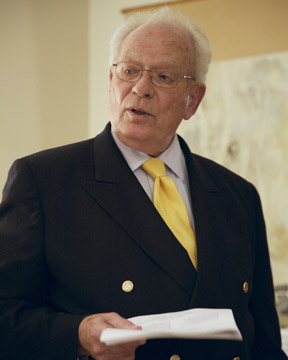
Richard Westenburg

Richard Westenburg (April 26, 1932, Minneapolis – February 20, 2008, Norwalk, Connecticut) was a lauded American choral conductor. He notably founded the Musica Sacra Chorus and Orchestra in 1964, serving as its director until 2007 when Kent Tritle took over as director. He also founded the Basically Bach Festival at Lincoln Center in 1979, running the festival for a decade. He served as the music director of the Collegiate Chorale from 1973 to 1979 and was a popular lecturer at the Metropolitan Museum of Art from 1979 to 1982.

Westenburg also served on the faculties of several universities. He taught choral music and conducting at the Mannes College of Music from 1971 to 1977, was the head of the choral department at the Juilliard School from 1977 to 1989, and was on the music faculty at Rutgers University from 1986 to 1992.
