= Elías López Sobá =

Puerto Rican pianist and educator (1927–2023)

- Born: 17 April 1927; Ponce, Puerto Rico
- Died: 14 August 2023 (aged 96) Coral Gables, Florida, U.S.
- Genres: Classical
- Occupations: Pianist; Co-director of the Casals Festival

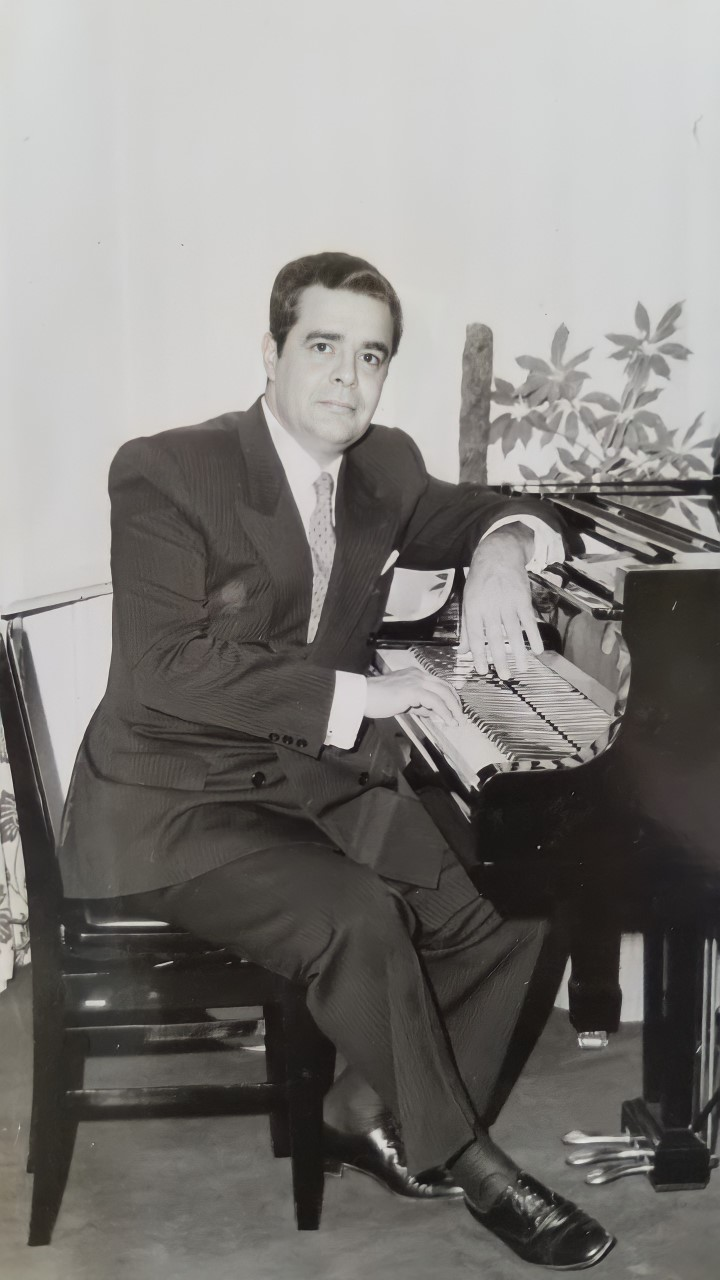
Elías López Sobá

Elías López Sobá (17 April 1927 – 14 August 2023) was a Puerto Rican classical music pianist and educator. Together with musical director Justino Diaz, Elias López Sobá co-directed the annual Casals Festival from 2010. Some sources considered him one of the most outstanding pianists and instrumentalists in 20th century Puerto Rico.

== Early years ==
López Sobá was born in Ponce, Puerto Rico on 17 April 1927.

== Training ==
López Sobá attended the Longy School of Music in Massachusetts, graduating in 1951. He also studied at the Bennington College of the University of Vermont, where he graduated with a Master of Arts. In 1953 he obtained a Fulbright scholarship which allowed him to continue studies in piano at the Academy of the music of Vienna, under Alfred Brendel and Zubin Mehta and where he graduated magna cum laude, winning the first medal in the international music competition in 1955. He then moved to Italy to enhance his piano skills under Arturo Benedetti Michelangeli. In 1961 he returned to Puerto Rico to teaching in the Faculty of Humanities of the University of Puerto Rico. Between 1965 and 1967 López Sobá completed his Master of Music degree at Boston University.

== Music career ==
In 1967 López Sobá was named director of the Department of Social and Cultural Studies of the University of Puerto Rico, a position which held until 1975. Between 1973 and 1980, he directed the corporation responsible for organizing the Festival Casals. Between 1985 and 1993, he chaired the Institute of Puerto Rican Culture and the music section of the Ateneo Puertorriqueño.

=== Performing career ===
López Sobá played as a soloist in numerous orchestras, including the Boston Symphony Orchestra and the Puerto Rico Symphony Orchestra and Venezuela Symphony Orchestra, and regularly participated in concerts, recitals and musical conferences around the world, especially in Central America, United States and Western Europe. In 1986 he obtained the doctorate in philosophy and literature from the University of Valladolid. In 1995 he won the gold medal at the international competition of music interpretation in Geneva.

== Death ==
Elías López Sobá died in Coral Gables, Florida on 14 August 2023, at the age of 96.

== See also ==
- List of Puerto Ricans
- List of people from Ponce, Puerto Rico
