= Francis Menotti =

American actor

Francis "Chip" Menotti (born Francis Phelan in Philadelphia, Pennsylvania, United States in 1938) is an actor and former figure skater who was the president and artistic director of Festival dei Due Mondi.

== Early years and personal life ==
Born in Philadelphia to sports journalist Francis J. Phelan, Francis Menotti grew up in Ardmore, Pennsylvania and is a graduate of Saint Thomas More High School in Allentown, Pennsylvania. An avid ice skater since the age of 9, he became a professional skater after high school in the late 1950s with the Ice Follies, with whom he toured for two years . He briefly studied at the Goodman Theater in Chicago, but left after just over a month of coursework. He moved to New York City's Lower East Side and studied the Stanislavsky Method with Lee Strasberg and Paula Strasberg.

Francis Menotti began his career in the theater as a stage manager for the 1963 national tour of Here Today starring Tallulah Bankhead. His first on-stage role was at the DuPont pavilion of the 1964 New York World's Fair in New York City, in a one-act industrial theatre play directed by Herbert Machiz in which Francis mixed chemicals on-stage. It was around this time that Pulitzer Prize-winning composer Gian Carlo Menotti and Francis met, but there are conflicting accounts describing how the acquaintance was made. In one interview, Menotti stated he pulled an unanswered envelope randomly out of a large stack of mail at the Spoleto Festival's New York office in which was a letter from Francis requesting a job interview. However, Menotti's biographer, John Gruen, writes that the two met after Francis was awarded a scholarship with the Spoleto Festival. Still a third account, by Menotti's ex-secretary, claimed that Menotti was introduced to Francis by Broadway stage manager Richard Evans.

Regardless of which account is accurate, Francis moved into Menotti's East Side apartment in 1965. In 1974, Gian Carlo legally adopted Francis, known as Chip, as his son. Francis Phelan took the last name of Menotti. From the mid-1960s on, Francis mainly performed with productions connected to Menotti, with the exception of an appearance at the American Shakespeare Festival. Many of these roles were written specifically for him, including the title role in the stage play The Leper which premiered in 1970 at Florida State University. He reprised that role at the Spoleto Festival USA in 1982. Three years earlier he had appeared at that same festival as the mime Toby in Menotti's The Medium, a role he also recorded on film for French television. In 1976 he originated the role of Anger, a speaking role, in Menotti's opera The Egg; a role he reprised at the Festival dei Due Mondi in 1978. Menotti's 1980 children's opera, Chip and His Dog is named for him. Other operas he appeared in, all in non-singing roles, include The Saint of Bleecker Street and The Boy Who Grew Too Fast.

On August 24, 1985, at Yester Parish Church, in Gifford, East Lothian, Scotland, Francis Menotti married Malinda Fitler Murphy (1960–2005), the youngest daughter of Dr. James S. Murphy and his former wife, Happy, the widow of Nelson Aldrich Rockefeller. Gian Carlo Menotti's nearby home, Yester House, was given to the couple as a wedding present.

The Menottis had two sons, Claudio (born 1987) and Cosimo (born 1991). Malinda Menotti died on 24 October 2005.

== Festival dei Due Mondi ==
Francis Menotti is perhaps best known for his past involvement with the Festival dei Due Mondi in Spoleto, Italy, which his father, Gian Carlo Menotti, founded in 1958. He was named president of the Festival in 1994, and artistic director in 1999. In his will, Gian Carlo Menotti bequeathed the Festival to his son. However, after the death of Gian Carlo in February 2007, Francis was ousted from the organization and the culture minister of the Italian government appointed politician Giorgio Ferrara to run the festival. The Festival's attendance has consistently declined since the Menotti family was ousted under Giorgio Ferrara and Monique Veaute, with the festival stating in 2022 that 25,000 tickets were sold
