= St. Bonifatius, Wiesbaden =

St. Bonifatius
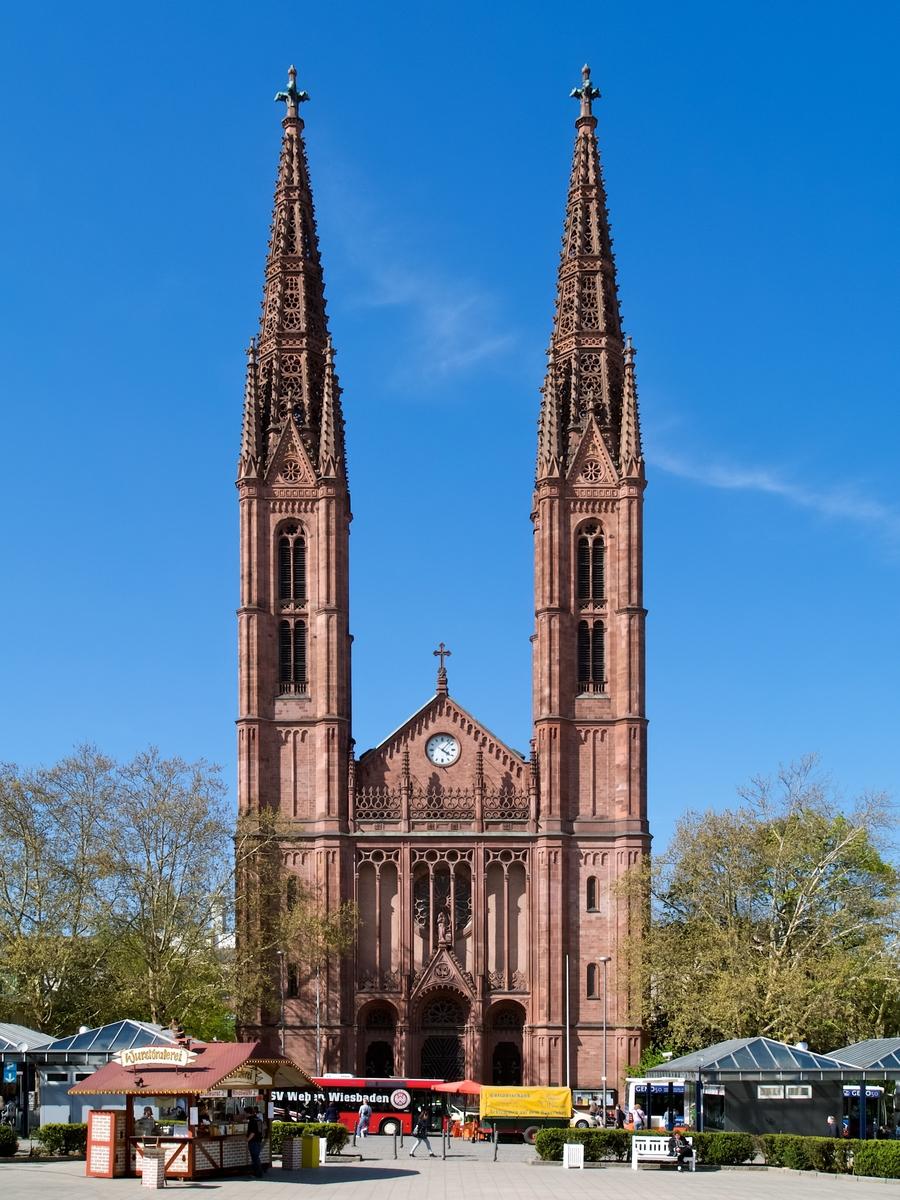
- St. Bonifatius
- 50°4′46″N 8°14′22″E
- Location: Wiesbaden, Hesse
- Country: Germany
- Denomination: Roman Catholic
- Website: bonifatius-wiesbaden.de

History
- Status: Parish church
- Dedication: St. Bonifatius
- Consecrated: 1849

Architecture
- Functional status: Active
- Architect: Philipp Hoffmann

Administration
- Province: Cologne
- Diocese: Limburg

St. Bonifatius in Wiesbaden, Germany, is the central Catholic parish and church in the capital of Hesse. The present building was designed by architect Philipp Hoffmann in Gothic Revival style and built from 1844 to 1849. Its twin steeples of 68 m (223 ft.) dominate the Luisenplatz. The parish is part of the Diocese of Limburg.

== History ==
=== The first church St. Bonifatius ===
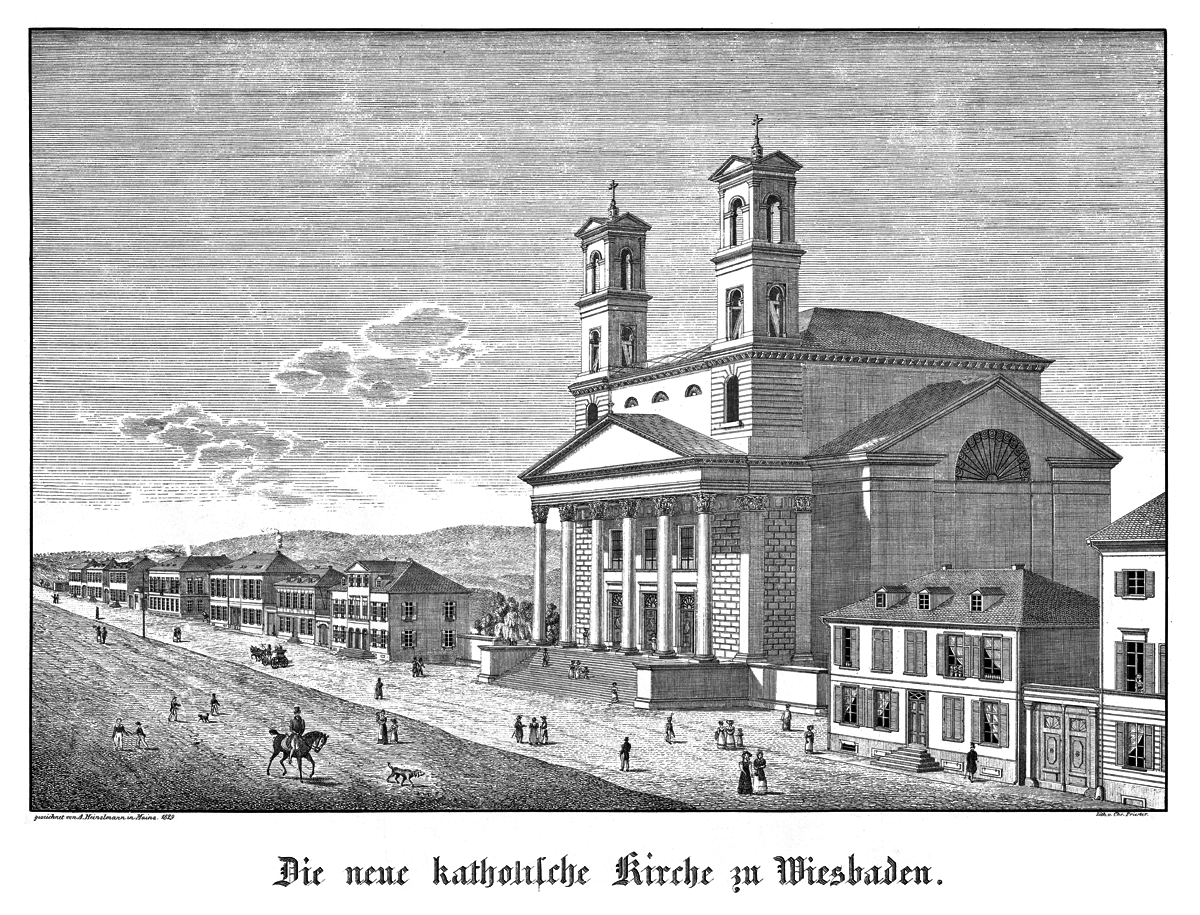
The first church St. Bonifatius, 1830, collapsed on 11 February 1831

As Wiesbaden was Protestant after the Reformation, the first Catholic parish after the Reformation was founded in 1800. The congregation first met in a Bethaus (oratory) in the Marktstraße. It soon became too small for the growing number of Catholics in the town, which prospered as a spa and Residenz of Nassau. The parish received grounds adjacent to the Luisenplatz from the Duke of Nassau, and from 1829 to 1831 Friedrich Ludwig Schrumpf built a rigidly Neoclassical church, in keeping with the buildings around the square. Soon after the building was completed, it collapsed on 11 February 1831. A likely reason is insufficient foundation on ground which had previously been ponds.

=== The second church St. Bonifatius ===
On 24 May 1843, the young Philipp Hoffmann received the commission to build a church. He had already participated in building the town castle. His design is reminiscent of Gothic architecture, but also includes elements of Romanesque architecture and naturalistic ornaments to be found later in the Jugendstil. The foundation was laid on the day of the patron saint St. Bonifatius, on 5 June 1845. The interior was consecrated by the Bishop of Limburg Peter Josef Blum on 19 June 1849. A rib vault is supported by 22 columns. The facade was completed in 1856, and the towers in 1866.

In World War II the church suffered severe damage. An air raid on 2 February 1945 destroyed all the windows, the roof, and part of the vault. Repairs made in 1949 replaced the vault with a simple construction. The vault was re-built in a general restoration in 1965, which also took into account the changes of the Second Vatican Council. A new altar by Elmar Hillebrand was added in 1967. The new windows are stained glass in mainly white, red and blue, designed by Johannes Beeck. Sculptor Karl Hoffmann created a crucifixion scene and a sculpture of both St. Francis and Teresa of Ávila.

== Church music ==
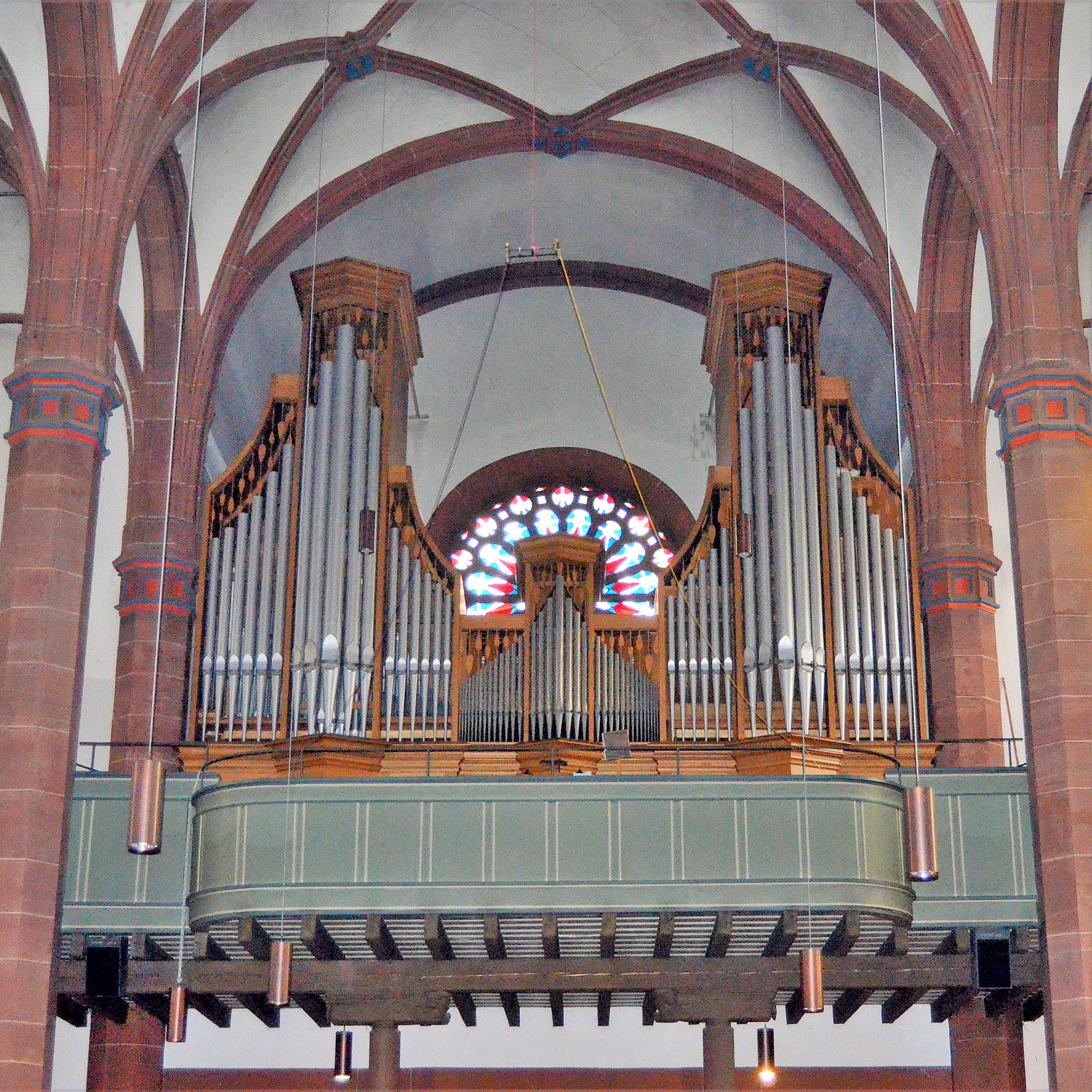
The organ, expanded by Hugo Mayer Orgelbau in 1985

An organ was built in 1954 by Orgelbau Romanus Seifert & Sohn. In 1985 the instrument was expanded by Hugo Mayer Orgelbau; in 1995 three electronic bass stops were added. The Kantor was Gabriel Dessauer from 1981, the conductor of the 120-member Chor von St. Bonifatius, founded in 1862, the children's choir Kinderchor von St. Bonifatius, and the Schola for Gregorian chant. He was succeeded by Roman Twardy. The church choir sings at services, including regular orchestral masses of Haydn, Mozart, Beethoven and Schubert for Christmas and Easter. Every year, typically on 3 October, a choral concert is performed. Other annual features are choral and organ concerts organised around a theme, called Boni-Musikwochen, including concerts of organists such as Kent Tritle and Ignace Michiels, and the project choir Reger-Chor. On 7 November 2015, as part of the 21st festival Wiesbadener Bachwochen, the church presented a concert dedicated to French church music, Gabriel Fauré's Cantique de Jean Racine and Requiem and Olivier Latry's Salve Regina. A project choir of 150 singers performed, led by three conductors of the Diocese of Limburg, with soloists and members of the orchestra of the Hessisches Staatstheater Wiesbaden.

Dessauer ended conducting the choir in 2019, succeeded by interim conductor Roman Twardy. His term as church musician ended with 2021. He was succeeded by Johannes Schröder.

== Priests ==
The priests of St. Bonifatius were at the same time Stadtdekan (dean) of Wiesbaden, including:

- Joseph Weyland (1863–1887)
- Antonius Hilfrich (1927–1930)
- Georg Rompel (1954–1968)
- Werner Bardenhewer (1974–1996)
- Ernst-Ewald Roth (1996–2006)
- Johannes zu Eltz (2006–2010)
- Wolfgang Rösch (2010–2013)
- Klaus Nebel (from 2015)

== Chaplains ==
- Lothar Zenetti (1926–2019)

== Literature ==
Gottfried Kiesow: Architekturführer Wiesbaden – Durch die Stadt des Historismus, 2006, ISBN 3-936942-71-4, pp. 75 (in German)

== Gallery ==
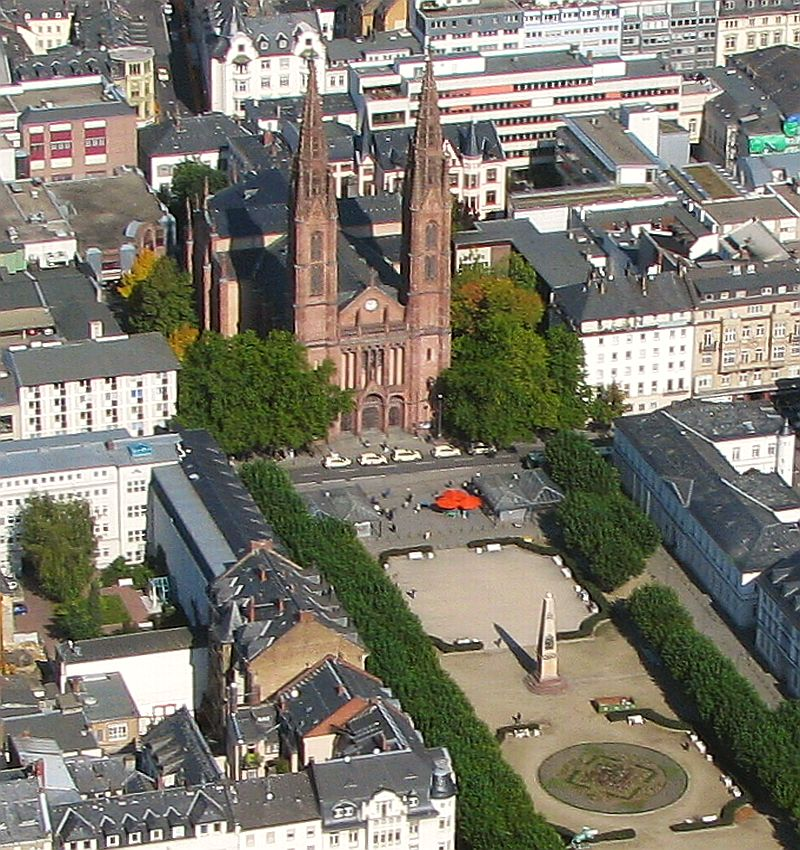
Aerial view of the Luisenplatz

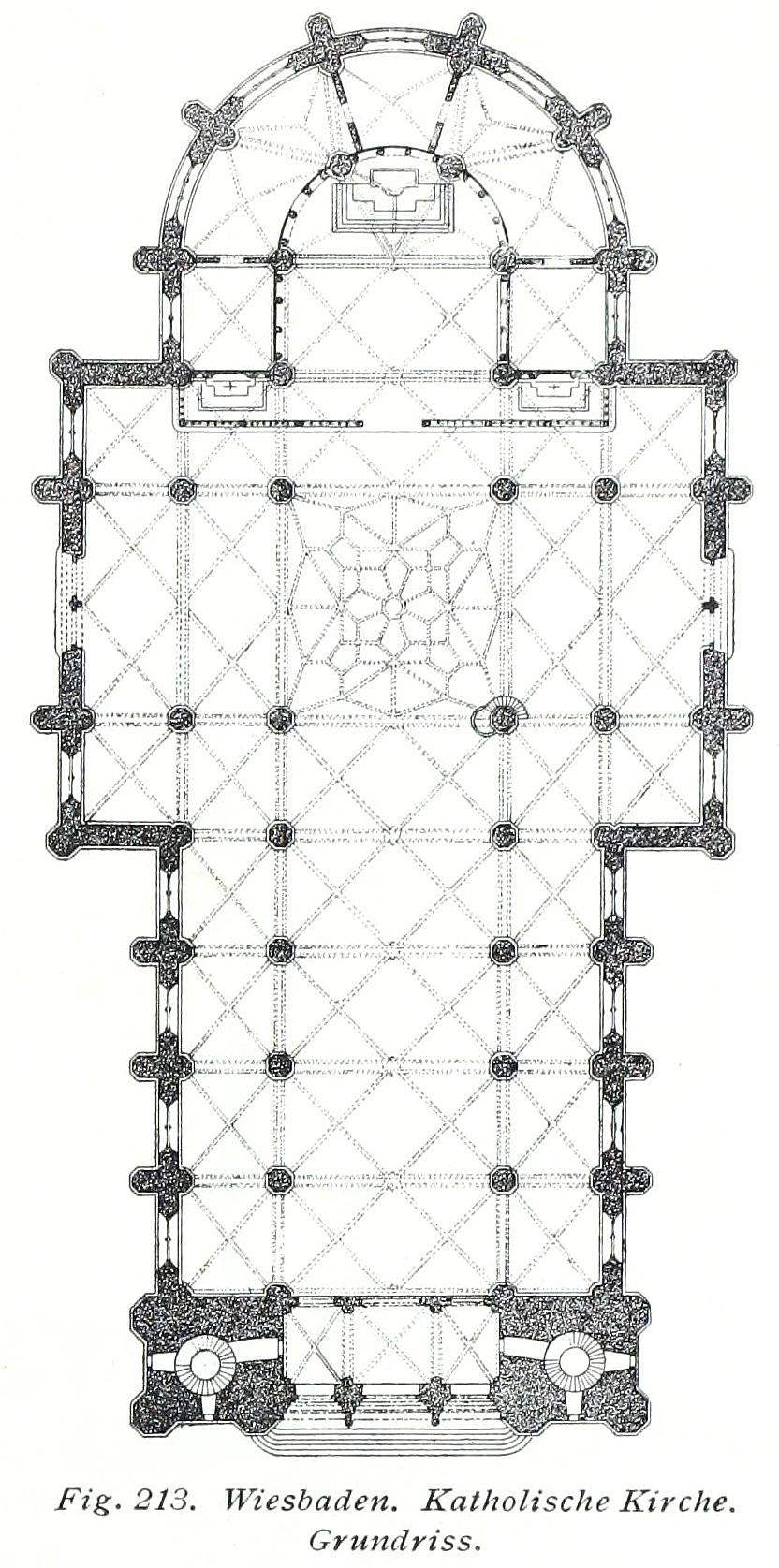
Ground plan

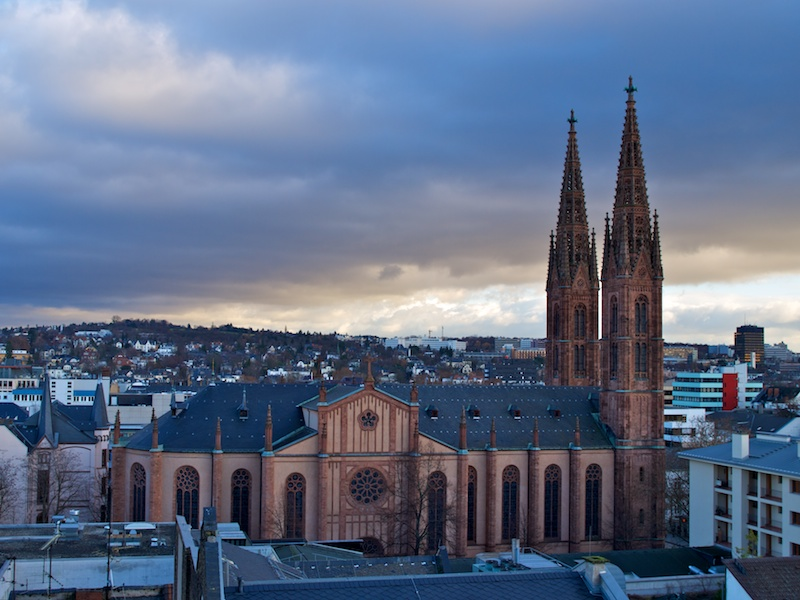
The church from the west

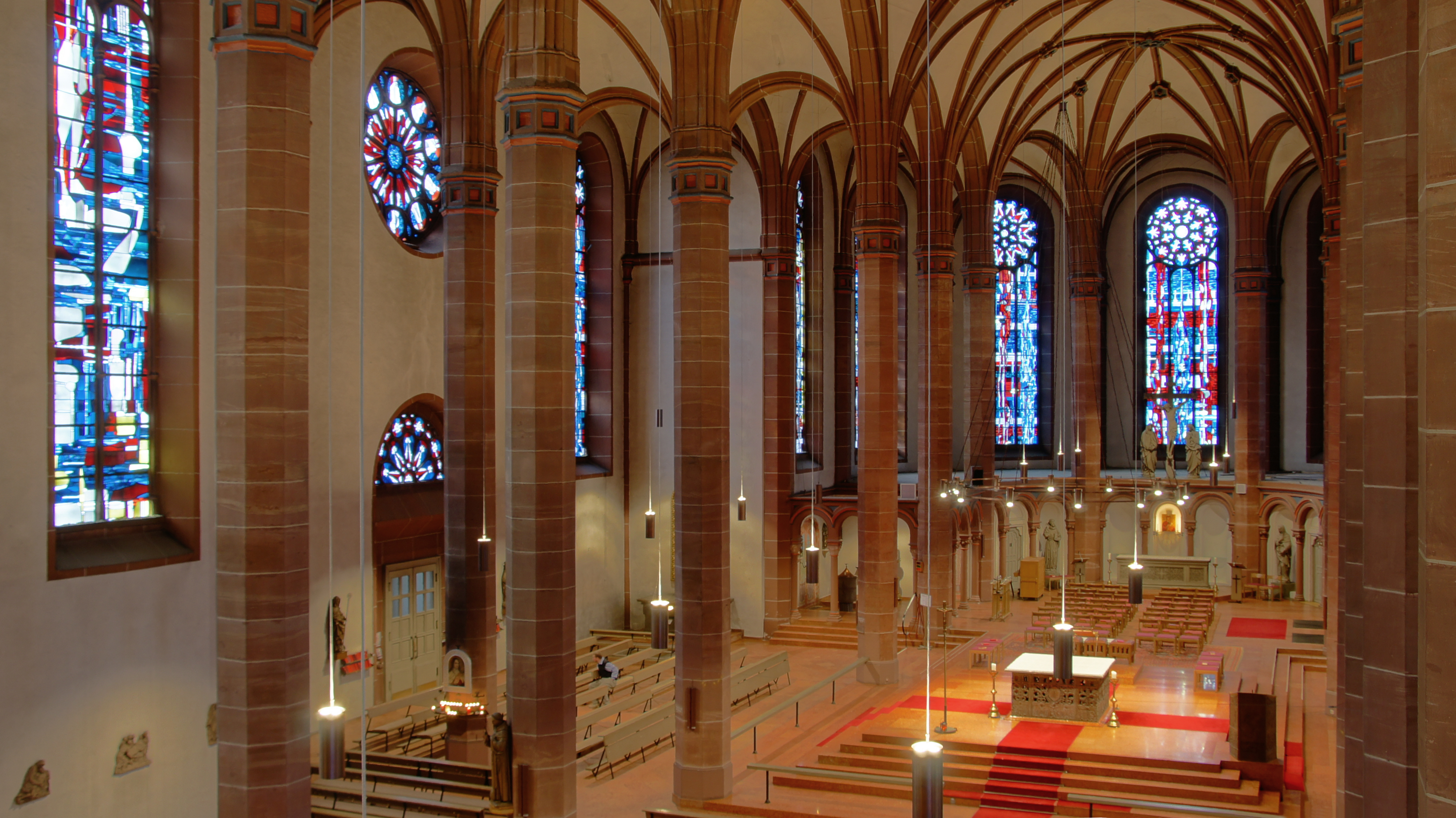
Interior from the organ loft
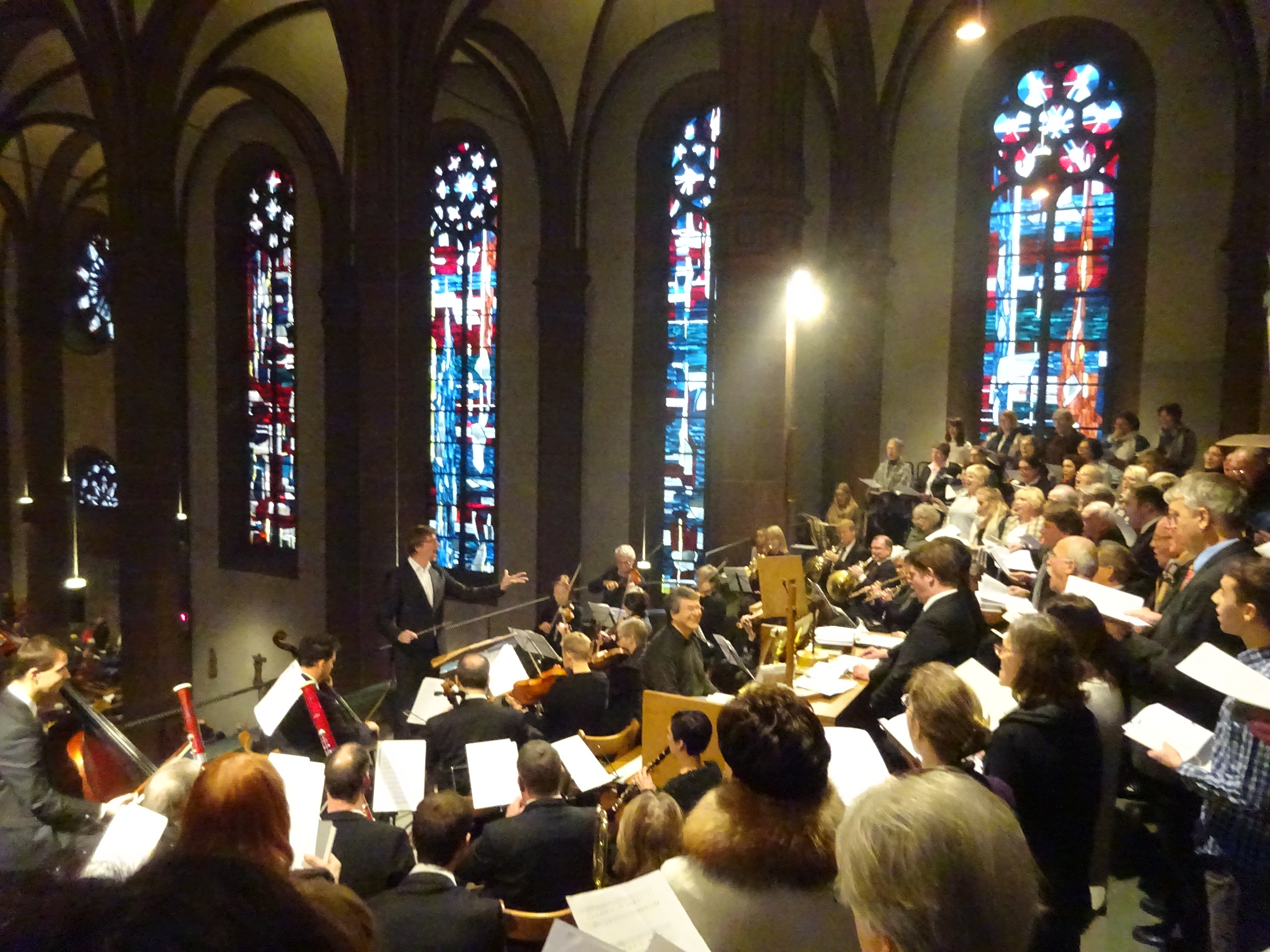
Christmas 2018

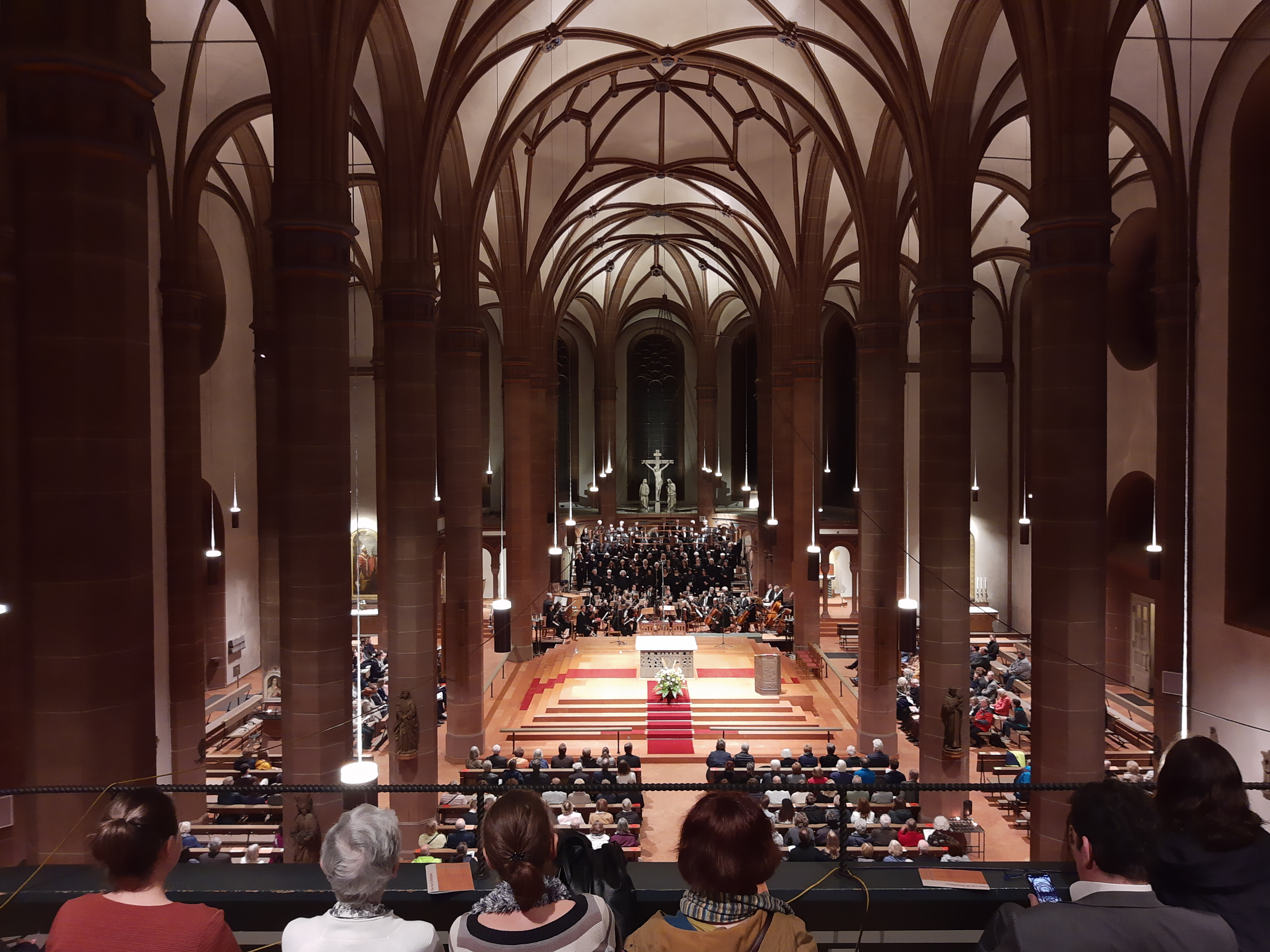
Dvořák's Stabat Mater, 2019

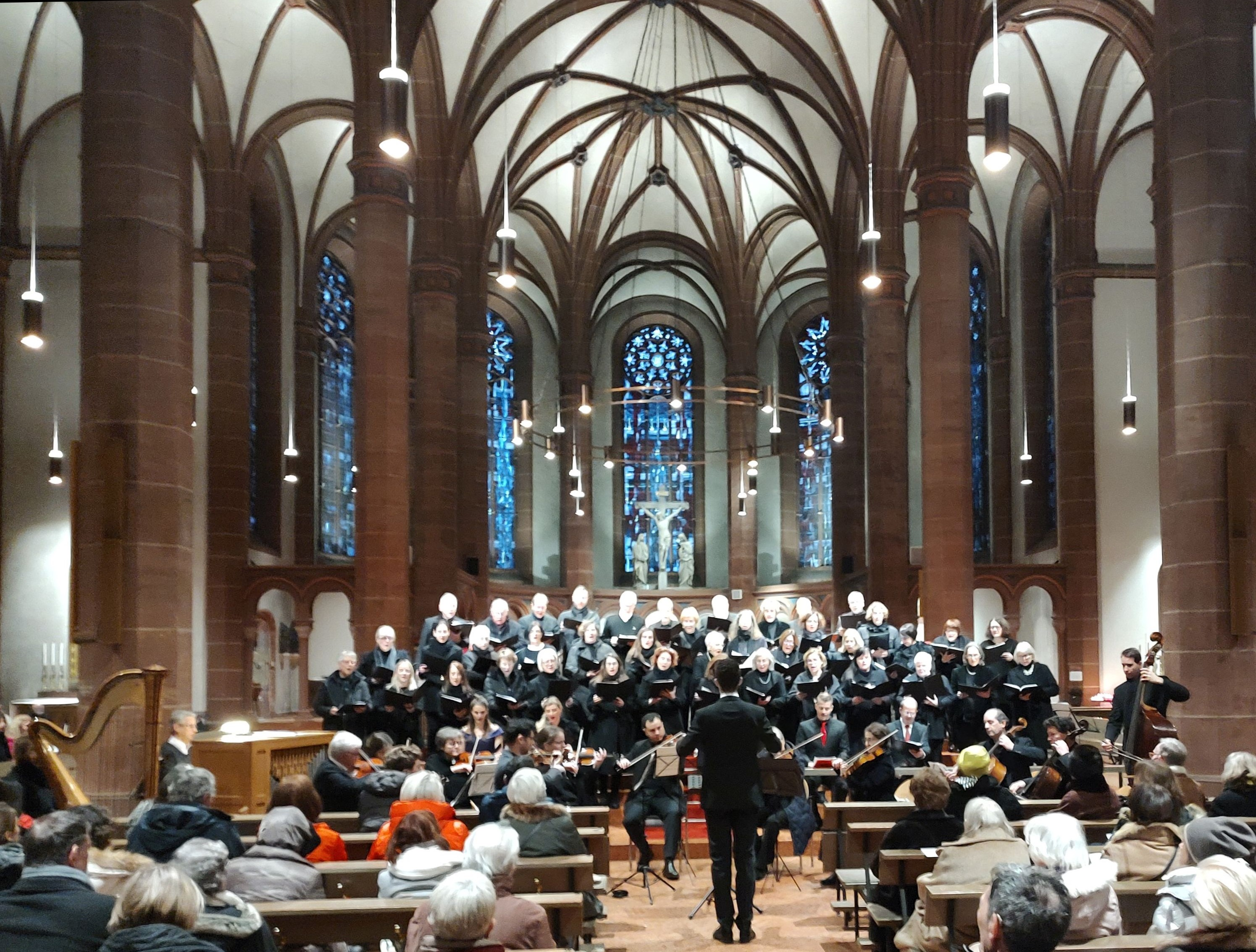
Oratorio de Noël, 2022
