= Hugo Mayer Orgelbau =

German organ building company

Hugo Mayer Orgelbau is a German organ builder in Heusweiler, Saarland, building pipe organs in the third generation. It was founded in 1952 by Hugo Mayer (1912–1980) in Brebach and moved to Heusweiler in 1957. His son Gerd Mayer took over in 1974. His son Stephan has been leader of new instruments (Neubauabteilung) from 1996.

== Works ==
Year	Location	Church	Image	Manuals	Stops	Notes
1954	Limbach	St. Willibrord		II/P	28 (31)	Restoration/expansion
1985	Wiesbaden	St. Bonifatius		III/P	55	
1989	Darmstadt	Liebfrauenkirche		28		
1994	Mülheim-Kärlich	St. Mauritius		II/P	29	
2000	Saarbrücken	St. Johann		V/P	60	Expansion
2014	Koblenz	St. Kastor		IV/P	44 (52)	
2015	Berlin-Spandau	Lutherkirche		II/P	26 (27)	
