= Altura (film) =

- Directed by: Mario Sequi
- Written by: Pietro Lissia; Vinicio Marinucci; Mario Sequi; Ákos Tolnay; Bruno Valeri
- Produced by: Saverio D'Amico; Ákos Tolnay
- Starring: Massimo Girotti; Roldano Lupi; Eleonora Rossi Drago
- Cinematography: Piero Portalupi
- Edited by: Marcella Gengarelli
- Music by: Ennio Porrino
- Production company: PFI
- Distributed by: Regionale Distribuzione
- Release date: 1949
- Running time: 88 minutes
- Country: Italy
- Language: Italian

Altura is a 1949 Italian crime melodrama film directed by Mario Sequi and starring Massimo Girotti, Roldano Lupi and Eleonora Rossi Drago. It is set in Sardinia and portrays a struggle between large landowners and a co-operative of shepherds.

== Cast ==
- Massimo Girotti as Stanis Archena
- Roldano Lupi as Efisio Barra
- Eleonora Rossi Drago as Grazia
- Anna Maria Bottini as Zia Alena
- Fausto Guerzoni as Napoleone
- Vittorio Duse
- Mirko Ellis
- Gianni De Montero
- Paolo Scampuddu
- Nanni Peru

== Plot ==
In Sardinia, Stanis, who had left the village years ago, returns and finds it in the hands of Barra, an evil man who dominates the milk market unchallenged. Joined in a cooperative with other shepherds, one day, Barra's henchmen attacked the truck bringing milk to markets in other countries. Forced to flee the country, his fiancée is courted more and more persistently by Barra. Still, Stanis returns and, thanks to a former employee, obtains evidence that Barra had the truck destroyed. After a long chase, Barra is killed.

== Production ==
The film can be ascribed to the strand of sentimental melodramas, commonly called tearjerkers, then very much in vogue among Italian audiences, later renamed by critics as appendix neorealism.

It was registered with the Public Film Registry under No. 846. Submitted to the Cinematographic Review Board on April 6, 1950, it obtained censorship visa No. 7,714 on April 18, 1950, with a film length of 2,185 meters.

== Bibliography ==
- Maria Bonaria Urban. Sardinia on Screen: The Construction of the Sardinian Character in Italian Cinema. Rodopi, 2013.
