= Narciso Figueroa =

Puerto Rican musician

- "Father of the Modern Danzas"

Background information
- Born: October 31, 1906; Aguadilla, Puerto Rico
- Died: September 4, 2004 (aged 97) Rio Piedras, Puerto Rico
- Genres: Danza
- Occupation: Musician
- Instrument: piano

Narciso Figueroa (October 31, 1906 – September 4, 2004) is considered to be the "Father of the Modern Danzas".

== Early years ==
Figueroa was the second of eight siblings born to Jesus Figueroa and Carmen Sanabria in Aguadilla, Puerto Rico. Both his parents performed in concerts and were also music instructors. Raised in a musically inclined family, it was to no surprise that eventually Figueroa and his brothers and sisters were to become the foundation of one of Puerto Rico's greatest musical dynasties. They received their first music lessons from their parents. By the time Figueroa was 10 years old, he played the piano and his brother José played the violin in front of live audiences, performing the sonatas of Mozart and Beethoven.

Figueroa and his siblings went to Spain to study music in the Royal Conservatory of Music of Madrid. He studied music and harmony and when he graduated he won two awards, "Primer Premio en Piano"(First Prize in Piano) and "Música de Cámara"(Chamber Music). The director of the Conservatory invited Figueroa and his brother Jaime (Kachiro) on a musical tour throughout Spain, Portugal and Africa. Needless to say, the brothers took advantage of this opportunity. Figueroa went to Paris after the tour and enrolled in the "Ecole Normale de Musique" (Normal School of Music) under the tutorship of Alfred Cortat.

== Musical career ==
Figueroa returned to Puerto Rico in 1940 after entertaining audiences all over Europe. In the island he formed the Brothers Figueroa Quintet. Narciso played the piano, Jose played first violin, Jaime played second violin, Guillermo the viola and Rafael the cello. His sisters, Leonor, Carmelina and Angelina would sometimes participate. During this time, Figueroa was also named professor and director of the piano department of the Conservatory of Music of Puerto Rico, a position which he held for many years.

In 1959, he published "Canciones de Puerto Rico" (Songs of Puerto Rico), which contained some his compositions based on the folklore of Puerto Rico. Figueroa is credited with modernizing the Puerto Rican danzas and is therefore known as the "Father of the Modern Danzas".

== Danzas ==
External audio
- You may listen to Narciso Figueroa play Olimpio Otero Vergés "La Cuñadita" on YouTube
- and to Luciano Quiñones piano interpretation of Figueroa's "Trigueña" here

He composed the following danzas:

- Añoranzas - (What I Miss)
- Danza negra para piano y voz - (Black danza for piano and voice)
- Me voy pa' Niu Yol - (I'm going to Nue YorK)
- Recuerdos - (Memories)
- Illusion

He also composed the following Christmas themes:

- Aguinaldo Jíbaro
- Camino de Belen
- El Arbol de Navidad
- El pobre zapatero
- Nochebuena
- Soy un pobre Jíbaro

== Later years ==
On April 27, 1997, Figueroa was inducted into the Puerto Rican Danza Composers Hall of Fame, located in the town of San German, Puerto Rico. The Puerto Rican Institute of Culture dedicated the 1997 week of the danza to Figueroa. Narciso Figueroa died in his home in Rio Piedras, Puerto Rico on September 4, 2004, at the age of 98.

== Legacy ==
The offspring of the Fiqueroa family have continued the family musical tradition. Guillermo Figueroa Jr., Narciso Figueroa Jr. and Rafael Figueroa Jr. belong to the Metropolitan Opera Orchestra and they are the first chairs of the Metropolitan Opera House. Guillermo Jr., who is also the conductor of the Puerto Rico Symphony, is the leader of the "Figueroa Quartet", which is considered the official chamber quartet of Puerto Rico. The quartet includes Guillermo Jr. and Narciso Jr. on the violins, Rafael Jr. on the cello and as pianist Ivonne Figueroa. The novelist Mayra Montero wrote a novel titled "Vana Ilusión" based on the life and times of Narciso Figueroa.

== See also ==
- List of Puerto Ricans
