= Festival dei Due Mondi =

Italian festival

Coordinates: 42.73578°N 12.73527°E

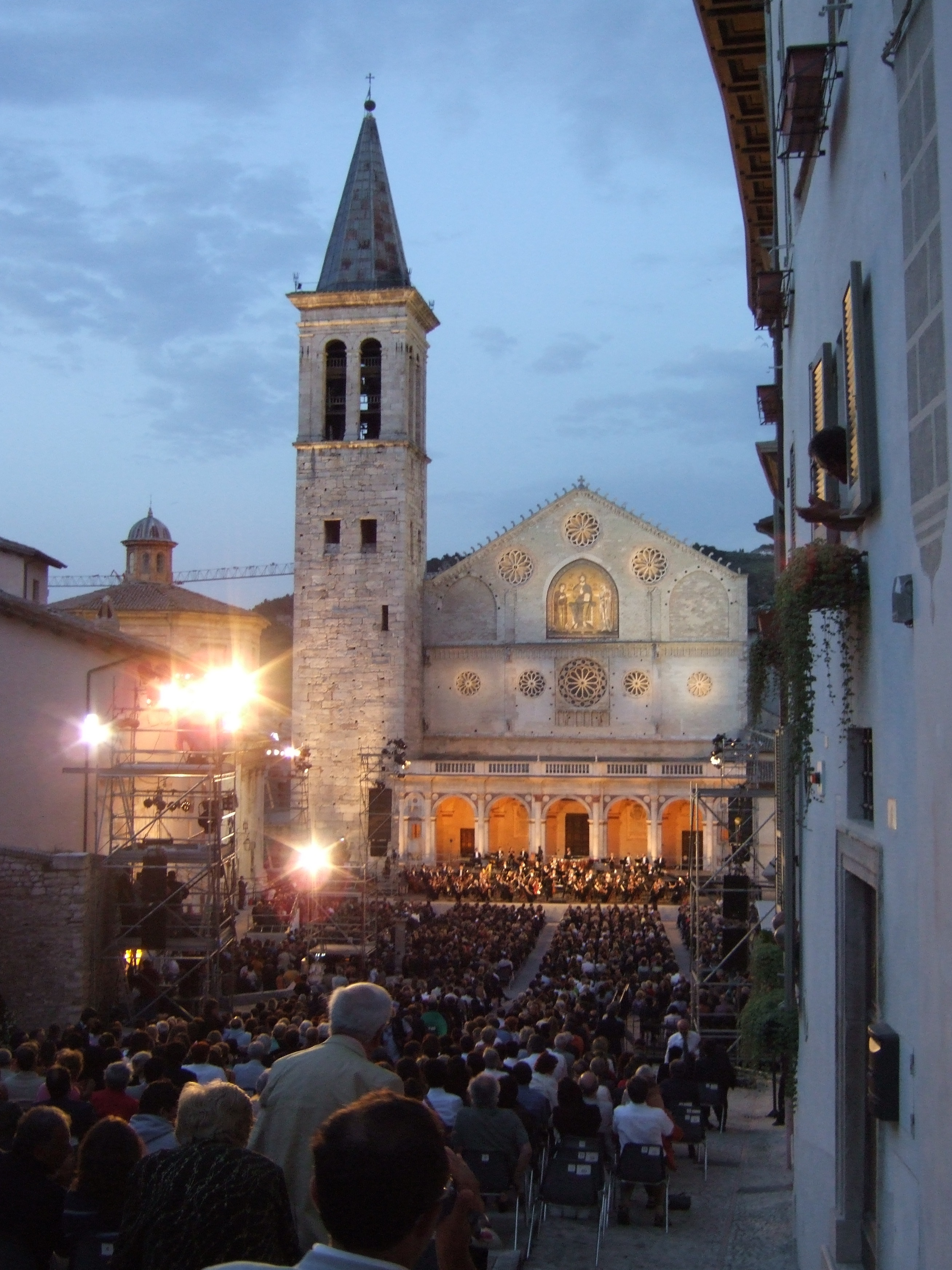
London Symphony Orchestra at Spoleto Festival 2008 (italy).

The Festival dei Due Mondi (Festival of the Two Worlds) is an annual summer music and opera festival held each June to early July in Spoleto, Italy, since its founding by composer Gian Carlo Menotti in 1958. It features a vast array of concerts, opera, dance, drama, visual arts and roundtable discussions on science.

The "Two Worlds" in the name of the festival comes from Gian Carlo Menotti's intention to have the worlds of American and European culture facing each other in his event; this concept would then be strengthened by the fact that it was held in conjunction with its "twin", the Spoleto Festival USA held annually in May/June in Charleston, South Carolina. That twinning lasted some 15 years and, after growing disputes between the Menotti family and the board of Spoleto Festival USA, in the early 1990s a separation occurred. Under Menotti's direction in 1986, a third installment in the Spoleto Festival series was held in Melbourne, Australia. Melbourne's Spoleto Festival changed its name to the Melbourne International Festival of the Arts in 1990.

Following Menotti's death in 2007, changes occurred in the administration with the result that the Italian Minister of Cultural Affairs appointed a new Artistic Administrator who continues to run the Festival.

== Changes in administration ==
Following Menotti's death in February 2007, the city administrations of Spoleto and Charleston started talks to re-unite the two festivals, which resulted in the Mayor of Spoleto, Massimo Brunini, attending the opening ceremony of Spoleto Festival USA in May 2008.

However, at the time of the 2007 Festival, the President and Artistic Director was Menotti's adopted son, Francis "Chip" Menotti and, in the fall of 2007, the Italian Minister of Cultural Affairs, Francesco Rutelli—after unsuccessful negotiations with Menotti—removed him from his position and named Giorgio Ferrara new artistic director of the festival. This has resulted in continuing controversy between representatives of the "old" and "new" managements of the Festival, as exemplified by the maintenance of a website critical of the former management, which can be seen below.

== Prominent artists who have been involved ==
- Luchino Visconti
- Eduardo De Filippo
- Mohammad B. Ghaffari
- Rudolf Nureyev
- Carla Fracci
- Charles Wadsworth
- Thomas Schippers
- Barbara Blegen
- Romolo Valli
- Ken Russell
- Nino Rota
- Roman Polanski
- Ezra Pound
- Vittorio Gassman
- Arnoldo Foà
- Luciano Pavarotti
- Joaquin Cortes
- Ralph Farris
- Al Pacino
- Marisa Berenson
- Allen Ginsberg
- Henry Moore
- David Smith (sculptor)
- Alexander Calder
- Renée Fleming

== See also ==
- List of opera festivals
- Francis Menotti
