= Nathaniel Merrill =

American stage director and opera director

Nathaniel Merrill

Nathaniel Merrill (February 8, 1927 – September 9, 2008) was an American stage director and opera director. He was the resident stage director at the Metropolitan Opera from 1956-1985. During his 28 seasons at the Met he staged a total of 14 new productions in addition to directing several revivals. He also served as the Artistic Director of Central City Opera from 1959-1966. In 1981 he and his wife, conductor Louise Sherman, founded Opera Colorado. Merrill served as the company's artistic director and stage director and his wife worked as the company's musical director. Upon his wife's death from cancer in 1998, Merrill retired and thereafter lived in Denver until his death of complications related to Alzheimer's disease a decade later.

== Career ==
Born in Newton, Massachusetts, Merrill earned degrees from Dartmouth College, the New England Conservatory of Music, and Boston University. After working with the Hamburg State Opera, the Hessisches Staatstheater Wiesbaden, the Glyndebourne Festival, and the Salzburg Festival, he joined the staff at the Metropolitan Opera in 1956 where his first job was to create a revised staging of Joseph L. Mankiewicz's 1952 production of Giacomo Puccini's La bohème. His first major critical successes at the Met came during the 1960–1961 season when he directed the new staging of L'elisir d'amore and staged a brand new production of Puccini's Turandot that was designed by Cecil Beaton. He went on to stage several Met premieres including, Strauss's Die Frau ohne Schatten (1966), Berlioz's Les Troyens (1973) and Gershwin's Porgy and Bess (1985).

Many of Merrill's stagings remained a part of the company's repertory for decades, including his stagings of Donizetti's L'elisir d'amore (1960), Wagner's Die Meistersinger von Nürnberg (1962) and Humperdinck's Hänsel und Gretel (1967). Other operas he staged for the company included Adriana Lecouvreur (1963), Aida (1963), Samson et Dalila (1964), Luisa Miller (1968), Il trovatore (1969) and Parsifal (1970) among others. His 1969 staging of Der Rosenkavalier was used through 2012. Opera News said, "Merrill productions were designed to survive multiple revivals and cast changes; generally traditional and always clear, their simple but effective staging touches, such as Dulcamara's arrival via hot-air balloon in Elisir, kept Met audiences diverted and amused for a generation.

During his years at the Met, Merrill also worked for several other opera companies, notably working as the Artistic Director of Central City Opera in Colorado for seven years. From 1974 to 1978 he worked as the resident producer and director of technical services for the Opéra national du Rhin. He also directed operas for many companies both in the United States and abroad during his career, including the Arena di Verona Festival, the Badisches Staatstheater Karlsruhe, the Bregenz Festival, the Hamburg State Opera, the Houston Grand Opera, the Lyric Opera of Chicago, the Miami Opera, the Opera Company of Philadelphia, the Salzburg Festival, the San Diego Opera, the Teatro Colón, and the Vienna State Opera among others.
