= I Shardana =

I Shardana is a 1949 opera by Sardinian composer Ennio Porrino, which was premiered in 1959 at the Teatro San Carlo, Naples under Gastone Limarilli and Piero Guelfi. The libretto by the composer was inspired by Bronze Age stone towers, megalithic nuraghes, found across Sardinia.

== Recording ==
1960: Armando La Rosa Parodi, Orchestra e Coro di Roma della RAI, Decca.

Torbeno: Gastone Limarilli
Bèrbera Jonia: Marta Pender
Gonnario: Ferruccio Mazzoli

Nibatta: Oralia Dominguez
Norace: Piero Guelfi
Orzocco: Vinicio Cocchieri

- DVD Button Marrocu, Palomba, Ledda; Signorini, Villari, Ruggeri, Balzani, Mangione; Orchestra and Chorus of Fondazione Teatro Lirico di Cagliari, Bramall. Production: Livermore. Dynamic 37683, 114 mins., subtitled
