= Ennio Porrino =

Italian composer (1910–1959)

- Ennio Porrino in the late 1950s
- Born: 20 January 1910; Cagliari, Sardinia ITL
- Died: 25 September 1959 (aged 49); Rome ITL
- Works: Altura

Ennio Porrino (20 January 1910 – 25 September 1959) was an Italian composer and teacher. Amongst his compositions were orchestral works, an oratorio and several operas and ballets. His best known work is the symphonic poem Sardegna, a tribute to his native Sardinia, which premiered in Florence in 1933.

== Life and career ==
Ennio Porrino (photo with 1959 dedication)

Porrino was born in Cagliari and studied at the Accademia Nazionale di Santa Cecilia in Rome. He later studied with Ottorino Respighi from 1932 to 1935. According to Alfredo Casella, he became one of Respighi's disciples, championing an Italian national music movement and openly opposing composers such as Casella, Dallapiccola, and Malipiero for their Modernist music. After Respighi's death in 1936, Porrino and Respighi's widow Elsa completed his unfinished opera Lucrezia for its posthumous premiere at La Scala in 1937.

In the course of his career, Porrino taught at the conservatories of Rome, Venice, and Naples, and in 1956 became the director of the Cagliari Conservatory. That same year he married Malgari Onnis (born 1935), a painter and theatrical designer. She designed the production of Porrino's last work, the opera I Shardana, which premiered on 21 March 1959, six months before his death. The couple had one daughter, Stefania (born 1957), who became a playwright and stage director.

Porrino died in Rome in 1959 at the age of 49. The Concorso Internazionale di Pianoforte Ennio Porrino was established in his memory in 1980.

== Selected filmography ==
- The Howl (1948)
- Altura (1949)
