= Johannes zu Eltz =

German priest (born 1957)

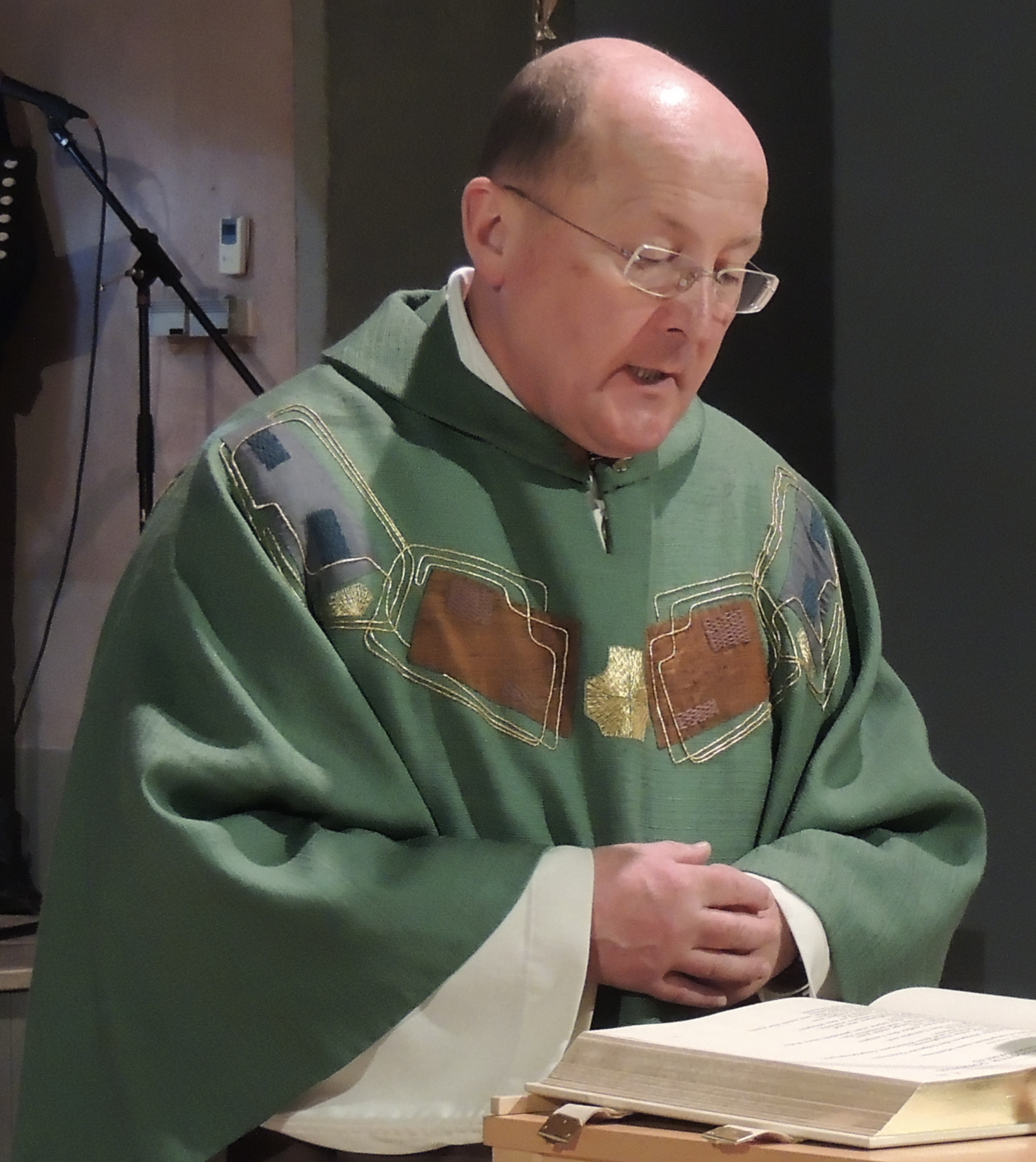
- Eltz in 2017
- Born: 2 October 1957 (age 68); Eltville am Rhein, Hesse, Germany
- Education: LMU Munich; Johannes Gutenberg University Mainz; Sankt Georgen Graduate School of Philosophy and Theology; Pontifical Gregorian University; Anselmianum; Pontifical Gregorian University
- Occupation: Catholic priest
- Organizations: St. Bonifatius, Wiesbaden; Frankfurt Cathedral; Limburg Cathedral chapter

Johannes zu Eltz (born 2 October 1957) is a German Catholic priest, who has served as Dean of Frankfurt, and a member of the cathedral chapter of the Diocese of Limburg. Trained as a jurist, he became a priest in important parishes in Hesse, Germany. In Frankfurt, he has pursued ecumenism and collaboration with other Christian churches and the Jewish community. He is a member of the Synodal Path, seeking reforms in the Catholic Church.

== Life and career ==
Born in Eltville am Rhein, Eltz is a descendant member of the Eltz noble family. The son of Jakob zu Eltz and his wife Ladislaja née Mayr von Melnhof, he grew up with eight siblings on a winery in the Rheingau. He studied law at LMU Munich and at the Johannes Gutenberg University Mainz. After earning his doctorate in Mainz, he decided to become a priest. He studied philosophy and Catholic theology at the Sankt Georgen Graduate School of Philosophy and Theology in Frankfurt and at the Anselmianum in Rome. From 1993 to 1995, he studied canon law at the Pontifical Gregorian University in Rome, and was licensed for church law (Kirchenrecht) in 1995.

He was consecrated as a priest at the Limburg Cathedral on 29 June 1991. He then served as chaplain in Oberursel, and from 1995 to 2001 as parish priest in Kölbingen and Rothenbach in the Westerwald. From 1999 to 2010, he was also a judge at Limburg Church Court of the Diocese, and was its Offizial, especially concerned with marital cases. From 2001, he was also a member of the cathedral chapter.

From 2006 to 2010, Eltz was dean of St. Bonifatius in Wiesbaden. In August 2010, he became dean in Frankfurt, serving the parishes of the Frankfurt Cathedral, St. Bernhard and Allerheiligenkirche, also responsible for the Caritas Frankfurt. He is a member in the ecumenical Rat der Religionen (Council of religions) in Frankfurt, and in the Römerbergbündnis, an initiative against far-right politics of the Deutscher Gewerkschaftsbund, Christian churches, the Jewish community in Frankfurt and the Jugendring youth organisation.

Eltz was an early critic of his bishop Franz-Peter Tebartz-van Elst, and was instrumental in his dismission.

In January 2018, Eltz spoke up for the blessing of same-sex unions also in the Catholic Church, as done before only by Bishop Franz-Josef Bode of the Diocese Osnabrück. In 2019, he signed the open letter to Cardinal Reinhard Marx, demanding a new approach to sexual ethics in the Catholic Church, especially regarding understanding of same-sex relationships ("Neustart mit der Sexualmoral", "verständige und gerechte Bewertung von Homosexualität"), first published in the Frankfurter Allgemeine Zeitung on 3 February 2019.

Eltz is a member of the Synodal Path, a series of conferences related to critical questions within the Catholic Church, such as the position of women, sexuality, and the position of priests. 230 delegates met for the first conference in 2020.

== Publications ==
- Lehrstuhlbesetzung und Beanstandung am Fachbereich Katholische Theologie der Universität Mainz, in: Sonderband: Neues Jahrbuch für das Bistum Mainz, Diocese of Mainz. Verlag Schmidt, Mainz 1988, ISBN 3-87439-183-3.
