= Musica Sacra (New York City) =

American choir

Musica Sacra is the longest continuously performing professional chorus in New York City. Its founder, Richard Westenburg, directed the chorus from 1964 until 2007, when he was succeeded as director by Kent Tritle. The chorus regularly performs in Carnegie Hall and other New York concert halls.

Musica Sacra is not associated with the chorus of the same name in Cambridge, Massachusetts.
