= Raymond Gniewek =

American musician (1931–2021)

- Born: November 13, 1931; East Meadow, New York, U.S.
- Died: October 1, 2021 (aged 89)
- Education: Eastman School of Music
- Occupation: musician
- Notable work: concertmaster, Metropolitan Opera
- Spouse(s): Doris Scott, Lolita San Miguel, Judith Blegen
- Relatives: Cecilia Brauer (sister)

Raymond Gniewek (November 13, 1931 – October 1, 2021) was an American violinist.

== Biography ==
Gniewek was born in East Meadow, New York, to Jacenta Gniewek and to Leocadia Gniewek (née Kurowska). His sister Cecilia was a pianist. Gniewek began began his musical education in New York City. He continued musical studies at the Eastman School of Music, studying with Andre de Ribaupierre and Joseph Knitzer, becoming concertmaster of the Eastman-Rochester Orchestra and associate concertmaster of Rochester Philharmonic Orchestra under Erich Leinsdorf. Other teachers were the Canadian violinist Albert Pratz and Raphael Bronstein of New York City.

Gniewek served as concertmaster of the Metropolitan Opera orchestra for 43 years, the second American-born music to hold the post. Upon his appointment in 1957 at age 26, he was the youngest person to ever hold the post. He also enjoyed a career as a soloist. His final performance as concertmaster with the orchestra was a concert performance in Carnegie Hall of Béla Bartók's Bluebeard's Castle in 2000.

Following his retirement from the Metropolitan Opera, Gniewek relocated to Naples, Florida, where he played violin with Opera Naples. Gniewek died in Naples, Florida on 1 October 2021.

Gniewek was married three times. His first marriage was to Doris Scott. The couple had two daughters, Susan Law and Davi Loren. Their marriage ended in divorce. His second marriage was to the ballet dancer and Pilates instructor Lolita San Miguel. This marriage ended in divorce. His third marriage was to soprano Judith Blegen. Blegen, his daughter Susan, his stepson, seven grandchildren; and two great-grandchildren survived him. His daughter Davi Loren predeceased him, in May 2021. His sister Cecilia Brauer, who played celesta and glass harmonica in the Metropolitan Opera Orchestra, died on 16 October 2021.

== Videography ==
- Mozart: Idomeneo (1982), Deutsche Grammophon DVD, 00440-073-4234, 2006
- The Metropolitan Opera Centennial Gala (1983), Deutsche Grammophon DVD, 00440-073-4538, 2009
- The Metropolitan Opera Gala 1991, Deutsche Grammophon DVD, 00440-073-4582, 2010
- James Levine's 25th Anniversary Metropolitan Opera Gala (1996), Deutsche Grammophon DVD, B0004602-09, 2005
