= Kent Tritle =

American conductor and organist (born 1960)

- Born: August 26, 1960 (age 66)
- Occupations: Conductor, organist
- Instrument: Organ
- Formerly of: New York Philharmonic

Kent Tritle (born August 26, 1960) is a choral conductor and organist in New York City, United States. He is the current director of the professional chorus Musica Sacra and of the Oratorio Society of New York, and director of cathedral music and organist at the Cathedral of St. John the Divine. He is a concert organist, including organist of the New York Philharmonic and the American Symphony Orchestra. He has been Director of Choral Activities at the Manhattan School of Music, and on the graduate faculty of the Juilliard School.

== Career ==
From 1989 until 2011 Tritle was organist and choral director of the Church of St. Ignatius Loyola, New York. He directed there a concert series Sacred Music in a Sacred Space. He was artistic consultant on the design and installation in 1993 of the church's renowned four-manual, 68-stop mechanical action organ built by Mander Organs Ltd. of London, England.

Tritle has been organist of the New York Philharmonic and the American Symphony Orchestra. With the Philharmonic he has recorded Brahms's Ein Deutsches Requiem, Britten's War Requiem and Henze's Symphony No. 9, conducted by Kurt Masur, as well as the Grammy-nominated Sweeney Todd conducted by Andrew Litton. He has performed with most all the conductors on the philharmonic's roster. He is featured on the Cala label's New York Legends series with principal players of the New York Philharmonic, and on the AMDG, Epiphany, Gothic, VAI and Telarc labels. He has produced Glorious Pipes, a compendium of great organ music, for Universal Classics. He is also a regular guest artist with the Chamber Music Society of Lincoln Center. He has performed as recitalist in Asia and Europe. Recitals include those at the Gewandhaus Leipzig, the Zurich Tonhalle and at St. Sulpice, Paris. Tritle's artistic collaborations include those with Susanne Mentzer, Susan Graham, Renée Fleming (for BBC Wales), Jessye Norman, Sherrill Milnes, Marilyn Horne, Tony Randall and Hei-Kyung Hong, Barbara Dever, André Previn and Yo-Yo Ma. In 2010 he played in St. Bonifatius, Wiesbaden.

Tritle was from 1996-2004 music director of the Emmy-nominated Dessoff Choirs, winners of the ASCAP Chorus America award for adventurous programming of contemporary music. Under his direction Dessoff sang with the Cleveland Orchestra, the New York Philharmonic, San Francisco Symphony, American Symphony Orchestra, and the Czech Philharmonic. They have appeared regularly in Lincoln Center’s Mostly Mozart Festival, including the nationally telecast and Emmy-nominated Live from Lincoln Center performance of Mozart's Requiem in 2001.

In January 2006 Tritle was appointed music director of the Oratorio Society of New York. His Carnegie Hall debut conducting Handel's Messiah with that organization garnered critical acclaim from The New York Times.

Tritle holds graduate and undergraduate degrees from The Juilliard School in organ performance and choral conducting and has been on the Juilliard faculty since 1996, currently directing a graduate practicum on oratorio in collaboration with the school's Vocal Arts Department. He has been a featured personality on ABC World News Tonight, National Public Radio, and Minnesota Public Radio, as well as in The New York Times and numerous other radio and print outlets.

In the fall of 2008 Tritle began his tenure as Director of Choral Activities at Manhattan School of Music--a tenure that ended in 2022.

Since 2011 he has been director of cathedral music and organist for the Cathedral Church of Saint John the Divine.

== Sources ==
- Kent Tritle Appointed Director of Cathedral Music and Organist stjohndivine.org
- Kent Tritle on the New York Philharmonic website
- Kent Tritle on the Oratorio Society of New York
- Kent Tritle on WQXR
- Kent Tritle (Choral Conductor, Organ) on bach-cantatas
