= Musica Sacra (Cambridge) =

Musica Sacra is a mixed choral ensemble based in Cambridge, Massachusetts. It was founded in 1959, and has been under the direction of Mary Beekman since 1979. Despite its name, the chorus performs both sacred and secular music, spanning five centuries. Its performances, typically in First Church Congregational in Cambridge, are frequently reviewed by the local media. The group has also performed at the invitation of institutions such as the Boston Early Music Festival; WGBH Radio; The Museum of Fine Arts, Boston; and the Fogg Art Museum of Harvard University.

Musica Sacra is not associated with the chorus in New York of the same name.

== Discography ==
- Love, Lust, and Laudations: Flemish Choral Music of the High Renaissance, 2003.
- Welcome Yule!, 2006.
- Piteous Beauty, 2012.
- Baltic Inspirations, 2014.
- The Song of Songs, 2016.
