= Missoula Symphony Orchestra =

Orchestra in Missoula, Montana

- Orchestra
- Founded: 1954
- Location: Missoula, Montana, U.S.
- Concert hall: Dennison Theatre
- Principal conductor: Julia Tai
- Website: missoulasymphony.org

The Missoula Symphony Orchestra is an American orchestra and 501c3 non-profit organization based in Missoula, Montana. It is affiliated with the Missoula Symphony Chorale with which they make up the Missoula Symphony Association. The association holds five two-performance concerts a year at the University of Montana Dennison Theatre in addition to an outdoor summer concerts Downtown Missoula, two Youth Concerts, and a Family Concert.

The Missoula Symphony Association was organized in 1954 by Eugene Andrie and comprised faculty and staff from the University of Montana. It performed its first concert on April 3, 1955, and was accepted into the American Symphony Orchestra League a year later. The Missoula Symphony Chorale was organized in 1962 and finally the Missoula Symphony Association was formed in 1976.
