= Chor von St. Bonifatius =

German mixed choir

- Choir
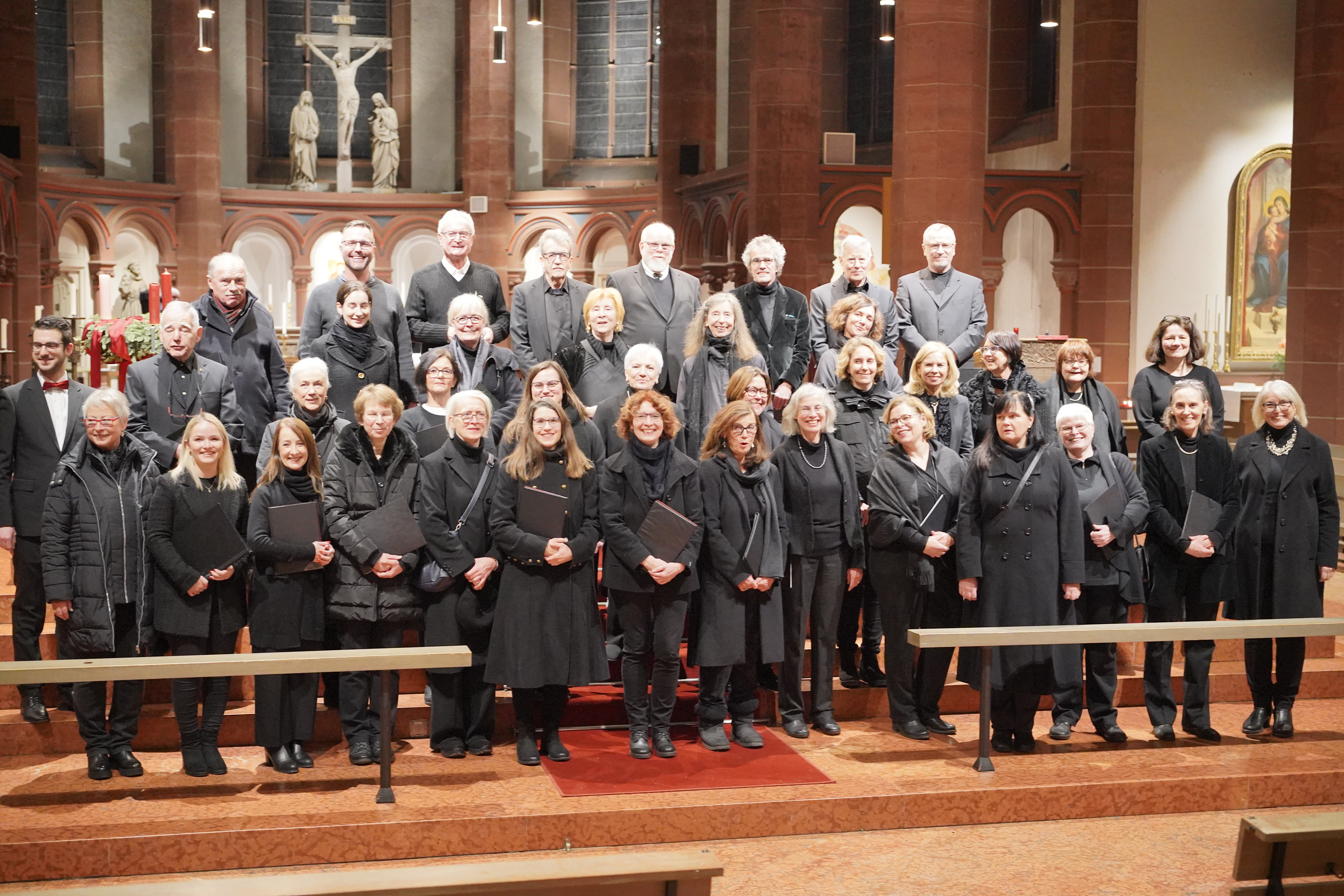
- The choir after Oratorio de Noël, 2022
- Origin: St. Bonifatius, Wiesbaden
- Founded: 1862
- Genre: Mixed church choir and children's choir
- Members: 107 and 24
- Chief conductor: Johannes Schröder
- Awards: Palestrina-Medaille; Zelter-Plakette; Goldene Stadtplakette Wiesbaden
- Website: www.bonifatius-wiesbaden.de/kirchenmusik/chor-st-bonifatius

The Chor von St. Bonifatius (Choir of St. Boniface) is a German mixed choir, the church choir of the parish St. Bonifatius, Wiesbaden. It was founded in 1862 as a male choir and was a mixed choir from 1887. From 1981 to 2018, it was conducted by Gabriel Dessauer, who founded two children's choirs. The group sang the first performance in Germany of John Rutter's Mass of the Children and performed in Azkoitia, San Sebastián, Görlitz, Bruges, Macon and Rome. Colin Mawby composed for the choir the Missa solemnis Bonifatius-Messe for the 150th anniversary, celebrated on 3 October 2012. From 2019, the choir has been conducted by Roman Twardy who conducted in his first concert Dvořák's Stabat Mater. On 1 January 2022, Johannes Schröder became church musician. He conducted as his first choral concert Verdi's Requiem in an arrangement for small ensemble.

== History ==
=== 1862 to 1981 ===
St. Bonifatius, the main Catholic church of Wiesbaden, the capital of Hesse, was consecrated in 1849. In 1862 a men's choir, intended to be a model for the singing of the congregation, was founded by teacher Johann Schickel (1862–1876). From 1876, the choir was conducted by Heinrich Link, but he resigned when boys were permitted to join. From 1887 the high parts were sung by boys, and from 1899 they were sung by female singers. The program for the 50th anniversary lists the oratorio Die heilige Elisabeth by August Wiltberger.

From 1919 to 1929, the director was Franz Xaver Schmitz. For the 60th anniversary, the choir performed the Missa "Mater admirabilis" by Peter Griesbacher in the service. From 1929 to 1952, Hermann Massenkeil conducted the choir. However, he was conscripted in the military during World War II, and his predecessor Schmitz returned. Massenkeil took detailed notes about the choir's history, mentioning for example that on 19 November 1933 the oratorio Die heilige Elisabeth by Joseph Haas was performed. On 16 January 1938, a celebration of the 75th anniversary of the church choir, it presented a cappella works in the Pontifical High Mass, and in a vespers service works from the "kirchenmusikalisches Schaffen zeitgenössischer Komponisten der Kölner, Münchener, Berliner und Wiener Schule" (sacred works by contemporary composers of the Munich, Berlin and Vienna school), for example Hans Lang's Laudate Domino and Franz Philipp's Tantum Ergo. The organ balcony was severely damaged by an air raid in World War II. The choir had to sing from the altar area until 1949.

During the "Festwoche zum 100jährigen Kirchjubiläum" (Festive week for centenary of the church) in 1962, the choir performed Palestrina's Mass "O admirabile commercium" and Bruckner's Locus iste. In a "Kirchenmusikalische Feierstunde zur Wiederherstellung der Bonifatiuskirche" (Festive hour of church music for the restoration of the church) on 7 May 1950, they sang the third part of the oratorio Das Lebensbuch Gottes by Haas and a cantata for St. Mary by Carl Thiel. The chronicle for the centenary summarises: "Die seit 1929 verzeichneten künstlerischen Ereignisse geben nun ein so überwältigendes Zeugnis lebendigster Anteilnahme des Chores und seiner Führung an den allgemeinreligiösen, liturgischen, kirchenmusikalischen und allgemeinkulturellen Belangen dieser Zeit ..." ("The artistic events recorded since 1929 stand now as a magnificent testimony to the very lively part played by the choir and its leadership in the general religious, liturgical, and church-music life and in the common cultural landscape of this period.").

From 1952, Günther Nierle was the director. Nierle had been organist at the Breslau Cathedral from 1935. He performed, among others, Hans Leo Hassler's Missa super Dixit Maria, Handel's Dettingen Te Deum and Mozart's Krönungsmesse. From 1963 to 1980, Peter Kempin was the cantor. He performed works by Monteverdi, Pergolesi, Schütz, Bach, Cherubini, Mendelsohn, Bruckner and Hindemith, partly for the first time in the city. The choir sang the premiere of the Mass Deutsche Messe mit Einheitsliedern for mixed choir, six brass players and congregational singing (1965) by Friedrich Zehm on 15 September 1968 in a festive service for the diocese, the Limburger Kreuzwoche (Limburg week of the Cross), with members of the Hessisches Staatsorchester. Kempin conducted the premiere of the Requiem by Christoph Straus (17th century), for soloists, choir and orchestra.

=== Gabriel Dessauer, 1981 to 2018 ===
From 1981, Gabriel Dessauer conducted the choir. He increased membership to about 107 members (as of 2012) and founded two children's choirs. He kept the tradition of singing mainly in services, including regularly a Mass with orchestra for Christmas and Easter, usually accompanied by members of the Hessisches Staatsorchester. Besides popular works by Haydn (Theresienmesse), Mozart (Sparrow Mass, Missa brevis in B♭ major, Coronation Mass), Beethoven (Mass in C major) and Schubert (Mass No. 2, Deutsche Messe), they performed in 2011 the Mass Nr. 1 in B♭ major by Johann Nepomuk Hummel. Michael Haydn's Missa tempore Quadragesimae and Missa Sancti Francisci Seraphici are also part of the choir's repertoire, as William Lloyd Webber's Missa Princeps Pacis of 1962.

==== Concerts ====
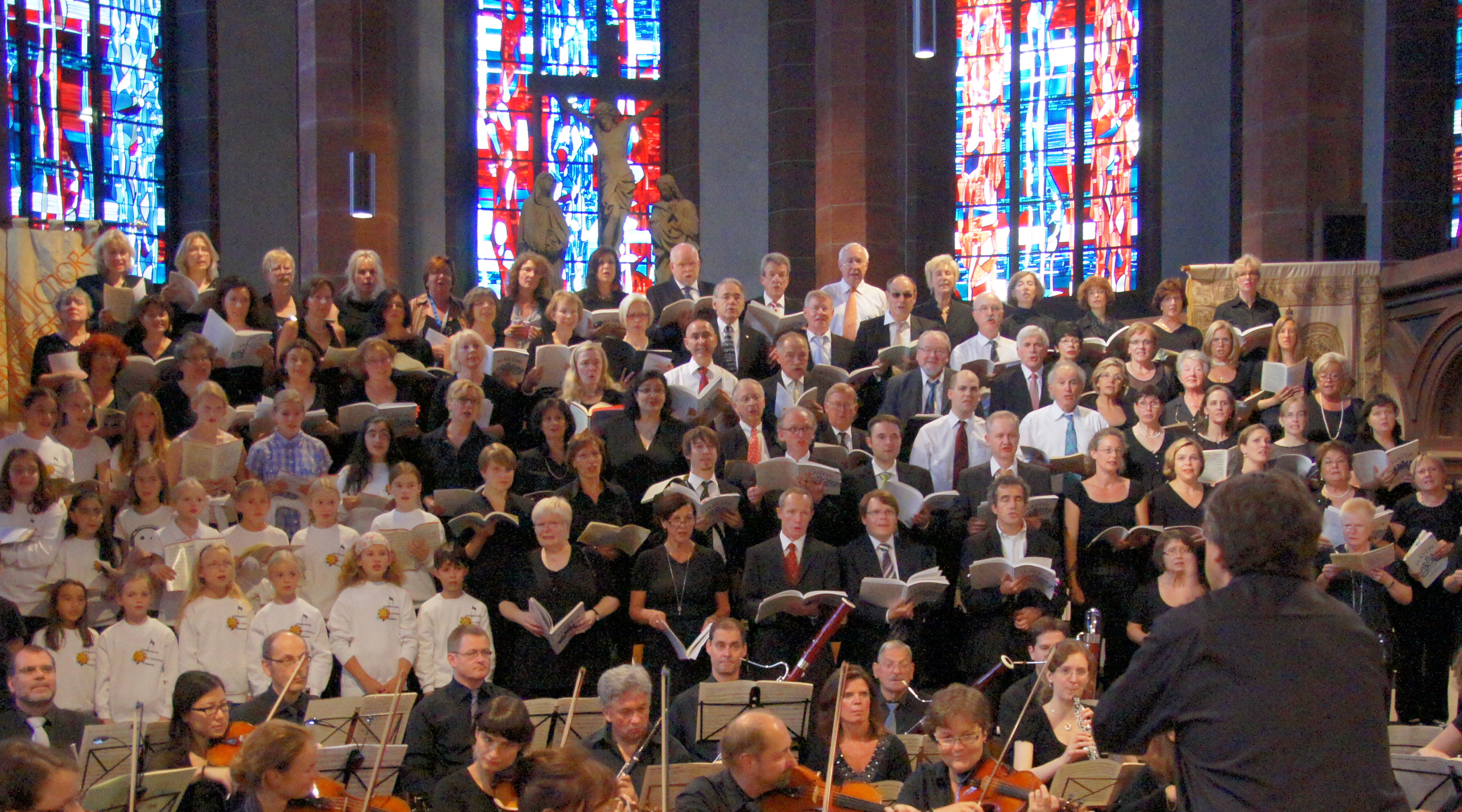
Chor und Kinderchor von St. Bonifatius, 3 October 2011, Haydn: Die Schöpfung

Once a year the choir performs a choral concert, since 1997 regularly on 3 October. They sang among others Mozart's Requiem, Schubert's Mass No. 5 in A♭, Ein deutsches Requiem by Brahms, Rossini's Petite messe solennelle, Gounod's St. Cecilia Mass, and Verdi's Requiem. Both Chor and Kinderchor appeared in performances of Hermann Suter's Le Laudi (1998 and 2007) and in 2004 in the German premiere of John Rutter's Mass of the Children. In 2006, Dessauer conducted Karl Jenkins' Requiem, composed in 2004. In 2010, works of Bach were performed, his Mass in G minor and choral movements from cantatas BWV 140, BWV 12, BWV 120 and BWV 29. In 2011 the choir sang Haydn's Die Schöpfung. The children's choir sang along with the soprano.

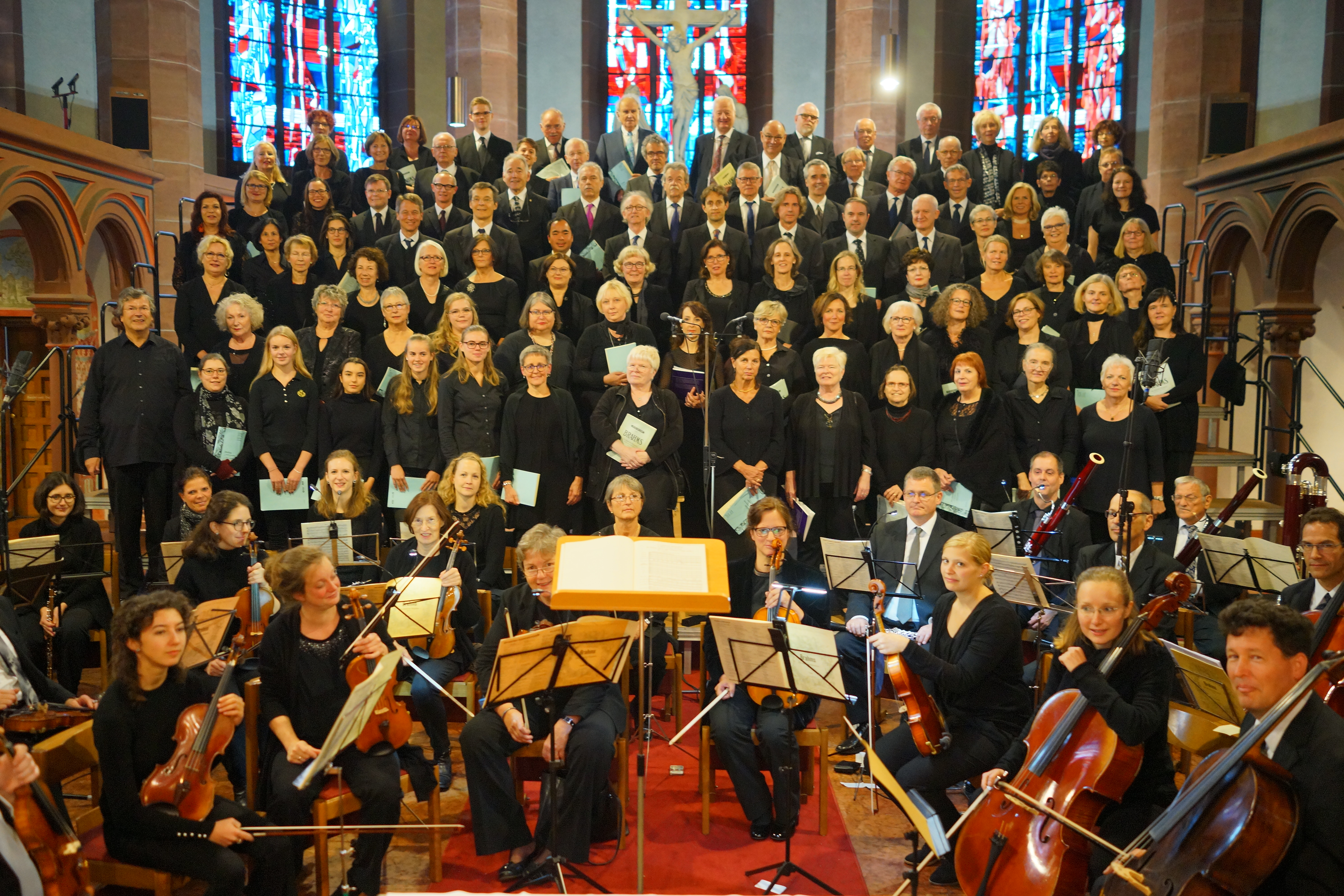
The choir and members of the Hessisches Staatsorchester, 3 October 2018, Brahms: Ein deutsches Requiem

To celebrate the 150th anniversary of the choir in 2012, Dessauer commissioned Colin Mawby to compose the Missa solemnis Bonifatius-Messe. Mawby wrote the Mass in 2011 for the forces available at the church, soprano, choir, children's choir, oboe and organ, premiered on 3 October 2012. The organist was Ignace Michiels from St. Salvator's Cathedral in Bruges, soprano Natascha Jung, oboist Leonie Dessauer. A second performance was given on 3 November in the Frankfurter Dom, with organist Andreas Boltz. In 2013 the choir performed Schubert's Mass No. 6 along with his Unfinished Symphony. The concert of 2014 was devoted to John Rutter's Magnificat. In 2016, the choir performed Mendelssohn's Elias a second time, now in the church. The concert of 2017 was Der Messias, Mozart's arrangement of Handel's Messiah. In 2018, the choir performed Ein deutsches Requiem by Johannes Brahms, with soloists Marina Hermann and Johannes Hill.

The choir sang in 1986 in Azkoitia and San Sebastián, in two churches with a Cavaillé-Coll organ, in 1987 in the Limburg Cathedral, in 1990 in the cathedral St. Jakobus, Görlitz, in 1996 in Memphis, Tennessee, and Macon, Georgia. In Rome in 2008, the choir sang a concert in San Paolo dentro le Mura of Vivaldi's Gloria and Haydn's Nelson-Messe, and a Mass in St. Peter's Basilica.

==== Projects ====
In 1999 the choir sang together with the choir Cantores in Bruges' St. Salvator's Cathedral and in [Wiesbaden a program to bring jointly to a close a century of violence. The cantors Michiels (organ) and Dessauer chose Jules Van Nuffel's In convertendo Dominus, Rudolf Mauersberger's Wie liegt die Stadt so wüst, and Duruflé's Requiem.

In 1995, the choir joined other international for a memorial concert of the 50th anniversary of the end of World War II. On 8 May, Britten's War Requiem was performed in a ceremony of the government of Hesse at the Kurhaus Wiesbaden, with choirs from countries who were opponents during the war, the Swindon Choral Society from Swindon, UK, the Macon Civic Chorale from Macon, Georgia, and the Schiersteiner Kantorei, conducted by Martin Lutz. A year later they took part in a performance of the work with similar forces in Macon.

=== Roman Twardy, 2019 to 2021 ===
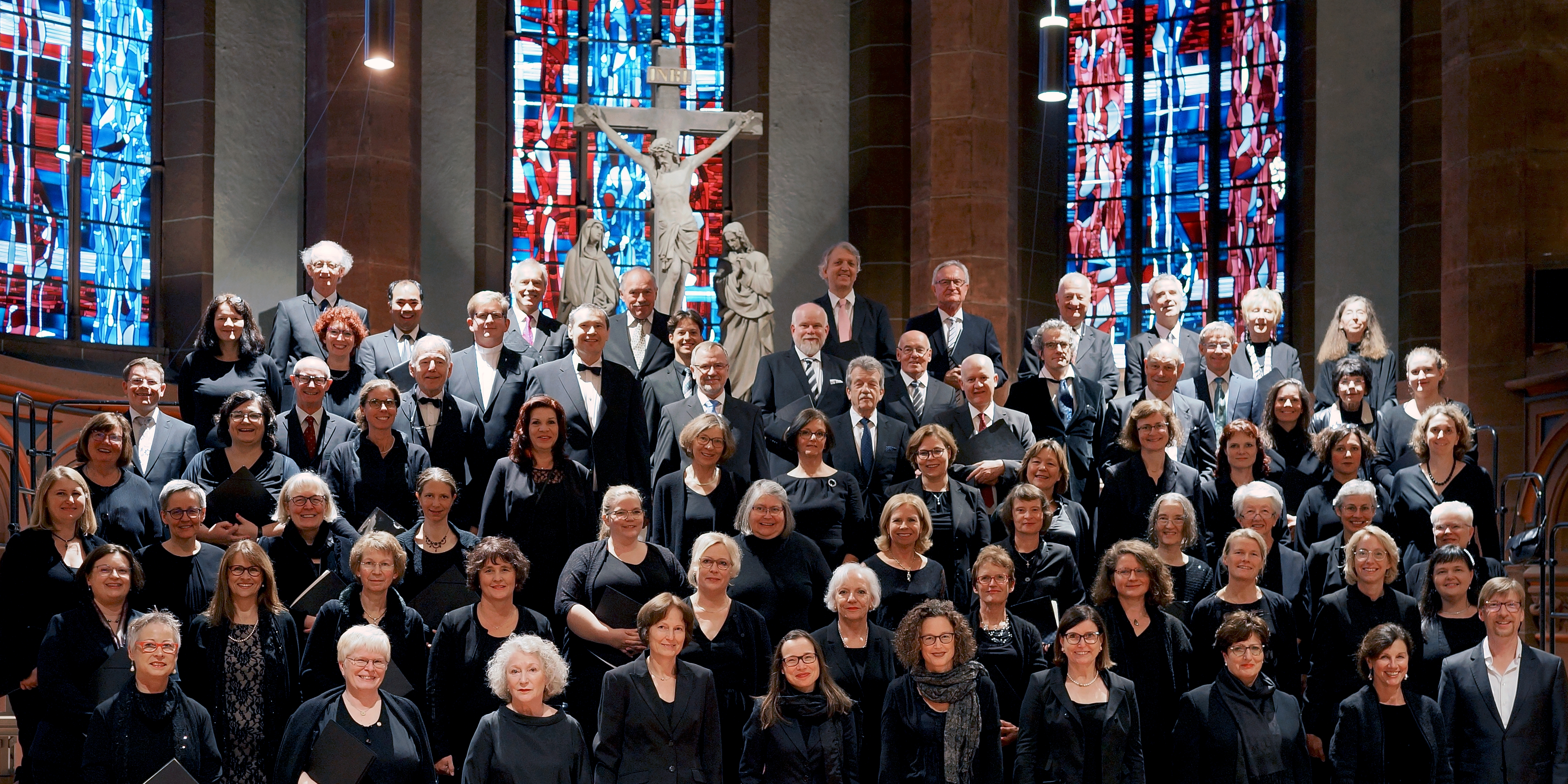
Dvořák: Stabat Mater, choir before the concert, Roman Twardy bottom right, 26 October 2019

From 2019, Roman Twardy was the interim conductor of the Chor von St. Bonifatius in Wiesbaden, succeeding Gabriel Dessauer. With a focus on a cappella singing, he introduced composers of the 20th century, music such as Knut Nystedt's Missa brevis, Józef Świder's Missa angelica and Arvo Pärt's The Deer's Cry. His first choral concert was on 26 October 2019 Dvořák's Stabat Mater, with the choir, members of the orchestra of the Hessisches Staatstheater Wiesbaden, and soloists including soprano Betsy Horne and bass Johannes Hill. A review noted fine intonation and rhythmic precision as the result of months of hard work.

On 3 October 2021, during the COVID-19 pandemic, he conducted Rossini's Petite messe solennelle.

=== Johannes Schröder, from 2022 ===
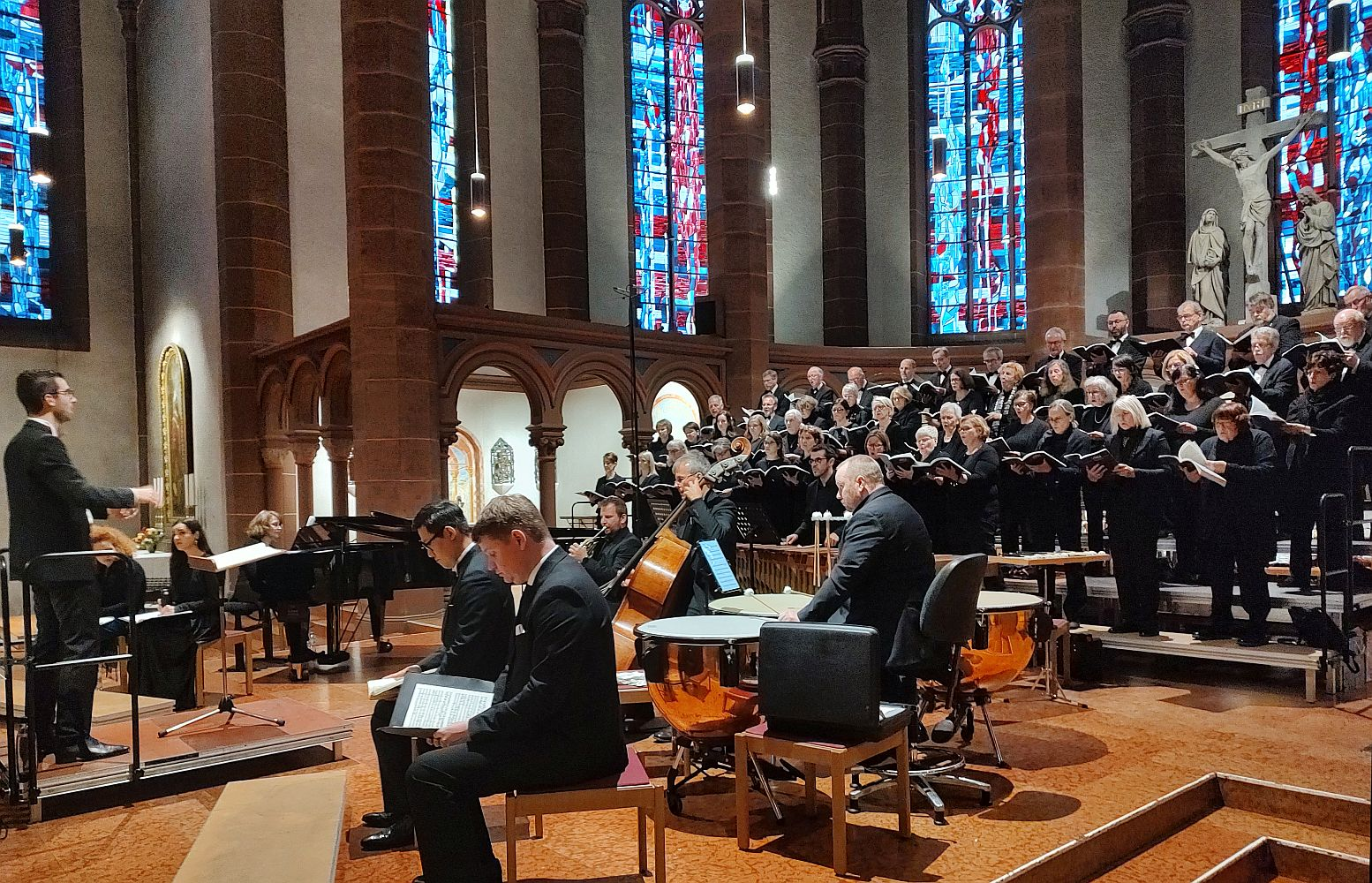
Verdi's Messa di Requiem, 3 October 2022, Johannes Schröder conducting

From 1 January 2022, Johannes Schröder has been church musician at St. Bonifatius, including choir conductor. He chose for his first choral concert Verdi's Messa di Requiem in an arrangement for small ensemble. The choir performed with soloists Talia Or, Silvia Hauer, Sung Min Song and Johannes Hill, and members of the Hessisches Staatsorchester. On 11 December 2022, the choir performed the Oratorio de Noël by Camille Saint-Saëns with soloists and members of the Hessisches Staatsorchester in an Advent concert.

== Recordings ==
- Hermann Suter: Le Laudi, Zofia Kilanowicz, Pamela Pantos, Andreas Karasiak, Johann Werner Prein, Chor von St. Bonifatius, Kinderchor von St. Bonifatius, Witold Lutoslawski Philharmonic Wroclaw, 1999

== Awards ==
In 1971, the choir received the Palestrina-Medaille of the Cäcilien-Verband. In 1972, it was awarded the Zelter-Plakette, founded by Theodor Heuss for choirs serving culture for more than hundred years. In 2012, the choir was awarded the "Goldene Plakette der Landeshauptstadt Wiesbaden" (Plaque in Gold of Wiesbaden).
