= Johannes Schröder =

German organist, composer and Catholic church musician

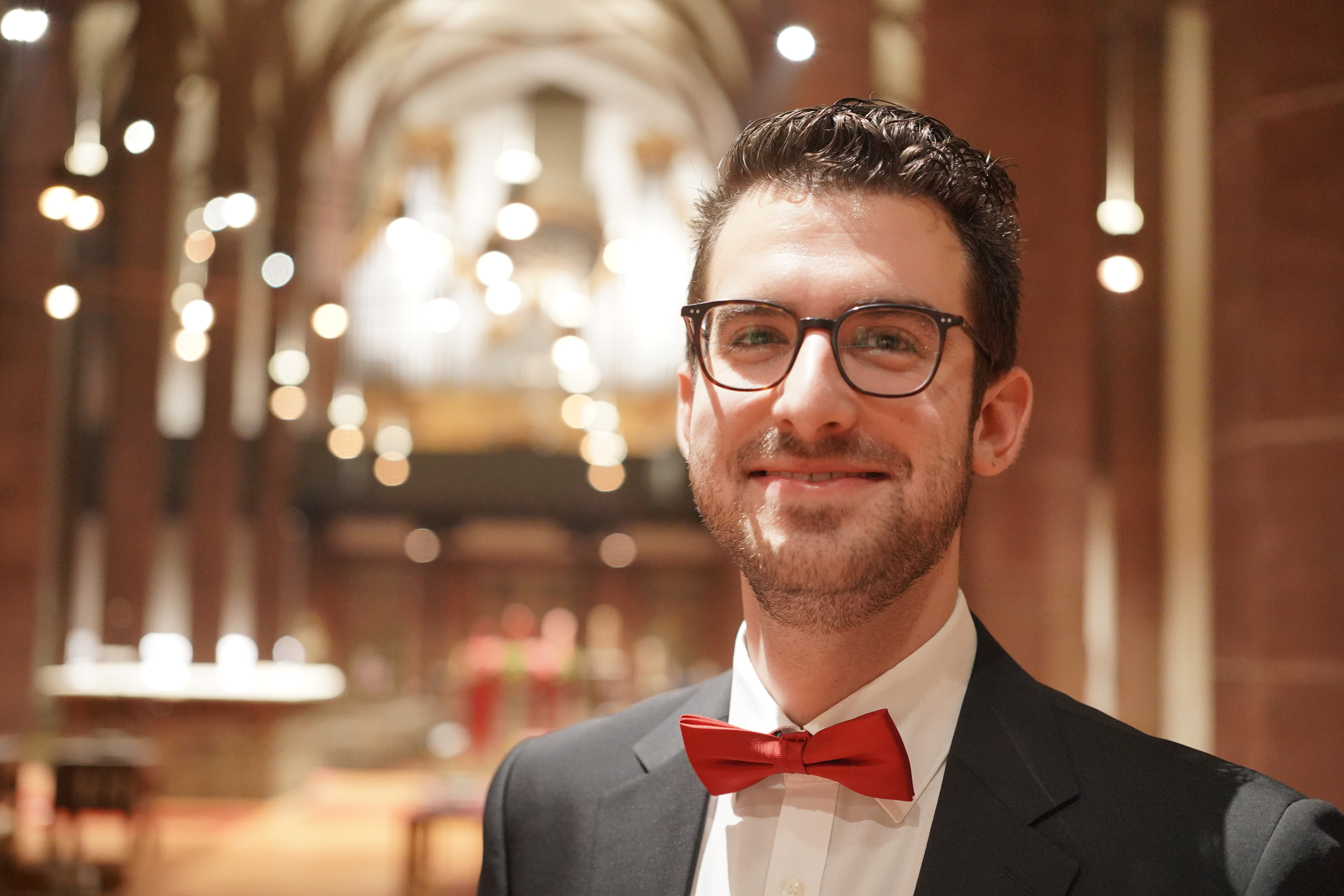
- Schröder in 2022
- Born: 3 October 1991 (age 34); Hachenburg, Rhineland-Palatinate, Germany
- Education: Hochschule für Musik und Tanz Köln; University of Mainz
- Occupations: Organist; Composer; Church musician
- Organizations: Westerwälder Dom; St. Bonifatius, Wiesbaden

Johannes M. Schröder (born 3 October 1991) is a German organist, composer and Catholic church musician. After several years responsible for the church music at the Westerwälder Dom, he moved to St. Bonifatius, Wiesbaden. He is also a lecturer and a music editor.

== Life ==
Born in Hachenburg in the Westerwald, Schröder received instructions in piano and composition from age 12, and began learning the organ a year later. He studied liturgical and concert organ playing with the Würzburg Cathedral organist Stefan Schmidt from 2009 to 2012. He also received organ instructions from Peter Domjak in Essen and Frédéric Blanc in Paris.

Schröder studied Catholic church music and concert organ at the Hochschule für Musik und Tanz Köln from 2011 to 2017, specifically literature play and improvisation with Johannes Geffert and Thierry Mechler, and composition (Tonsatz) with Johannes Schild. He received a scholarship from the Stiftung DEY of the Diocese of Limburg.

In May 2014, Schröder became church musician (hauptamtlicher Kirchenmusiker) at St. Bonifatius in Wirges, also known as Westerwälder Dom. He has played concerts in cathedral churches of Cologne, Limburg, Riga and Speyer, and at the Kölner Philharmonie. He was the organist for the world premiere of Peter Reulein's oratorio Laudato si' at the Limburg Cathedral on 6 November 2016.

Schröder pursued a doctor's degree, beginning in 2019, in music theory at the Hochschule für Musik Mainz, supervised by Birger Petersen. He was promoted in February 2022. His research focus is on French music around 1900. He has been a lecturer of harmony and work analysis (Harmonielehre und Werkanalyse) at the Wiesbadener Musikakademie from April 2014. Succeeding Gabriel Dessauer, he became responsible for church music at St. Bonifatius, Wiesbaden, on 1 January 2022.

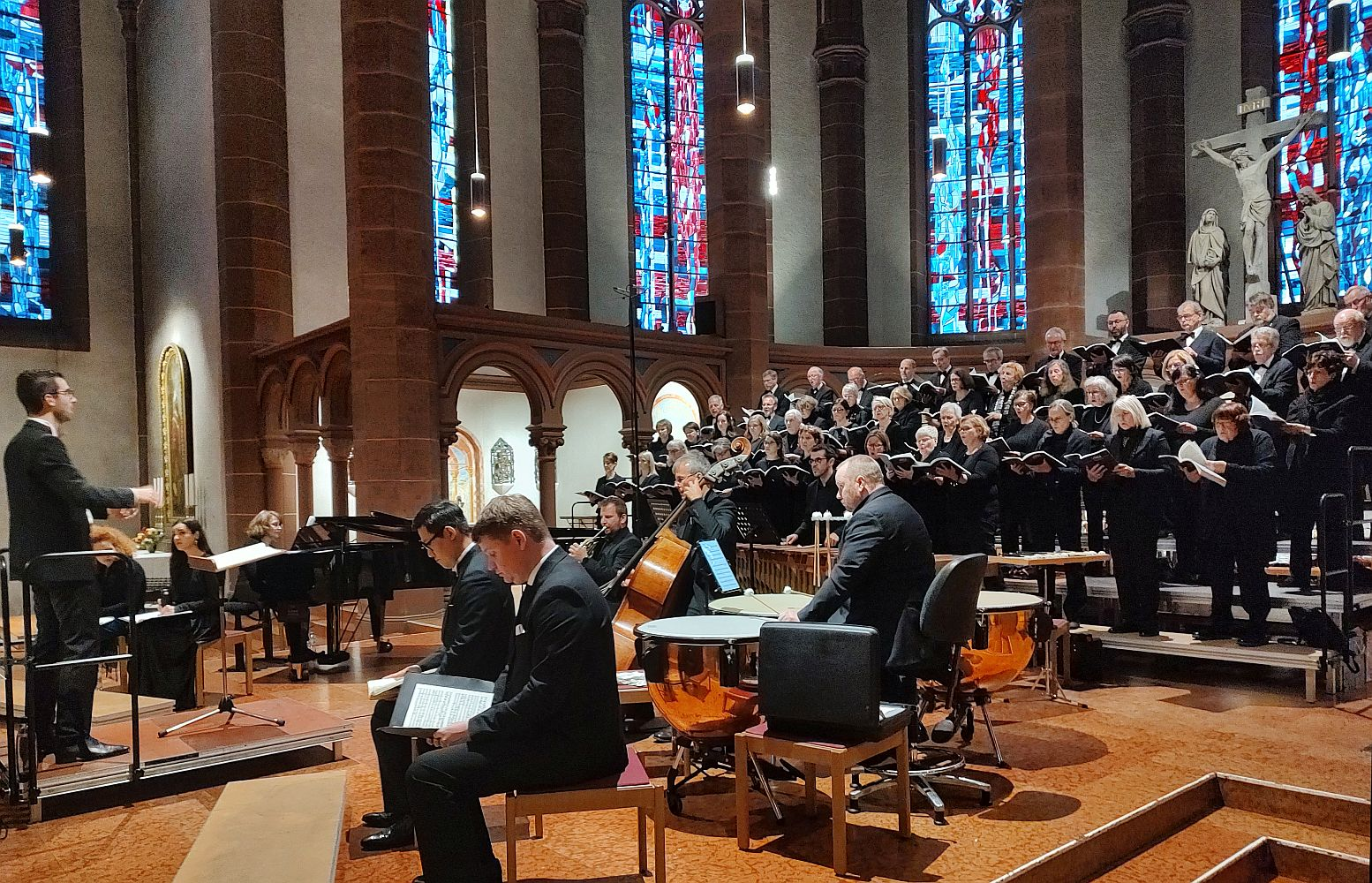
Conducting Verdi's Messa di Requiem on 3 October 2022

He chose for his first choral concert on 3 October 2022 Verdi's Messa di Requiem in an arrangement for small ensemble. The Chor von St. Bonifatius performed with soloists Talia Or, Silvia Hauer, Sung Min Song and Johannes Hill, and members of the Hessisches Staatsorchester. On 11 December 2022 he conducted the Oratorio de Noël by Saint-Saëns.

== Works ==
Schröder has composed sacred music for choir and organ, including chorale preludes for the Gotteslob hymnal. His oratorio Beati Pauperes. Selig, die arm sind vor Gott was commissioned in 2019 by the Diocese of Limburg to commemorate Katharina Kaspar, a nun from Dernbach in the Westerwald (now in the Diocese of Limburg) who was canonised as a saint in 2018. Its text, written by Helmut Schlegel, is based on the Beatitudes. The Elberfelder Requiem was written for a commission to write contemporary settings for the Latin liturgical chants for All Souls' Day. His compositions were published by Carus-Verlag, B-Note and Dehm Verlag.

- Chorale preludes for Gotteslob
- Missa simplex für Chor (SATB) and organ, B-Note, Hagen im Bremischen, ISMN 979-0-5021-8546-6.
- Elberfelder Requiem for choir (SATB), cello and organ, B-Note Musikverlag, Hagen im Bremischen 2012, ISMN 979-0-5021-8679-1.
- Beati Pauperes. Selig, die arm sind vor Gott, oratorio for soloists, choir, children's choir and orchestra, Dehm-Verlag, Limburg 2019, ISBN 978-3-943302-57-8.
- Dehm, Patrick; Schröder, Johannes (2021). Neue geistliche Literatur für Frauenchöre 31 Sätze für mehrstimmigen Frauenchor mit und ohne Begleitung (in German). Limburg. ISBN 978-3-943302-76-9. OCLC 1286802921.
- Dehm, Patrick (2021). Auf dem Weg durch diese Nacht (in German). Limburg. ISBN 978-3-943302-75-2. OCLC 1301276525.

=== Thesis ===
- Schröder, Johannes M. (2022). Henri Mulet Studien zur Orgelmusik (in German). Limburg: Dehm Verlag e.K. ISBN 978-3-943302-68-4. OCLC 1344330322.

=== Discography ===
- Dupré, Marcel; Schröder, Johannes; Ticheli, Frank; Twardowski, Romuald; Ramroth, Martin (2018), Te Deum Dupré – Schröder – Ticheli – Twardowski (in multiple languages), [Kölbingen]: WestWood Sounds, OCLC 1129934624
- Schröder, Johannes (2022), Spitzenklang im Weinbauland Die Klais-Orgel von St. Bartholomäus Zornheim (in German), [Limburg /Lahn]: Dehm-Verlag, OCLC 1347353209
