= Johannes Hill =

German opera singer

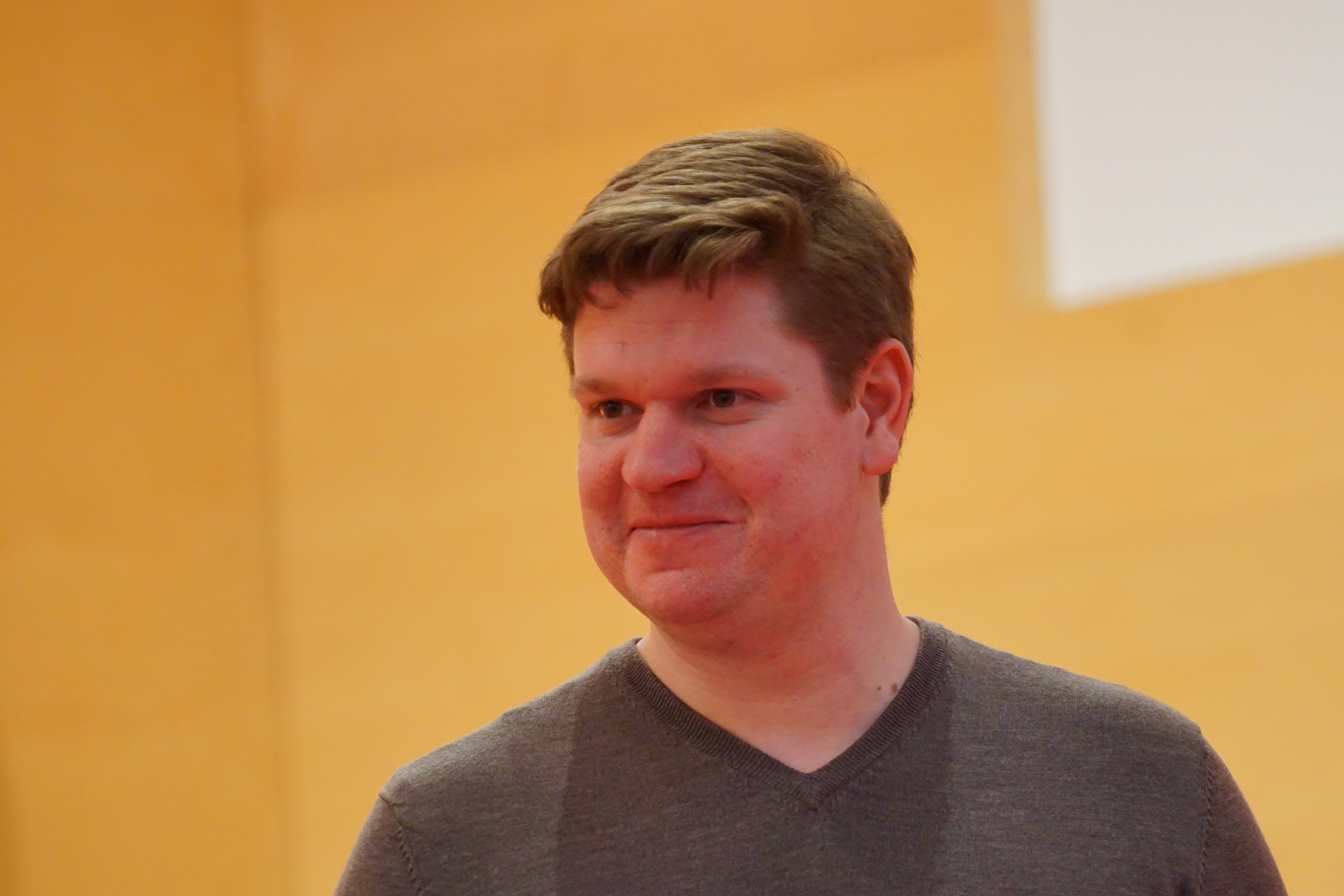
- Born: 1988 or 1989; Taunusstein, Hesse, Germany
- Education: Hochschule für Musik Mainz
- Occupation: Baritone
- Website: www.johannes-hill.de

Johannes Hill (born 1988) is a German baritone in concert and in oratorios, who has performed internationally. Singing in choirs from age 10, he has performed major roles in oratorios, such as both Jesus and Pilate in Bach's Passions, and Pope Francis in the premiere of Laudato si'. He has also performed in vocal ensembles such as Kammerchor Stuttgart and Collegium Vocale Gent.

== Career ==
Born in Taunusstein, Hill sang as a boy from age ten as a member of the choir Idsteiner Kantorei, where his first concert was in 1999 Christus by Friedrich Kiel. He was also a member of the boys' choir Wiesbadener Knabenchor, where he was also a soloist. He studied voice at the Hochschule für Musik Mainz with Hans-Christoph Begemann, graduating with a diploma in 2015. He took master classes with Ton Koopman, Helmuth Rilling and Andreas Scholl, among others.

He has focused on singing in concert and in oratorios. His first concert as a soloist with the Idsteiner Kantorei was in 2011 Fauré's Requiem. In 2014, he appeared at the Hochschule as Nardo in Mozart's opera La finta giardiniera, and at the festival Internationale Maifestspiele Wiesbaden in a concert performance of Domenico Mazzochi's La catena d'Adone. In 2015, he sang the bass parts in Bach cantatas with the Deutscher Kammerchor and Kammerorchester Basel, conducted by Andreas Scholl who also sang two alto solo cantatas, at the great hall of the Alte Oper in Frankfurt. They repeated the program on a tour to Switzerland and France, including the Théâtre des Champs-Élysées in Paris. Hill appeared at the Zelenka Festival in both Prague and Dresden in 2016, singing as a member of the Kammerchor Stuttgart and a soloist in two works by Jan Dismas Zelenka, the Missa Dei Filii, ZWV 20, and the Miserere in C-minor, ZWV 57. He performed the role of Pope Francis in the premiere of Peter Reulein's oratorio Laudato si' at the Limburg Cathedral in 2016, conducted by the composer. The same year, he was a soloist in Ein deutsches Requiem by Johannes Brahms, performed by the Idsteiner Kantorei and the Nassauische Kammerphilharmonie, conducted by Carsten Koch, in St. Martin, Idstein. He has been a regular soloist with the choir Junge Kantorei, performing in Schubert's Mass in G major and the role of Pilate in a scenic version of Bach's St. John Passion ("Die Freiheit, die Fesseln trägt" - Eine szenische Collage. J. S. Bach, Johannespassion, und der Prozess um die Märtyrer des Widerstandes vor dem Volksgerichtshof 1945) in churches in Frankfurt, Heidelberg and Marburg. He was the bass soloist in Haydn's Theresienmesse, performed in the service on Christmas Day 2017 at St. Bonifatius, Wiesbaden, by Chor von St. Bonifatius and members of the Hessisches Staatsorchester, conducted by Gabriel Dessauer.

As a member of vocal ensembles, Hill toured Israel with the Kammerchor Stuttgart, conducted by Frieder Bernius, performing Ein deutsches Requiem in 2015, and the same year sang with the Chor-Akademie Lübeck in Shanghai and Beijing, the first performances in China of Arnold Schönberg's Gurre-Lieder. He also performed with the Collegium Vocale Gent. He recorded Bach's St Matthew Passion with the Kammerchor Stuttgart in 2015, singing the role of Pilate.

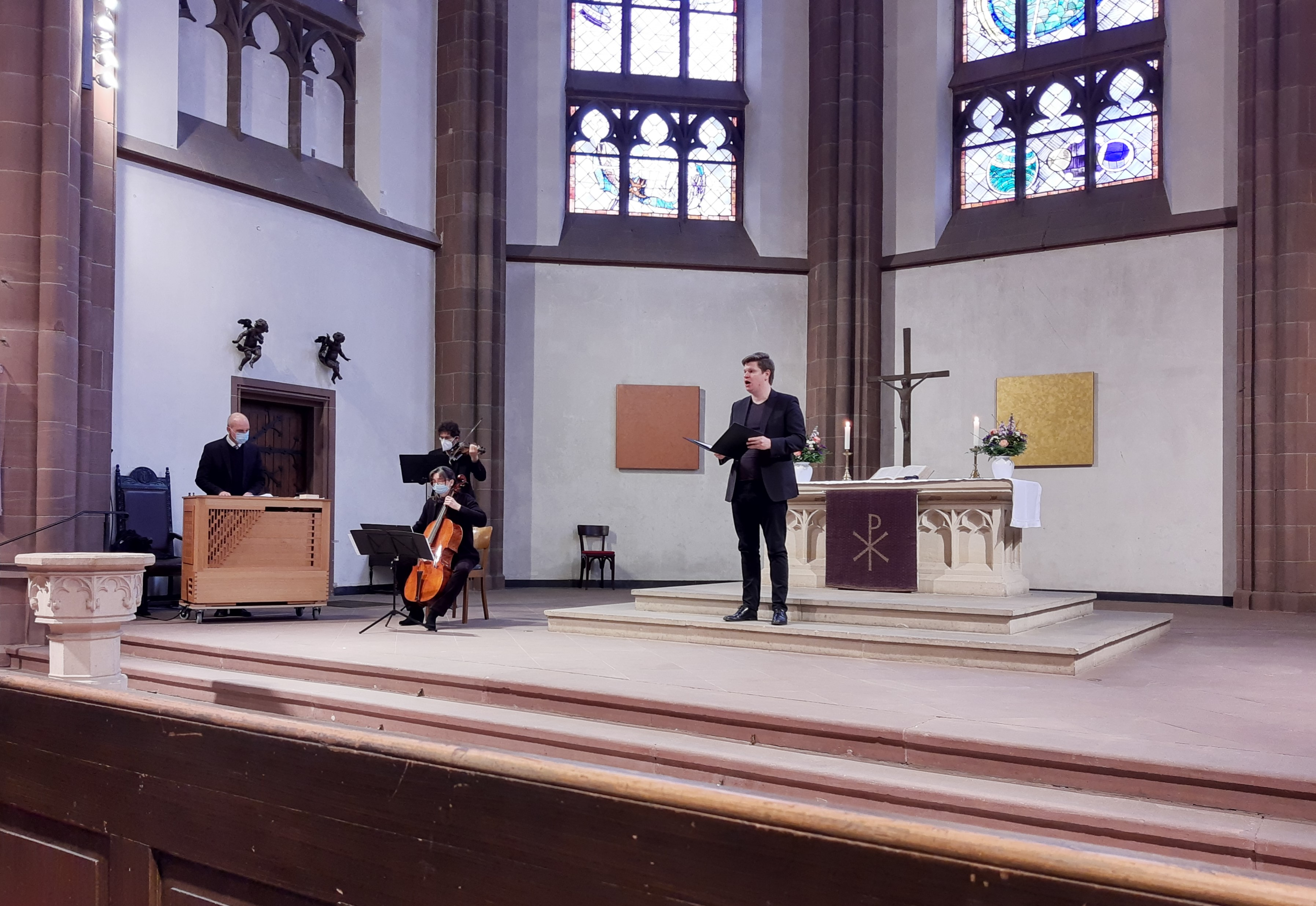
Cantata service, 21 March 2021, Telemann's Ich will den Kreuzweg gerne gehen

In 2017, Hill was the vox Christi (voice of Christ) in Bach's St John Passion in a performance with the Ensemble Paulinum and the Baroque orchestra Pulchra Musica at St. Paulus, Worms, also singing the Bass arias. A reviewer noted that he expressed the character's sovereign firmness (souveräne Festigkeit) and touching care (berührend die Fürsorge) for his mother, and also the interpretation of the emotional arias.

On 26 October 2019, he was the bass soloist in Dvořák's Stabat Mater in a concert with the Chor von St. Bonifatius, members of the orchestra of the Hessisches Staatstheater Wiesbaden, conducted by Roman Twardy. A reviewer singled him out among the soloists and noted the mellow timbre of his voice, carrying effortlessly ("der mühelos tragfähige, warm und weich timbrierte Bass ..."). Hill has been a regular soloist in cantata services at the Dreikönigskirche, Frankfurt, which were continued with solo cantatas during the COVID-19 pandemic, including a service during Lent with Telemann's cantata Ich will den Kreuzweg gerne gehen, composed for bass, violin and continuo.

On 3 October 2022, he was the bass soloist in Verdi's Requiem at St. Bonifatius, Wiesbaden, in a version for small ensemble, performing with soprano Talia Or, mezzo-soprano Silvia Hauer, tenor Sung Min Song, and members of the Hessisches Staatsorchester conducted by Johannes Schröder.
