= Wiltberger =

Wiltberger is a German surname. Notable people with the surname include:

- August Wiltberger (1850–1928), German classical composer, music director, and professor
- Christian Wiltberger (1769–1851), American silversmith
- Marc Wiltberger (born 1969), French handball player
