= Roman Twardy =

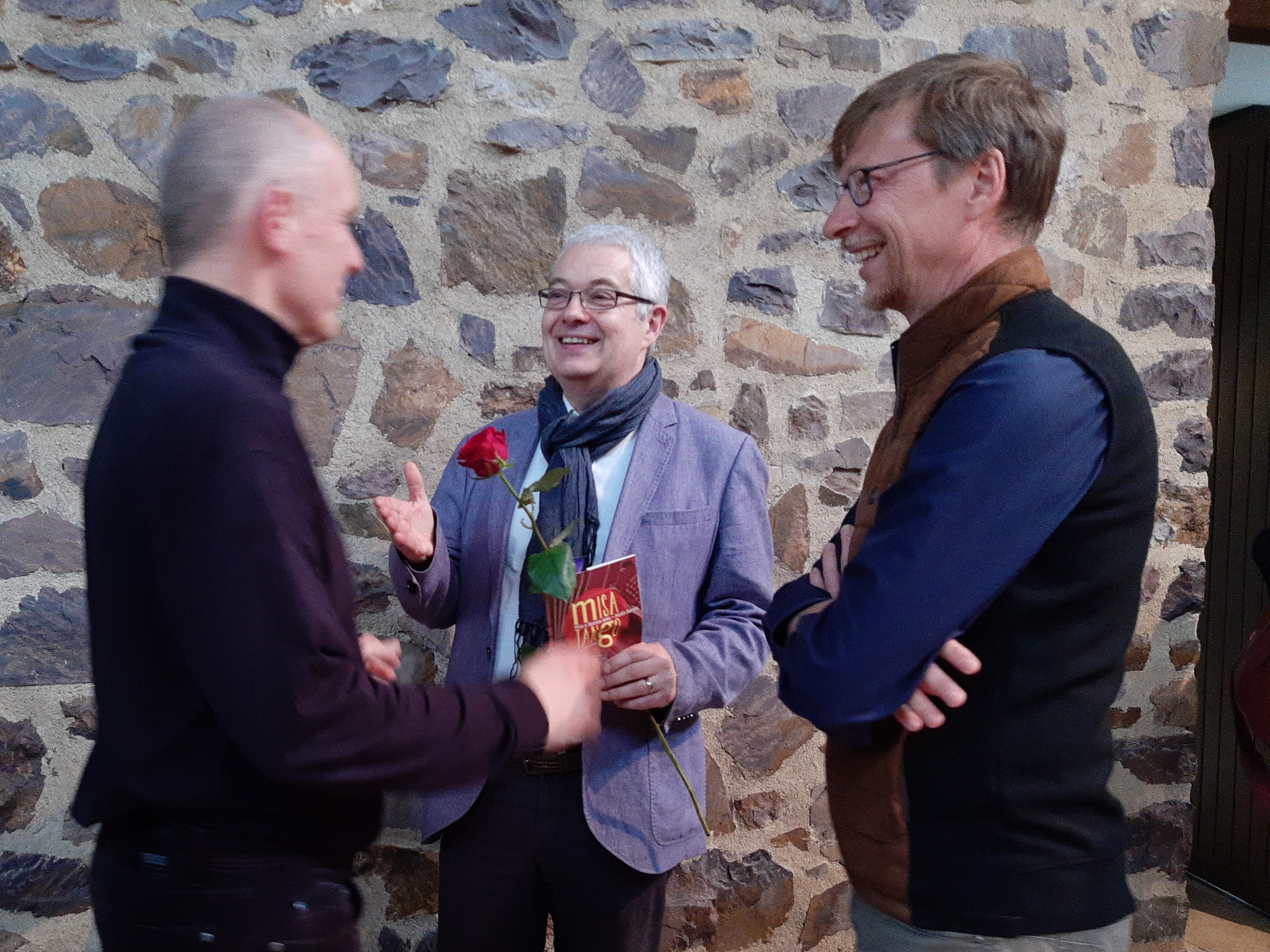
- Twardy (right) after a performance of the Te Deum by Peter Reulein (centre) at St. Martin, Idstein, with Franz Fink (left) who conducted on 7 May 2023
- Education: Musikhochschule Mainz; Hochschule für Musik Hanns Eisler
- Occupations: Teacher; Choral conductor
- Organizations: Wiesbadener Knabenchor; Musikhochschule Mainz; Internatsschule Schloss Hansenberg; Chor von St. Bonifatius
- Awards: Kulturpreis Wiesbaden

Roman Twardy is a German teacher, academic lecturer and the conductor of the Wiesbadener Knabenchor boys' choir in Wiesbaden, Hesse, Germany. The choir appears internationally and has made recordings. From 2019, Twardy is also interim conductor of the church choir Chor von St. Bonifatius in Wiesbaden.

== Career ==
Twardy was introduced to music as a member of the Kiedricher Chorbuben boys' choir. He studied musicology, music pedagogy and composition at the Musikhochschule Mainz and choral conducting at the Hochschule für Musik Hanns Eisler in Berlin.

He taught music at the Oranienschule in Wiesbaden, including the theatre group, orchestra and string classes. He was also a lecturer of composition (Tonsatz) and listening (Hörschulung) at the Musikhochschule Mainz. He is a teacher of German studies and music at a boarding school for gifted children, the Internatsschule Schloss Hansenberg.

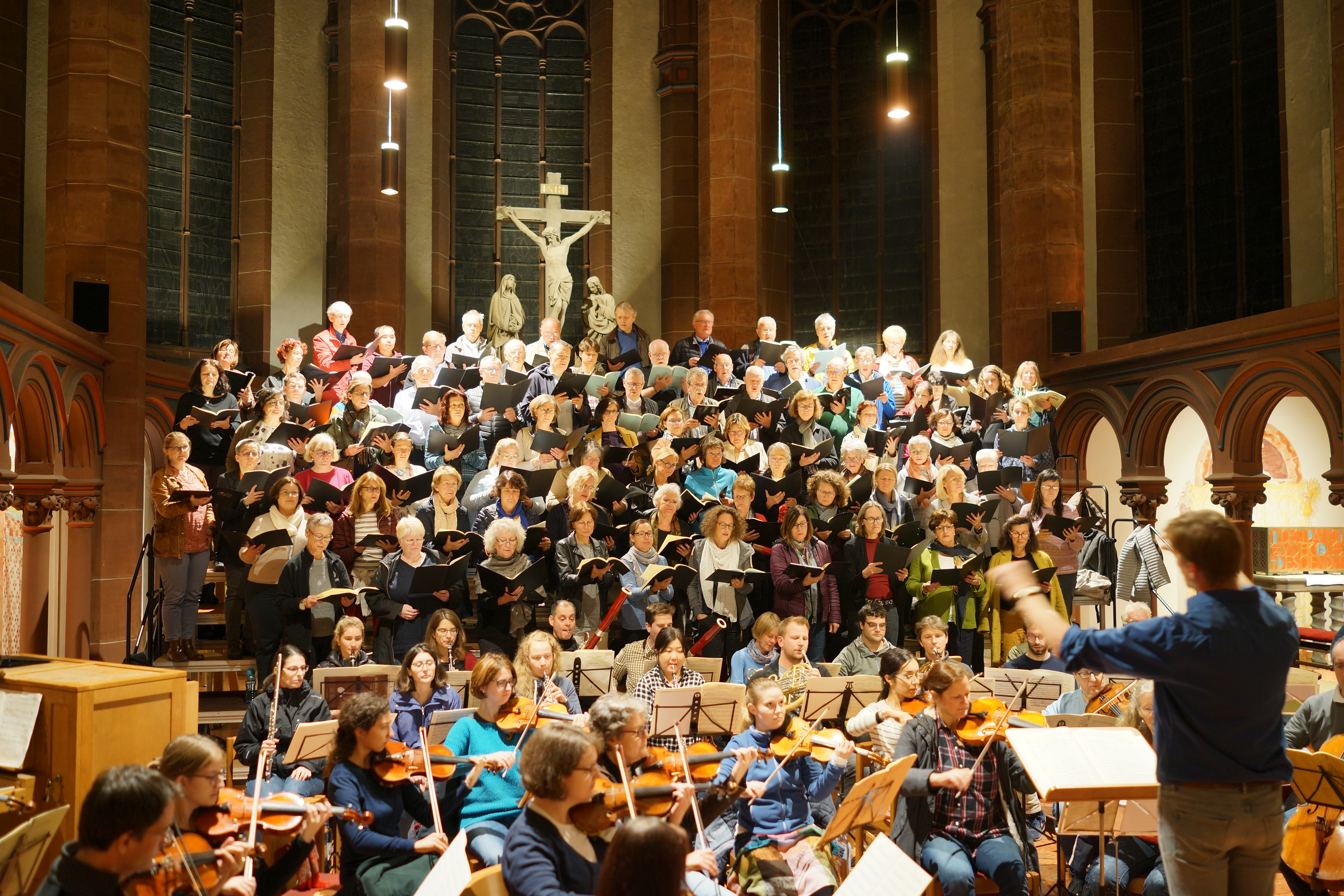
Dress rehearsal for Dvořák's Stabat Mater, 25 October 2019

Twardy has been the conductor of the Wiesbadener Knabenchor boys' choir since 2001, leading them in concerts, on tours and for recordings. In 2005, they made the first recording of Johann Mattheson's Passion oratorio Das Lied des Lammes, which had been lost. Twardy chose works from the 16th to the 21st century, including compositions by Johann Sebastian Bach, Felix Mendelssohn, Johannes Brahms, Robert Schumann and Sylke Zimpel, for a CD in 2009, when the choir celebrated its 50th anniversary. In 2010, he conducted the choir in a concert of Handel's Messiah at the Marktkirche Wiesbaden, with soloists Elisabeth Scholl, Andreas Scholl, Andreas Karasiak and Florian Plock. The choir performs regularly in concerts during Advent in Wiesbaden churches such as St. Bonifatius and the Christuskirche. For their artistic work as "ambassadors" of the capital, Twardy and the choir were awarded the Culture Prize of the City of Wiesbaden in 2013.

From 2019, Twardy has been the interim conductor of the Chor von St. Bonifatius in Wiesbaden, succeeding Gabriel Dessauer. In his first choral concert there on 26 October 2019, he conducted Dvořák's Stabat Mater with the choir, members of the orchestra of the Hessisches Staatstheater Wiesbaden, and soloists including soprano Betsy Horne and bass Johannes Hill. A review noted the good preparation over months, leading to fine intonation and rhythmic precision, especially in a cappella passages.
