= Günther Nierle =

German conductor and organist

Günther Nierle was a German conductor and organist. He was organist at the Breslau Cathedral from 1935. From 1952 until his death in 1962 he was cantor at St. Bonifatius, Wiesbaden. He conducted the choir Chor von St. Bonifatius in, among others, Hans Leo Hassler's Missa "Dixit Maria", Handel's Dettingen Te Deum and Mozart's Krönungsmesse.
