= Sung Min Song =

- Born: Seoul, South Korea
- Education: Musikhochschule München
- Occupation: Operatic tenor
- Organizations: Nationaltheater Mannheim
- Website: www.tenorsong.com

Sung Min Song (Korean: 송성민) is a South Korean operatic tenor who has performed internationally, based in Germany. He is focused on Italian opera and 19th-century oratorios including Puccini's Messa di Gloria and Verdi's Requiem. A member of the Saarländisches Staatstheater from 2017, he is capable of performing tenor roles with a high tessitura such as Arnold in Rossini's Guillaume Tell.

== Life and career ==
Sung min Song was born in Seoul. He was first an informatics engineer. His church choir director advised him to turn to solo singing, and he began to study it at age 26. He studied further from 2011 at the Hochschule für Musik und Theater München, singing in the opera chorus of the Bavarian State Opera from the 2012/13 season. He studied in the master class of Frieder Lang from 2011 to 2015, and during the last year also Belcanto with Daniel Kotlinski.

After his studies, Song became soon a soloist of international demand. In 2014, he appeared in a concert version of Feuersnot, with the Münchner Rundfunkorchester conducted by Ulf Schirmer. It was recorded by CPO.

Sung min Song has been a member of the Saarländisches Staatstheater in Saarbrücken from 2017. He first appeared there in the demanding role of Arnold in Rossini's Guillaume Tell, which has an extremely high tessitura. It was live-streamed by Arte. Other leading roles there included Mozart's Tamino in Die Zauberflöte and Ferrando In Così fan tutte, the title roles of Gounod's Faust and Verdi's Don Carlos, Alfredo in La Traviata and in Bizet's Die Perlenfischer.

Song performed as a guest at the Opéra de Marseille, the Opéra national de Lorraine, and at the festivals Munich Opera Festival, Tiroler Festspiele in Erl, Rheingau Musik Festival, Kissinger Sommer and Schleswig-Holstein Musik Festival. At the Star & Rising Stars Festival in Munich, he performed alongside Simone Kermes on 17 July 2021. He sang at the Berliner Philharmonie, the Gewandhaus in Leipzig, the Gasteig in Munich, Kölner Philharmonie, Alte Oper in Frankfurt and Palau de la Música de València, among others. In 2019, he performed as Arnold again at the Tiroler Festspiele Erl, an Austrian opera festival, conducted by Michael Güttler. In the 2022/23 season, Song portrayed the Prince in Dvořák's Rusalka at the Komische Oper Berlin, directed by Barrie Kosky.

=== Concert ===
In 2016, Sung min Song took part in a radio production of Bayerischer Rundfunk of Rossini's Stabat Mater with the Bamberger Symphoniker conducted by Alain Altinoglu. The same year, he was the solo tenor in Beethoven's Missa solemnis in two performances in Valencia, with soloists Simona Šaturová, Elisabeth Kulman, and his teacher Kotlinski, the Philharmonia Chorus and the Orquesta de Valencia conducted by Yaron Traub. In 2018, he sang in performances of Verdi's Messa da Requiem; Kent Nagano conducted both at the Rheingau Musik Festival and at the Herkulessaal of the Residenz in Munich in memory of Enoch zu Guttenberg. MDR Kultur aired a concert of Puccini's Messa di Gloria with the MDR Orchestra and MDR Rundfunkchor conducted by Domingo Hindoyan at the Gewandhaus in Leipzig, opening the saison in 2019. He performed the part also with Philharmonischer Chor Bochum and Bochumer Symphoniker, conducted by Magdalena Klein at the Anneliese Brost Musikforum Ruhr the same year. On 3 October 2022, he sang Verdi's Requiem again, with Talia Or, Silvia Hauer, Johannes Hill, Chor von St. Bonifatius, Wiesbaden and members of the Hessisches Staatsorchester conducted by Johannes Schröder, in a version for small ensemble.

== Recordings ==
- Strauss: Feuersnot., as Ortlieb Tulbeck. Münchner Rundfunkorchester, Ulf Schirmer. CD CPO 2014.
- Rossini: Guillaume Tell, as Arnold. Saarländisches Staatsorchester, Sébastien Rouland. ARTE Concert 2017
- Rossini: Stabat Mater, Bamberger Symphoniker, Alain Altinoglu. BR-Klassik 19 July 2016
- Oskar Gottlieb Blarr: Jesus-Passion, with Gloria Rehm, Silvia Hauer, Johannes Hill, Markus Volpert, Bachorchester Wiesbaden, conducted by Jörg Endebrock. Cybele Records 2018
- Puccini: Messa di Gloria. MDR-Sinfonieorchester and MDR-Rundfunkchor, Domingo Hindoyan. Livestreming from Gewandhaus 2019.
