= John Christian Wiltberger Jr. =

American silversmith (1798–1855)

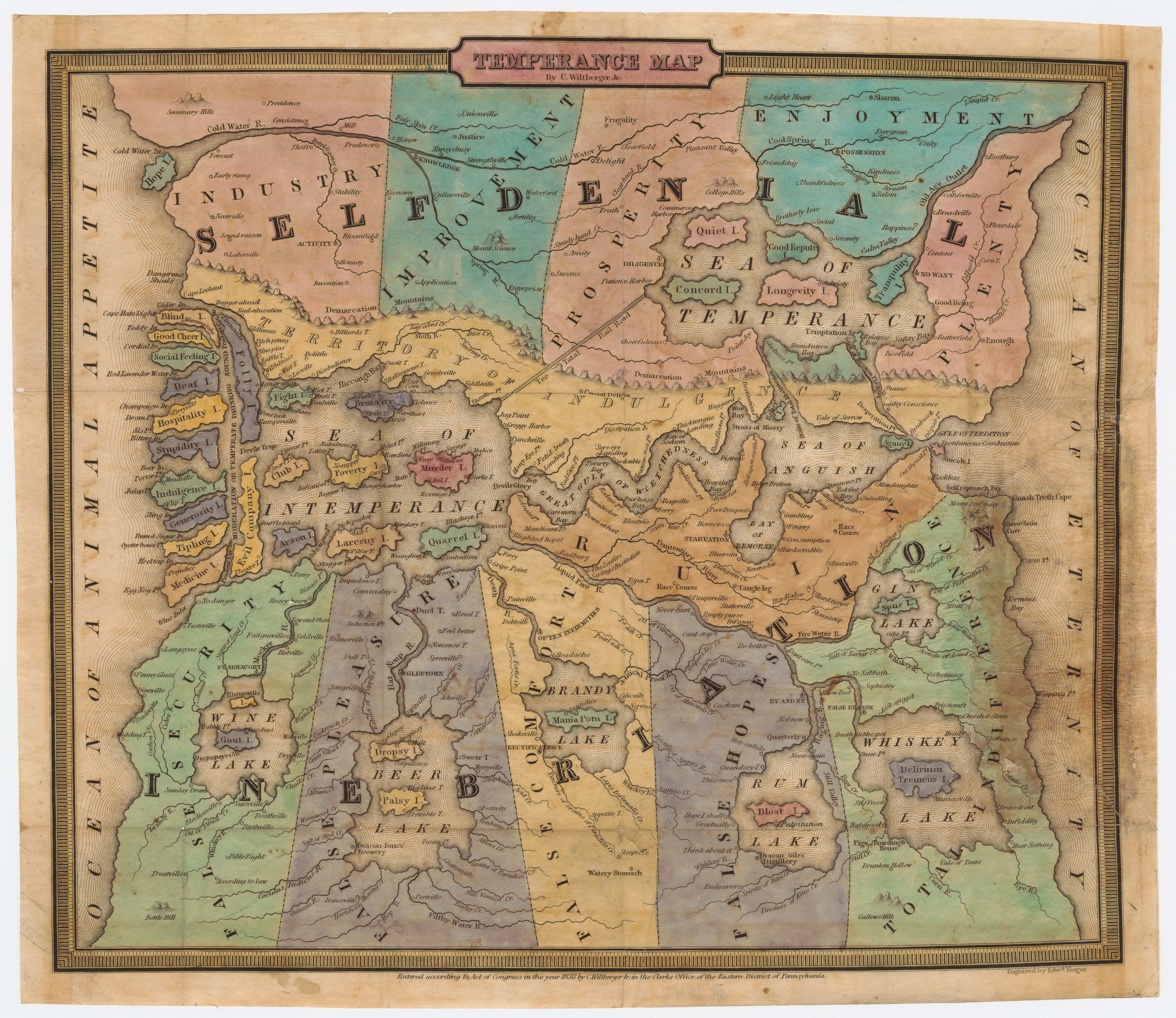
Temperance Map by John Christian Wiltberger Jr., 1838

John Christian Wiltberger Jr. (January 14, 1798 - August 12, 1855) was an American silversmith and religious activist, active in Philadelphia and Bucks County, Pennsylvania.

Wiltberger was born in Philadelphia as a son of silversmith Christian Wiltberger, trained as apprentice under his father, and in 1819 was listed in Philadelphia directories. He did not finish his training, but instead turned to religious activities as a temperance activist, and in 1819 traveled to Liberia to establish a colony for ex-slaves. In 1821 he joined J.B. Winn, Ephraim Bacon, and Joseph R. Andrus aboard the vessel Nautilus on a voyage to carry a group of African Americans to Sierra Leone as part of the American Colonization Society's activities to establish a colony for ex-slaves. He married Maria Louise Powers on February 5, 1823, and became an ordained minister in Washington, DC, in 1831, then returned to Bucks County, Pennsylvania, from 1838 to 1850+ as Rev. Christian Wiltberger, missionary at Yardley, Pennsylvania, and Centreville.
