= Ernst Laaff =

German musician, professor and rector

Ernst Laaff (4 November 1903 – 12 September 1987) was a German musician, professor and rector.

== Life ==
Laaff was born on 4 November 1903 in Wiesbaden. After his school days he first studied in Wiesbaden. Then he went to Frankfurt, Munich and Berlin, where he continued his studies. In Berlin he was taught by Arnold Schering among others. After completing his studies he wrote a dissertation on Franz Schubert's symphonies. [With musical notes.]. Shortly afterwards, the Collegium musicum of the Johannes Gutenberg-Universität Mainz was founded, where he began to teach. In 1938 he became head of the department of the Schott Music publishing house in Mainz. Shortly afterwards he also became representative of the publishing house. In the post-war period, he founded the journal Das Musikleben at the Schott-Verlag.

In 1949 he finally became a professor. At the same time he founded the Hochschule für Musik Mainz and headed it until 1972. He was active as a musician not only in ancient music, demonstrated by original instruments, but also in Neue Musik. During his 24 years as director of the Hochschule für Musik Mainz, he also acted politically in cooperation with local politicians. Here his calm and controlled charisma appeared as a good character trait for his actions. During this time, he also worked as a conductor. In 1972 he finally retired at the age of 69. At the same time he finished his numerous honorary engagements. One year later the Mainz College of Music was integrated into the Johannes Gutenberg University of Mainz.

He fell seriously ill at an advanced age. He finally died after a long illness on 12 September 1987 in Baden-Baden at the age of 83 and was buried at the main cemetery in Baden-Baden.

== Honours ==
- 1963: Peter-Cornelius-Plakette of the State Rhineland-Palatinate
- 1972: Order of Merit of the Federal Republic of Germany (1.Class)

== Work ==
- Walter Gieseking zum Gedächtnis : Ansprache.
- Music mit Fleiss gedrucket. Grundzüge der Entwicklung des Musiknotendrucks. Vortrag, etc..Music mit Fleiss gedrucket. Grundzüge der Entwicklung des Musiknotendrucks. Vortrag, etc. on WorldCat
- Carl Schuricht, 1880-1967 : Ansprache während des Gedächtniskonzertes der Landeshauptstadt Wiesbaden am 28. Februar 1967 im Grossen Kurhaussaal.

== Literature ==
- Wolfgang Balzer: Mainz – Persönlichkeiten der Stadtgeschichte. Volume 2 II: Personen des religiösen Lebens, Personen des politischen Lebens, Personen des allgemein kulturellen Lebens, Wissenschaftler, Literaten, Künstler, Musiker. Druckerei und Verlag Gebr. Kügler, Mainz 1989, ISBN 3-924124-03-9, pp. 196–197.
