= St. Mary's Church, Bad Homburg =

Parish church in Bad Homburg, Germany

Coordinates: 50°13′33.6″N 8°36′49.1″E

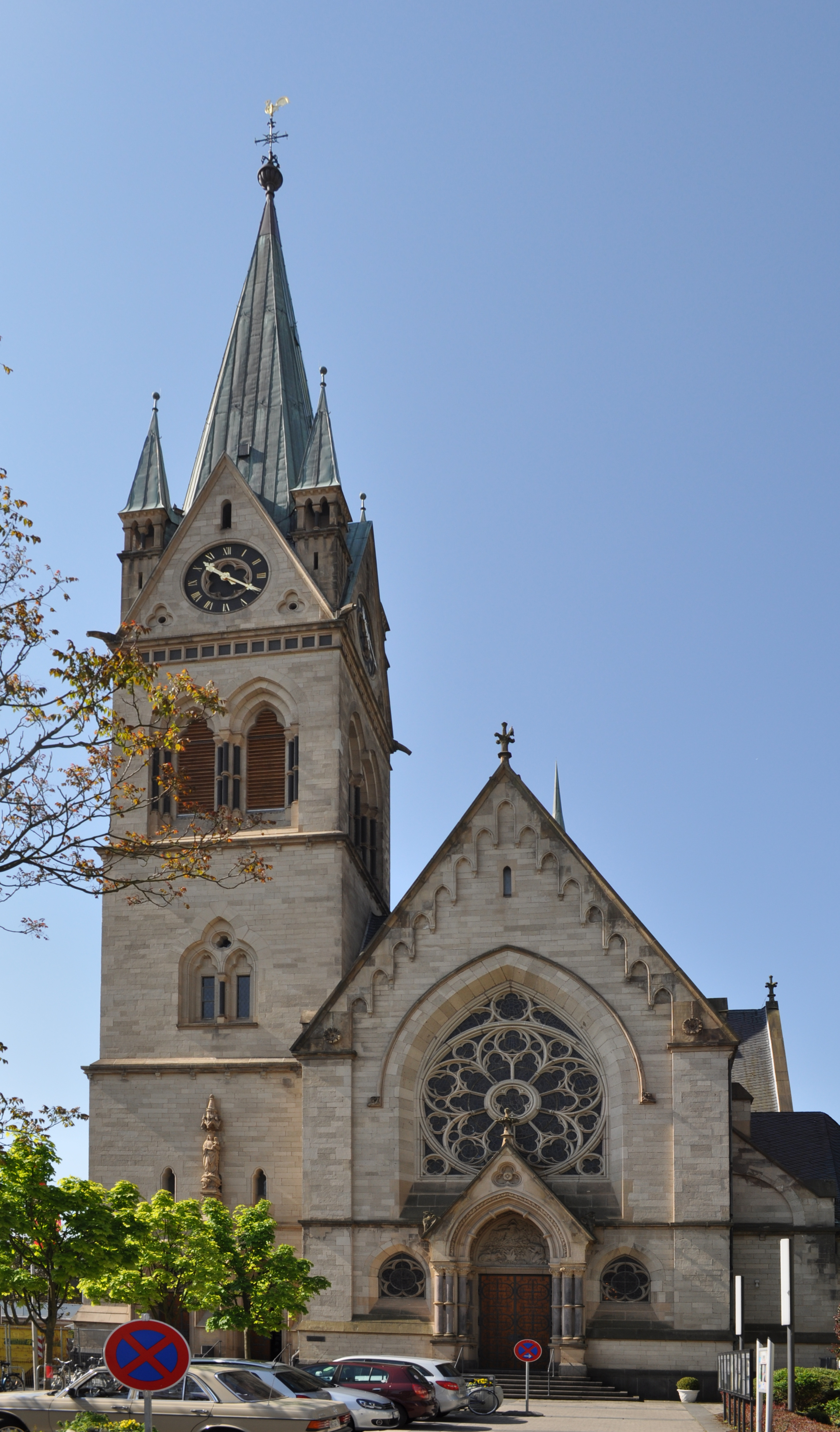
The main facade of the church

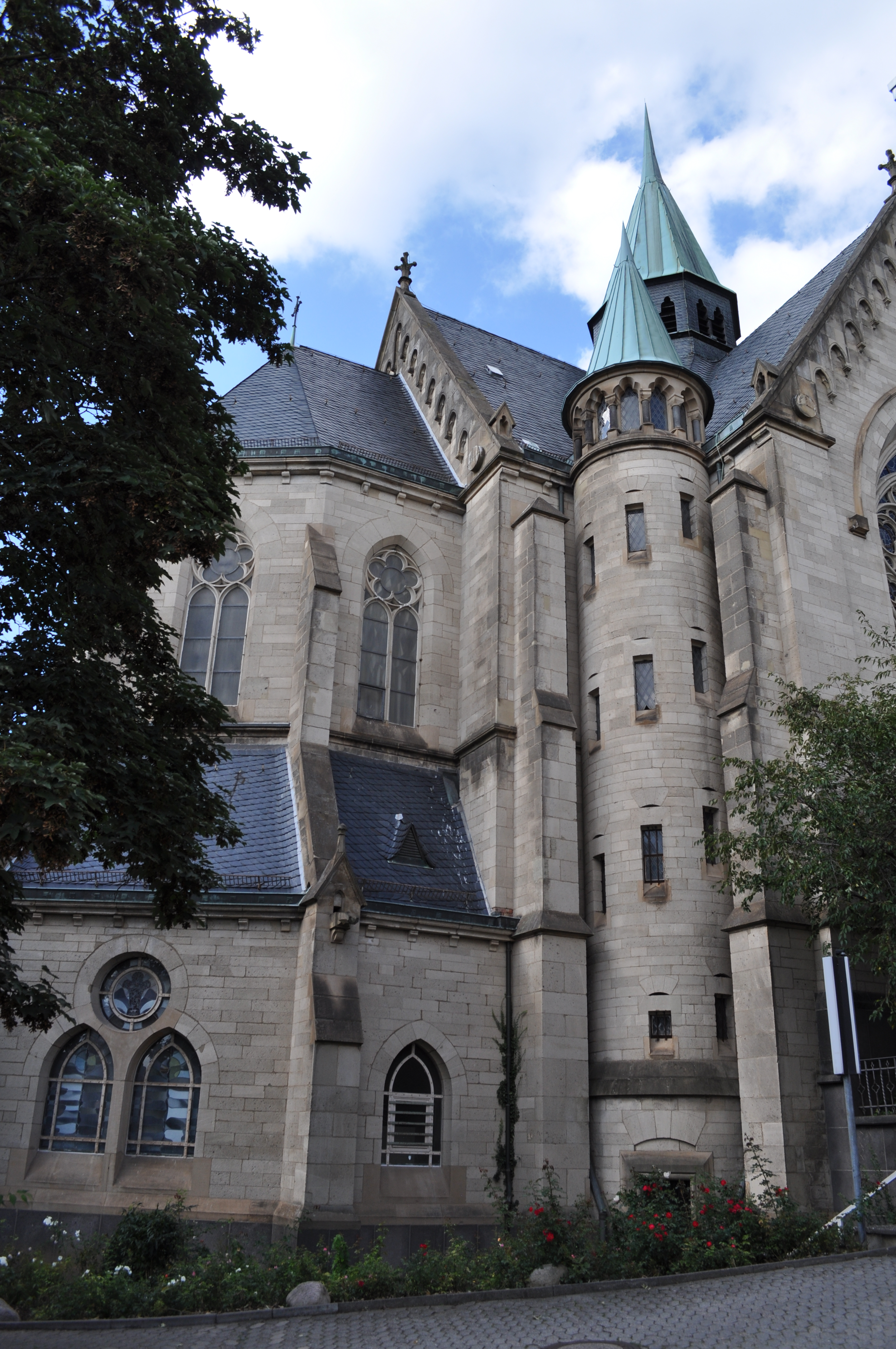
The chorus and crossing

St. Mary's Church (German: Marienkirche) (also St. Marien) is the principal Roman Catholic parish church in Bad Homburg, Hesse, Germany. It lies within Hochtaunus church district, and like many other houses on Dorotheenstrasse, it is under monument protection.

== History ==
Homburg has been a Protestant town since the Reformation in 1527. It was not until the end of the 18th century that a small Catholic community was formed, which in 1820 only had 215 members. Since 1812, Catholic services have been held again.

In 1866 the male line of the Landgrafen family died out and Hesse-Homburg fell to Prussia. The Prussian government sought to incorporate the parishes into the Diocese of Limburg in order to prevent "foreign" influences. Bishop Ketteler successfully resisted, and after his death in 1877, the Homburg situation became a political issue. The Prussian government made another attempt at integration, which the papal curia also agreed to and commissioned the Bishop of Trier Michael Felix Korum to implement it. At the time, the Limburg bishop Peter Joseph Blum was in exile in Bohemia because he had come into conflict with the Prussian government due to the May Laws. Karl Klein, who had been commissioned by Blum to lead the diocese, convinced Korum to use the Roman integration decree as a means of pressure against the government. He agreed to the compromise. Blum was pardoned on December 3, 1883, and was able to return to Limburg and Homburg was incorporated into the Diocese of Limburg on February 24, 1884.

The Catholic community in Homburg grew strongly during this time. In 1866, 1,350 of Homburg's 7,400 residents professed the Catholic faith. In 1869, Bishop Ketteler made Homburg its own parish. The growing community resulted in the desire for a larger church. In 1863 a building site was acquired. These were the properties at Dorotheenstrasse 15 and 17. However, due to the Kulturkampf, construction could only begin 20 years later under the Mainz Cathedral builder, Ludwig Becker. He used the plans he originally created for St. Josef in Krefeld. In 1892 the foundation stone was laid. The inauguration took place in the presence of Queen Victoria of Great Britain on August 14, 1895. In 1915, the Marienkirche became the seat of the newly founded deanery of Homburg vor der Höhe.

In 1981 the parish celebrated the Feast of the Cross together with the Kirdorfer community.

== Pastors ==
The parish priests of Kirdorf were responsible for Bad Homburg until 1869:

- Johann Jakob Reusch (1816–1838)
- Jakob Eder (1838–1843)
- Christian Huether (1843–1862)
- Friedrich Werner, parish administrator (1862–1864)
- Heinrich Philipp Werner (1864–1869)

The independent parish of Bad Homburg existed from 1869:

- Alexander Menzel (1870–1914)
- Heinrich Fendel (1914–1916)
- Johannes Herr (1916–1918)
- Wilhelm Burggraf (1918–1958)
- Hans Willig (1971–1991)
- Werner Meuer (since 2003)
