= Westerwälder Dom =

Coordinates: 50°28′22″N 7°48′04″E

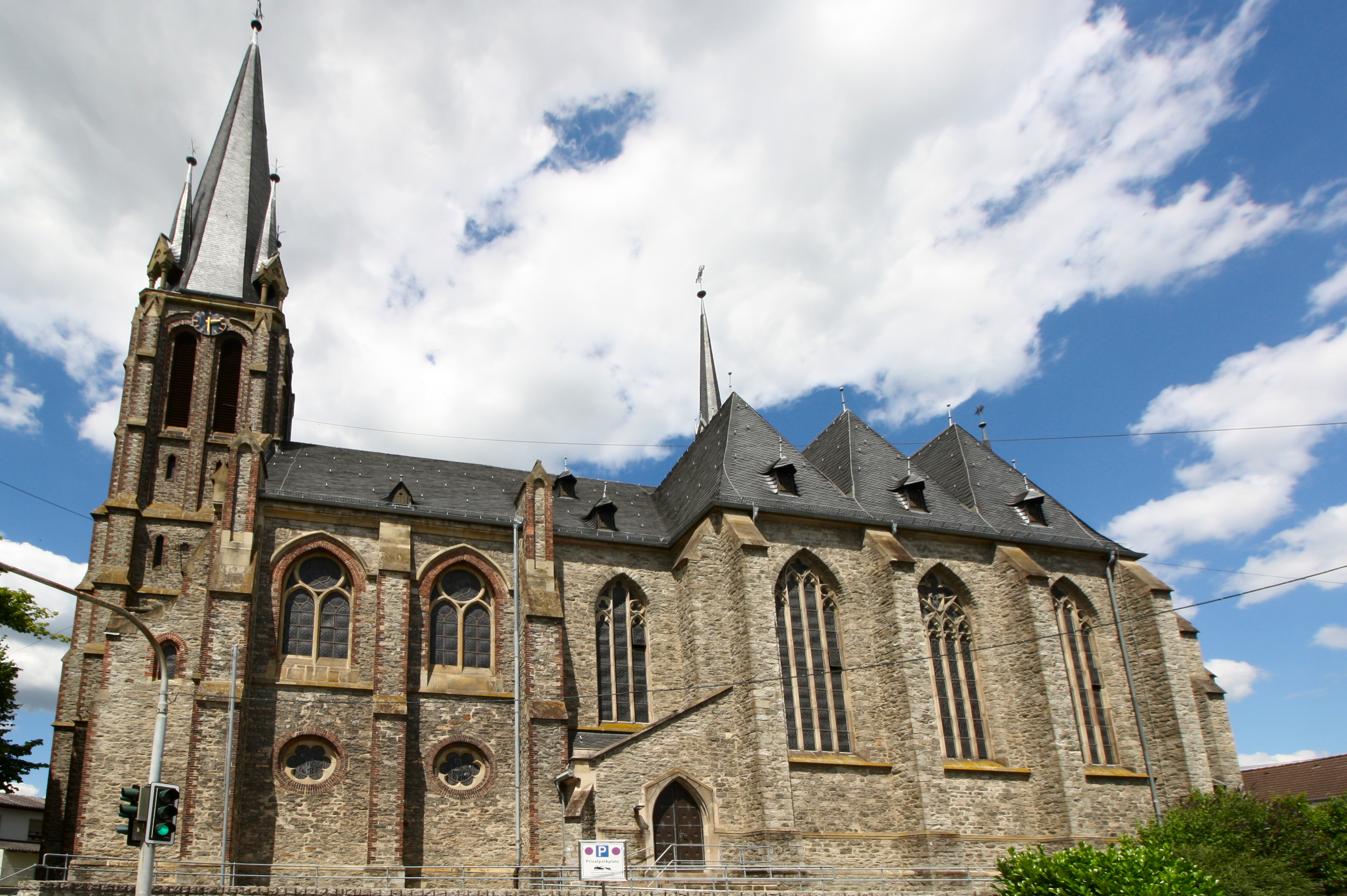
- Westerwälder Dom St. Bonifatius

- Location: Wirges, Rhineland-Palatine
- Country: Germany
- Denomination: Catholic
- Website: st-bonifatius-wirges.bistumlimburg.de

History
- Status: Parish church
- Dedication: St. Boniface
- Consecrated: 1887

Architecture
- Functional status: Active
- Architect: Max Meckel

Administration
- Province: Cologne
- Diocese: Limburg

Westerwälder Dom is the common name of the church St. Bonifatius in Wirges in the Westerwald region, Germany. It was built in Gothic revival style from 1885 to 1887. It has been called Westerwälder Dom from 1902.

== History ==
The church is the third church building in Wirges, all dedicated to St. Boniface. The congregation outgrew every former building. When a new building was planned, alternatives were to build it on the graveyard, expanding the old church, or to build a new church on a larger property in the west of town. In 1878, when the bishop of Limburg was banned, the Kirchenvorstand commissioned an expansion of the church without waiting for consent from the diocese, and works for started, intending to use the expansion as a first stage for a rebuilding. The tower was demolished as unsafe, against protests from the population who wanted to protect it as an "unersetzliches Kunstwerk" (irreplaceable work of art).

In 1883, Baumeister Büchling was requested to supply plans for a completely new building. After the Limburg office was working again, they commissioned architect Max Meckel from Frankfurt to supply an alternative design for a Gothic revival church with three naves. The old church was demolished, leaving only the columns of the central nave. The new church was connected to the expansion building and the new tower. It was consecrated on 20 August 1887 by Bishop Karl Klein, who promoted Meckel to cathedral builder (Diözesanbaumeister) at the same time.

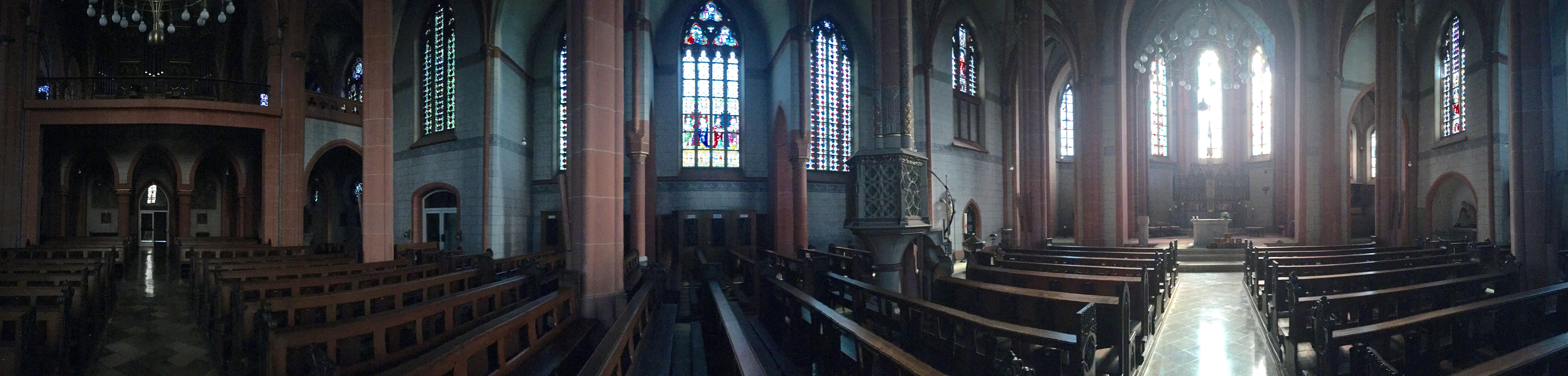
Panorama of the interior

== Literature ==
- Kath. Kirchengemeinde St. Bonifatius Wirges: Festbuch anlässlich der 100-Jahrfeier der Pfarrkirche St. Bonifatius Wirges. Wirges, 1987.
- Kath. Kirchengemeinde St. Bonifatius Wirges: St. Bonifatius Wirges. Wirges, 1989.
