= Johann Rosenmüller =

German Baroque composer (1619–1684)

- Born: 1619; Oelsnitz, Saxony
- Died: September 10, 1684; Wolfenbüttel
- Education: University of Leipzig
- Occupations: Organist; Composer
- Organizations: Nikolaikirche Leipzig; St Mark's Basilica, Venice

Johann Rosenmüller (1619 – 10 September 1684) was a German Baroque composer, who played a part in transmitting Italian musical styles to the north.

== Career ==
Rosenmüller was born in Oelsnitz, near Plauen in Saxony. He studied at the University of Leipzig, graduating in 1640. He served as organist of the Nikolaikirche Leipzig from 1651, and had been assured of advancement to cantor. He became director of music in absentia to the Altenburg court in 1654.

In 1655 he was accused of homosexual activities with choirboys. To avoid prison, he fled to Italy and, by 1658, was employed at St Mark's Basilica in Venice. He composed many vocal works while teaching at an orphanage for girls (Ospedale della Pietà), between 1678 and 1682. The works of Giovanni Legrenzi were among his Italian influences and his sacred compositions show the influence of Heinrich Schütz.

In his last years, Rosenmüller returned to Germany with Duke Anton-Ulrich of Brunswick-Wolfenbüttel, at whose court he served as choir master. He died in Wolfenbüttel on 10 September 1684, and is buried there.

== Works ==
Kern-Sprüche mehrentheils aus heiliger Schrifft Altes und Neues Testaments (Core sentences, mostly from holy scriptures Old and New Testament), Leipzig (1648)

- Aeterne Deus, clementissime Pater, 1v, 2 str, bc
- Christum lieb haben, 3vv, 2 str, bc
- Coeli enarrant gloriam Dei, 3vv, 2 str, bc
- Danket dem Herren und prediget, 2vv, 2 str, bc
- Danksaget dem Vater, 5vv, 2 str, bc
- Daran ist erschienen die Liebe Gottes, 5vv, 2 str, bc
- Das ist das ewige Leben, 3vv, bc
- Das ist ein köstlich Ding, 2vv, 5 str, bc
- Die Augen des Herren, 4vv, 2 str, bc
- Ein Tag in deinen Vorhöfen, 3vv, 2 str, bc
- Habe deine Lust an dem Herren, 1v, 5 str, bc
- Hebet eure Augen auf gen Himmel, 2vv, 2 str, bc
- In te Domine speravi, 4vv, 2 str, bc
- Lieber Herr Gott, 1v, 3 str/brass, bc
- Mater Jerusalem, civitas sancta Dei, 2vv, 2 str, bc
- Meine Seele harret nur auf Gott, 3vv, 2 str, bc
- O admirabile commercium, 2vv, 4 str/brass, bc
- O Domine Jesu Christe, adoro te, 3vv, bc
- O nomen Jesu, nomen dulce, 4vv, bc
- Treiffet ihr Himmel von oben, 1v, 2 str, bc

Andere Kern-Sprüche (Other core sentences), Leipzig (1652–1653)

- Also hat Gott die Welt geliebet, 5vv, 5 str/brass, bc;
- Amo te Deus meus amore magno, 2vv, 4 str/brass, bc;
- Christum ducem, qui per crucem, 1v, 2 str, bc;
- Das ist meine Freude, 1v, 2 str, bc;
- Der Name des Herren, 5vv, 2 str, bc;
- Die Gnade unseres Herren Jesu Christi, 4vv, bc;
- Domine Deus meus, 2vv, 2 str, bc;
- Herr mein Gott, ich danke dir, 3vv, 2 str, bc;
- Herr, wenn ich nur dich habe, 1v, 5 str, bc;
- Ich bin das Brod des Lebens, 3vv, 2 str, bc;
- Ich hielte mich nicht dafür, 4vv, bc;
- Ist Gott für uns, 1v, 5 str, bc;
- Kündlich gross ist das gottselige Geheimnis, 3vv, bc;
- O dives omnium bonarum dapum, 1v, 3 str/brass, bc;
- O dulcis Christe, bone Jesu charitas, 2vv, 3 str/brass, bc;
- Siehe an die Wercke Gottes, 5vv, 5 str/brass, bc;
- Siehe des Herren Auge, 3vv, 2 str, bc;
- Vulnera Jesu Christi, 1v, 2 str, bc;
- Wahrlich, wahrlich ich sage euch, 4vv, 2 str, bc;
- Weil wir wissen, dass der Mensch, 3vv, 2 str, bc

== Recordings ==
- Sinfonias No. 1, 2, 4 Jordi Savall Astree
- Vespers (2CD) Cantus Cölln Konrad Junghänel 1996 HMC
- Weihnachtshistorie Cantus Cölln Junghänel HMC
- Sacri Concerti Cantus Cölln Junghänel 1994 DHM
- Deutsche Geistliche Konzerte: Siehe an die Werke Gottes. Entsetze dich Natur. Arno Paduch 2000 Christophorus Records
- Instrumental & Vocal works. The King's Noyse. HMU
- Requiem (2CD) Musica Fiata Roland Wilson. Sony
- Lamentations. Ingrid Schmidthüsen Parnassi Musici CPO 1999
- Lamentations. Fritz Wünderlich (SWR)(SWR recordings 1956–58)
- Dixit Dominus; Lauda Sion; Nisi Dominus; Magnificat. La Soranza, Trinity Baroque, Wiesbadener Knabenchor, Arno Paduch Amati 1996
- Jube Domine; In te Domine speravi; Qui habitat in adjutorio; Ecce nunc benedicite; Exurge gloria mea; Nunc dimittis; Salve regina. Paduch Christophorus 2009
- Beatus Vir; Jubilate Deo; Misericordias Domini; Coelestes Spiritus; Nisi Dominus;Salve mi Jesu Sonatas Raquel Andueza, Wolf Matthias Friedrich, Gli Incogniti, Amandine Beyer. Zig-Zag
- Lo Zuane Tedeso Estote fortes in bello; Surgamus ad laudes; O dives omnium bonarum; Ego te laudo; In te Domine speravi; Laudate pueri Dominum; Salve Regina I fedeli PAN
- Vox Dilecti Mei O Salvator dilectissime; Christum ducem qui per crucem; In te Domine speravi; O dives omnium bonarum; Vox dilecti mei; O anima mea suspira ardenter Sonatas Alex Potter, Chelycus Ensemble Ramee
