= Talia Or =

Israeli-born operatic soprano based in Germany

- טליה אור
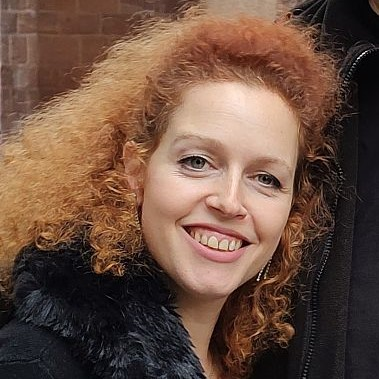
- Talia Or in 2022
- Born: Jerusalem, Israel
- Education: Musikhochschule Hamburg
- Occupations: Operatic soprano; Academic teacher
- Organizations: Staatstheater am Gärtnerplatz; Musikhochschule München
- Website: www.talia-or.com

Talia Or (Hebrew: טליה אור) is an Israeli-born operatic and concert soprano based in Germany. Her repertoire ranges from concert and lied to contemporary music. She is a lecturer on singing at Musikhochschule München.

== Early life and education ==
Born in Jerusalem, Or grew up in Germany from age four, when her family moved to Aachen. Her father was a teacher at the synagogue, and her mother a singer in the opera chorus. She appeared on the stage of Stadttheater Aachen at the age of ten. She studied at the Musikhochschule Hamburg.

== Career ==
While still a student Or made her debut at Hamburg State Opera as Taumännchen in Humperdinck's Hänsel und Gretel and Papagena in Mozart's Zauberflöte. As a member of the opera studio of La Monnaie in Brussels, she appeared in 2002 as Cherubino in Mozart's Le nozze di Figaro. In Munich she was part of Junges Ensemble of the Bavarian State Opera, and ensemble member at Staatstheater am Gärtnerplatz from 2004 to 2008, singing Pamina in Die Zauberflöte, Gretel in Hänsel und Gretel and Rosina in Rossini's Il Barbiere di Siviglia, among others. Internationally she performed as a guest in Turin, Valencia, Sao Paulo and Tokyo. Her repertoire further includes Marzelline in Beethoven's Fidelio, Rosalinde in Die Fledermaus by Johann Strauss, and Tatjana in Tchaikovsky's Eugene Onegin.

In 2010 she appeared as Lisa in Weinberg's Das Portrait at Bregenzer Festspiele, the opera's Western European premiere. In 2012 she performed as the Voice of a Falcon in Die Frau ohne Schatten by Richard Strauss at La Scala in Milan, directed by Claus Guth and conducted by Semyon Bychkov. She sang at operklosterneuburg opera festival in 2013, portraying Frau Fluth in Nicolai's Die lustigen Weiber von Windsor. Reviewer Lena Dražic of the Wiener Zeitung noted:

The incessantly scheming Frau Fluth, as embodied by Talia Or, not only holds all the strings in terms of content, but with her noble soprano is also vocally the undisputed ruler of the scenery. (Die unablässig Ränke schmiedende Frau Fluth hält in der Verkörperung durch Talia Or nicht nur inhaltlich alle Fäden in der Hand, sondern ist mit ihrem edlen Sopran auch stimmlich unangefochtene Herrscherin über die Szenerie.)

In concert she performed Mahler's Symphony No. 2 with the Israel Philharmonic Orchestra conducted by Zubin Mehta, Mozart's Great Mass in C minor conducted by Andris Nelsons, and Bach's Christmas Oratorio conducted by Peter Schreier for the Maggio Musicale Fiorentino. On 3 May 2009 Or took part in the world premiere of Paweł Łukaszewski's Miserere for soprano, mixed chorus and orchestra at the Gaude Mater International Festival of Sacred Music in Częstochowa, with the Polish Chamber Choir and the Morphing Vienna Chamber Orchestra, conducted by Michał Dworzyński. On 4 June 2016 she was the soprano soloist in three works with five choirs at the choral festival in Lüneburg, singing Poulenc's Gloria, the Requiem "Schwarz vor Augen und es ward Licht" by Harald Weiss, and Bernstein's Symphony No. 3 "Kaddish". On 3 October 2022 she was the soprano soloist in Verdi's Requiem at St. Bonifatius, Wiesbaden, in a version for small ensemble, with Silvia Hauer, Sung Min Song, Johannes Hill and members of Hessisches Staatsorchester conducted by Johannes Schröder.

In 2008 Or recorded the soprano solo for Bach's cantata Wachet auf, ruft uns die Stimme, BWV 140, with the Israel Philharmonic Orchestra conducted by Mehta in a live performance at the Jerusalem Theatre of the ICC International Center in Jerusalem. In 2010 she recorded Weinberg's Three Palms, a setting of Lermontov's Three Palms for soprano and string quartet, Op. 120. A reviewer noted her "heartfelt passion". She recorded two works by Simon Mayr, the dramatic cantata L'Armonia and the Cantata for the Death of Beethoven, with the Simon Mayr Choir and the Ingolstadt Georgian Chamber Orchestra, conducted by Franz Hauk.

== Other work ==
Or is a lecturer of singing at the Musikhochschule München.
