= Karl Klein (bishop) =

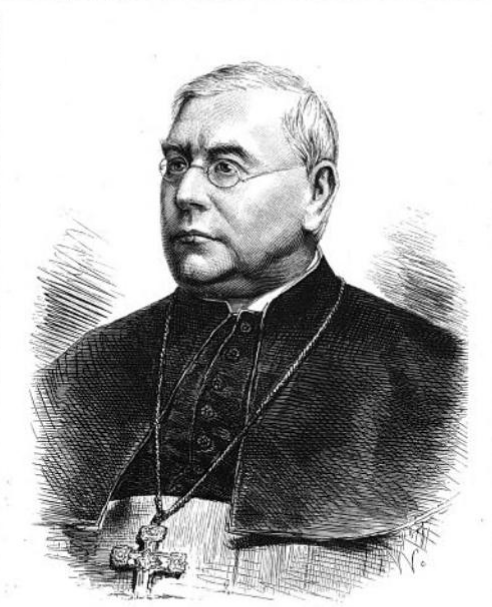
Bishop Karl Klein

Arms of Bishop Karl Klein of Limburg

Karl Klein (11 January 1819 – 6 February 1898) was the Catholic Bishop of Limburg from 1886 to 1898. He restored the church after the Kulturkampf and won orders to found or reestablish monasteries in the diocese.

== Life and career ==
Klein was born in Frankfurt on 11 January 1819. He received an extensive academic education in theology Regensburg, Freiburg and Munich. He was ordained a priest on 4 November 1841. In 1843, he became secretary to Bishop Peter Joseph Blum, who was only ten years his senior.

In 1867, Klein entered the Prussian House of Representatives as a member of the Centre Party for the Lower Westerwald district.

In 1876, Bishop Blum was no longer accepted by the Prussian government; threatened by disciplinary actions, he fled to Bohemia. Klein, then dean at the cathedral, became commissionary for his functions. Blum was pardoned and returned to Limburg in 1883.

In 1886, Klein was appointed Bishop of Limburg by Pope Leo XIII as the successor to Christian Roos. He was consecrated on 4 November 1886 by the former Archbishop of Cologne, Cardinal Paul Melchers. Klein had been favoured by the Prussian government over a candidate with political intentions, while Klein pursued no politics among the clergy, and was in this respect isolated among German bishops at the time. Together with Bishop Georg von Kopp of Fulda, Klein was the only German bishop who clearly spoke out in favour of the papal line and thus against the rejection of the Septennate by the Centre Party. Internally, he endeavoured above all to restore the ecclesiastical structures that had suffered under the Kulturkampf. During his tenure, several orders founded or reestablished monasteries in the diocese, including the Cistercians, Pallottines and Ursulines.

Klein consecrated many new church buildings personally. On 8 October 1888 he dedicated the first Catholic church of Idstein to Mary Magdalene. He consecrated St. Marien in Bad Homburg, a new church in Gothic revival style and St. Josef in Frankfurt-Bornheim, both in 1895. In 1897, he consecrated St. Matthias in Langendernbach. Consecrating Mariä Himmelfahrt in Frankfurt-Griesheim in 1898 was one of the last functions he performed as bishop.

Klein died in Limburg on 6 February 1898, at age 79.
