= Christian Wiltberger =

American silversmith

- Born: November 10, 1769
- Died: October 16, 1851 (aged 81)

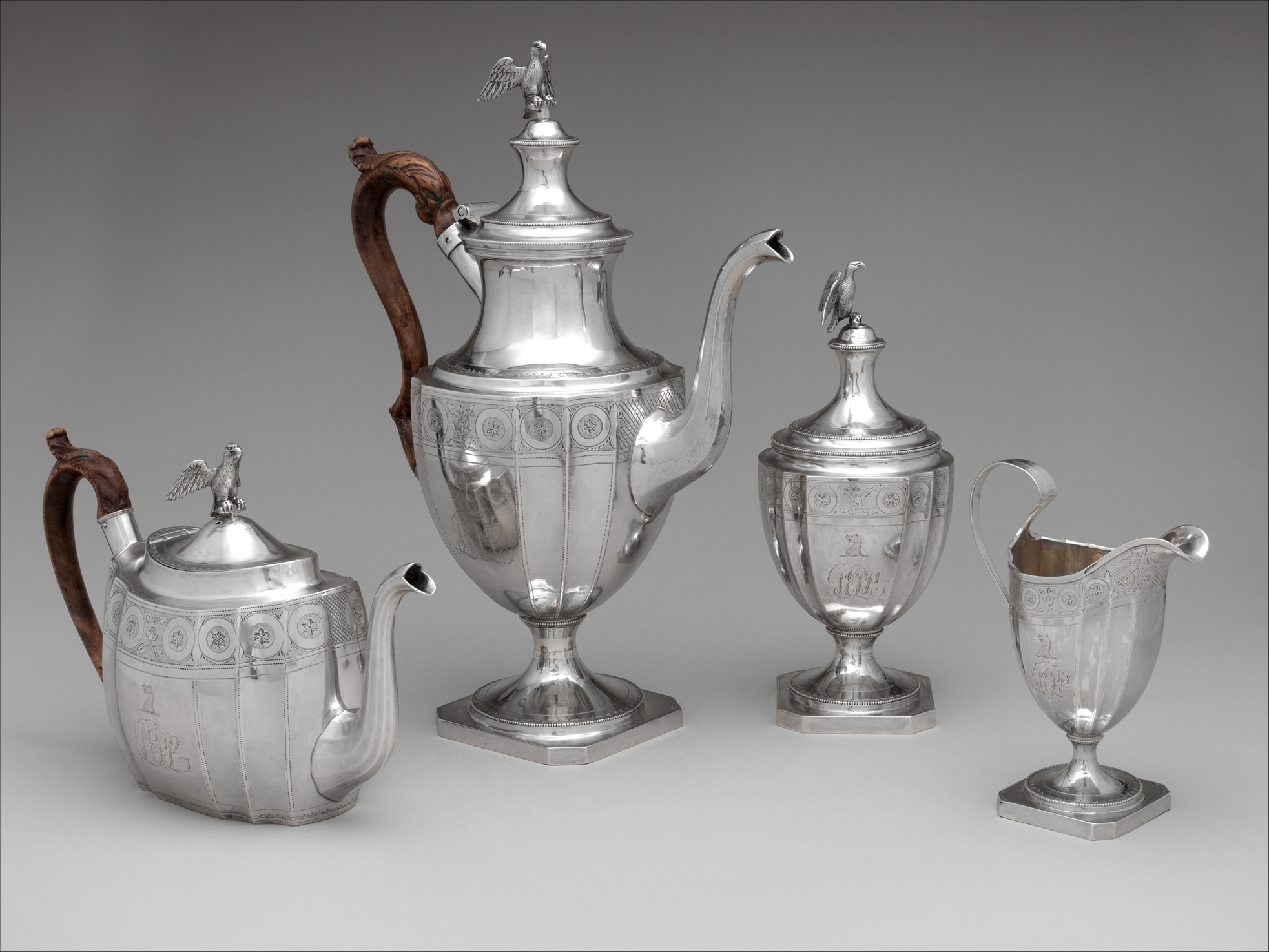
Coffee and tea set by Christian Wiltberger, circa 1800

John Christian Wiltberger Sr. (November 10, 1769 – October 16, 1851) was an American silversmith, active in Philadelphia.

Wiltberger was born in Philadelphia, where he apprenticed about 1782 to Richard Humphreys. There he married Ann Warner on March 26, 1791, with whom he had 8 children (including John Christian Wiltberger Jr.), and worked from 1793-1797 as a silversmith and jeweler. For some time he partnered with Samuel Alexander as WILTBERGER & ALEXANDER, but as the following advertisements in the Federal Gazette indicate, that partnership was dissolved in June 1797:

WILTBERGER & ALEXANDER, Silversmiths and Jewellers, Have this day dissolved their partnership by mutual consent. As Mr. Wiltberger has authorised himself to settle the business without my knowledge, I therefore think it my duty to inform my friends and the public, that I am neither dead, insolvent, or run away, but that I have lately removed to the house formerly occupied by Mr. Wiltberger, in south Second street, No. 33, where I mean to carry on the business in all its branches, on the most reasonable terms. [June 5, 1797].

CHRISTIAN WILTBERGER, Informs his friends and the public, that he has removed from No. 33, south Second street, to No. 13, north Second, nearly opposite Christ Church, where he carries on the Silversmith's and jeweller's business in all its branches, as usual. He has also on hand a large and elegant assortment of Silver plated Wares, Jewellery, &c. imported by the latest arrivals from Europe, together with a considerable quantity of Silver Wares, manufactured immediately under his own inspection, which he means to sell on the most reasonable terms. N. B. The highest price given for old Gold and silver. [June 7, 1797].

Wiltberger then continued to work as a silversmith from 1797-1819. Rembrandt Peale painted his portrait in 1818. His work is collected in the Metropolitan Museum of Art, Museum of Fine Arts, Boston, Philadelphia Museum of Art, Winterthur Museum, and Yale University Art Gallery.
