= Wiesbadener Knabenchor =

Mixed boys' choir

- Choir
- Origin: Wiesbaden, Hesse, Germany
- Founded: 1960
- Genre: Mostly sacred music
- Members: 80
- Chief conductor: Roman Twardy
- Choir admission: Boys and young men (SATB)
- Awards: Kulturpreis Wiesbaden
- Website: Official website

The Wiesbadener Knabenchor is a mixed boys' choir founded in 1960 in Wiesbaden, the capital of Hesse, Germany. First a parish choir at the Ringkirche, it developed into a concert choir which has appeared internationally in countries such as Bulgaria, Malaysia and Australia, and has made recordings.

== History ==
The pastor at the Ringkirche in Wiesbaden, Hugo Herrfurth, founded a boys' choir with boys' and men's voices in 1960, based on the long traditions of boys' choirs in Germany. It developed into a concert choir of approximately 70 voices aged 6 to 35, which has been conducted by Roman Twardy since 2001. They perform in services in Wiesbaden churches, and in concert both at home and on tour. The choir has been a member of the Verband Deutscher Konzertchöre (Association of German concert choirs) since 1998. In 2002, the choir became a member of the European Federation of Choirs in Brussels.

The Wiesbadener Knabenchor performs a broad repertoire, from a cappella folk songs to contemporary music, with a focus on Baroque music such as the oratorios by Johann Sebastian Bach and the works of Johann Rosenmüller. The choir has participated in concerts with artists such as Montserrat Caballé and orchestras such as the Brandenburgische Philharmonie Potsdam. It has appeared on radio and television for Hessischer Rundfunk and made several recordings. The choir has toured in several European countries, including Austria, Belgium, Denmark, Lithuania, Luxembourg, the Netherlands, Poland and Slovakia. On an invitation from the Goethe-Institut in 1997, the choir toured in Malaysia and Australia. In 2003, the choir performed Bach's St John Passion in Switzerland and France, including the festival Printemps Baroque. In 2004, the Wiesbadener Knabenchor was the first German boys' choir to perform in Bulgaria after the end of socialism, singing in Sofia, Plovdiv, Blagoevgrad, Dupnitsa and Sandanski. The choir maintains contact with other boys' and youth choirs, for example singing Bach's Christmas Oratorio jointly with the Varpelis choir from Kaunas, Lithuania. The choir has a tradition of concerts during Advent and Christmas, singing regularly at St. Bonifatius, Wiesbaden.

In 2013, the Wiesbadener Knabenchor was awarded the Kulturpreis der Landeshauptstadt Wiesbaden, the culture prize of Wiesbaden. The jury wrote that the choir has enriched the cultural life of the city for more than fifty years, with constantly high artistic quality ("Seit über 50 Jahren bereichert der Wiesbadener Knabenchor bei konstant hoher künstlerischer Qualität die Musiklandschaft und das kulturelle Leben unserer Stadt"), and that it has been an ambassador of the capital ("Botschafter der Landeshauptstadt") and worked in exchange with youth choirs in other countries.

== Recordings ==
Year	Title	Composer	Conductor	Soloists / orchestra	Notes
1980	Krönungsmesse	Vincenzo Righini	Konrad-Jürgen Kleinicke	Annedore Reichwein-Hahn, Rose-Marie Stoye, Axel Reichardt, Friedmann Seiler / members of the Hessisches Staatstheater Wiesbaden	
1983	Te Deum / Requiem	Vincenzo Righini	Konrad-Jürgen Kleinicke	Eva Schmidt, Rose-Marie Stoye, Uwe Heilmann, Friedmann Seiler / members of the Hessischen Staatstheater Wiesbaden	
1989	Die Geburt Christi	Heinrich von Herzogenberg	Konrad-Jürgen Kleinicke	Eva Schmidt, Olga Sandu, Gerd Rixmann, Axel Wagner, Leopoldinum	
1991	Da haben die Dornen Rosen getragen		Klaus Ullrich		
1994	Die Freude ist nah		Klaus Ullrich		
1997	Vesper Psalms / Magnificat	Johann Rosenmüller	Klaus Ullrich	La Soranza, Trinity Baroque	live
2007	Das Lied des Lammes (Passion oratorio)	Johann Mattheson	Roman Twardy	Nicole Taburro, Marc Dostert, Florian Rosskopp, Stefan Grunwald / Musica Mattiaca	live
2009	So singen wir!		Roman Twardy		
