= August Wiltberger =

- Born: 17 April 1850; Sobernheim, Rhine Province, Prussia, German Empire
- Died: 2 December 1928 (aged 78); Lessenich/Meßdorf, Rhine Province, Prussia, Weimar Republic
- Occupations: Music director; Composer; Academic teacher
- Spouse: Theresa née Grünewald

August Wiltberger (17 April 1850 – 2 December 1928) was a German royal music director, composer and professor at a teachers' seminary.

== Career ==
Wiltberger was born in Sobernheim. He received his first lessons from his father, who was organist and teacher. From 1868 to 1871 he attended the seminary in Boppard, where the music pedagogue Peter Piel was his role model. From 1871 to 1873 he worked as a teacher in Bad Salzig. In 1873, he followed the calling as a music teacher at the Präparandenanstalt (preparatory school) in Colmar, from 1876 at the Gymnasium and at the Höhere Töchterschule, a school for girls, in Saargemünd. In 1880, he went to the newly established seminary in Münstermaifeld. From 1888, he worked until his retirement at the seminary in Brühl. Wiltberger was married to Theresa Wiltberger, née Grünewald.

Since 1879, he was a presenter of the Allgemeiner Cäcilien-Verband für Deutschland, a Catholic organisation for choral singing. He actively supported the training of teachers, students and organist. His own compositions were almost exclusively written for amateur choirs, similar to those of Michael Haller, Peter Griesbach, Immanuel Faisst, Vinzenz Goller. His works were mostly published by Schwann in Düsseldorf. Shortly before his death, he became an honorary citizen of Bad Sobernheim. He died in Lessenich/Meßdorf, now part of Bonn.

== Literature ==
- Hans Gappenach: August Wiltberger (in series Rheinische Musiker, ed. Karl Gustav Fellerer, Cologne, 1966)
