= Dixit Maria =

- Motet by Hans Leo Hassler
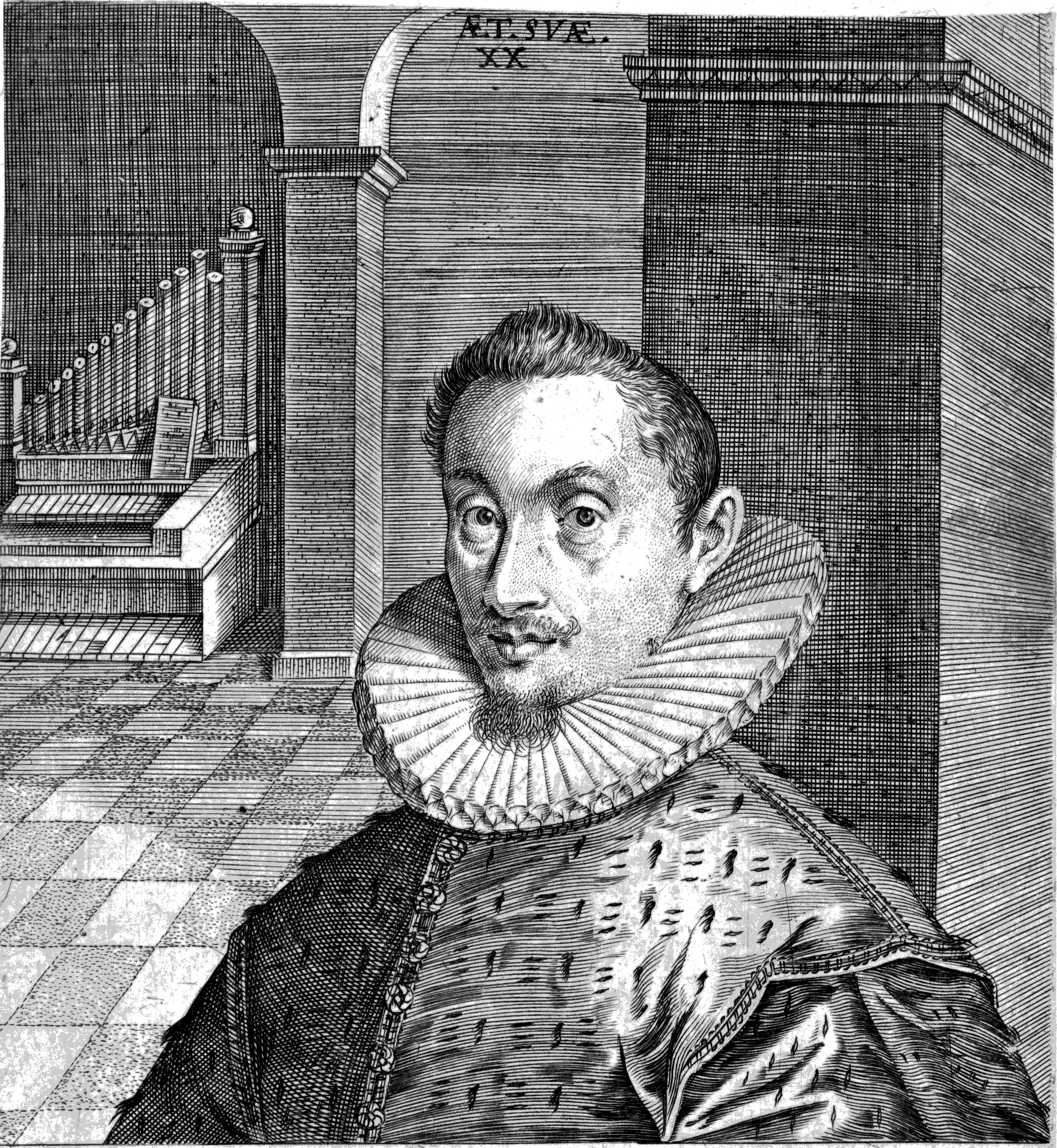
- The composer in 1593
- Related: Missa super Dixit Maria
- Occasion: Annunciation
- Text: Book of Luke 1:38
- Language: Latin
- Published: 1591:
- Scoring: SATB choir

Dixit Maria (Mary said [to the angel]) is a motet for four voices by Hans Leo Hassler. It is part of his collection Cantiones sacrae published in 1591. It sets a verse from the narration of the annunciation in Latin. Hassler based a mass on the motet, Missa super Dixit Maria.

== History ==
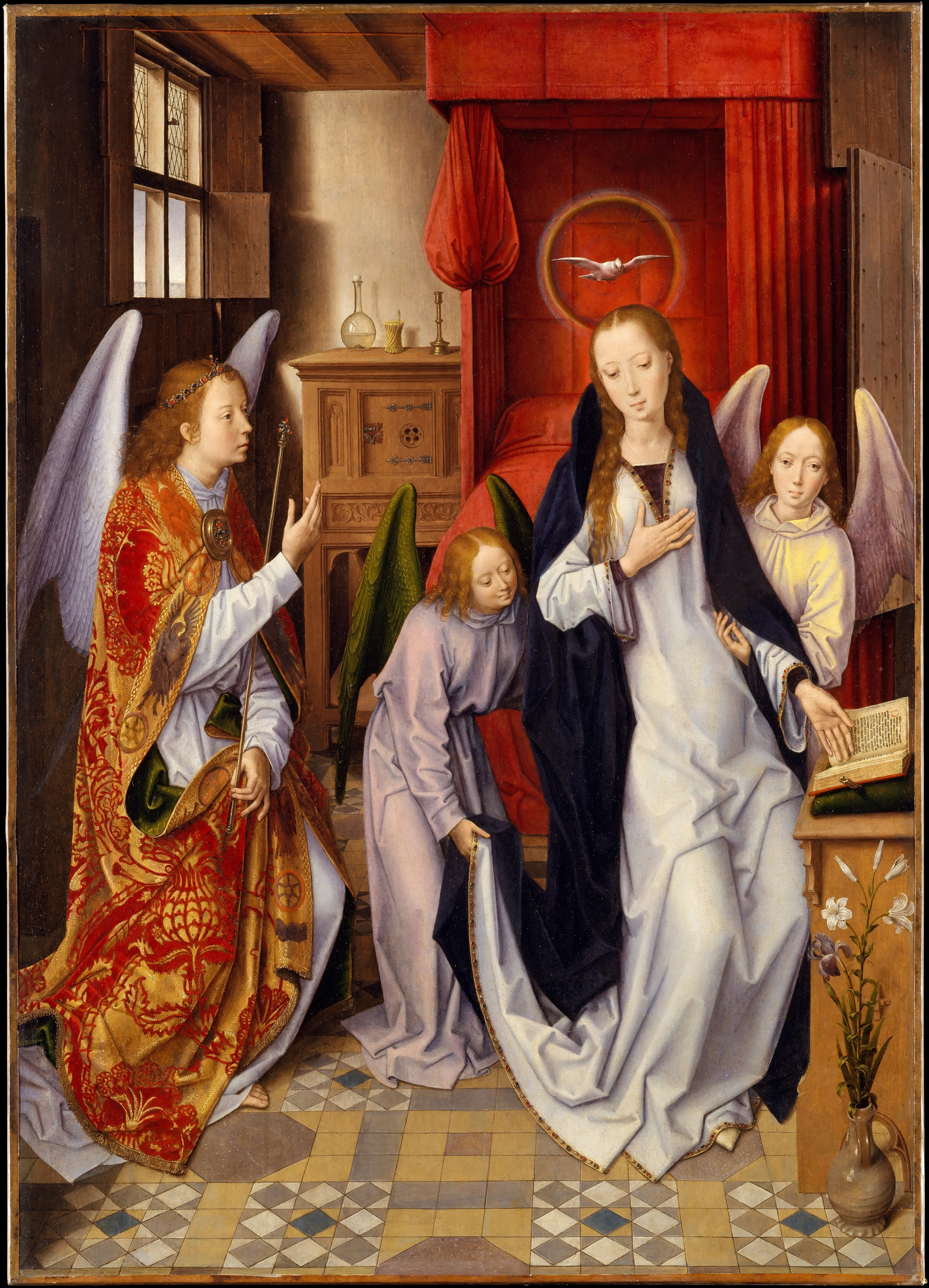
Annunciation by Hans Memling

Hans Leo Hassler studied in Venice with Andrea Gabrieli, and was a musician for the Fugger family in Augsburg. He composed Dixit Maria as a motet for choir a cappella, setting a verse from Luke's narration of the annunciation in Latin, specifically Mary's consent to the announcement that she would bear a son. The motet is suitable for the feast of the Annunciation. He included the motet in his 1591 collection Cantiones sacrae (Sacred songs). Hassler also composed a mass on the theme Dixit Maria, the Missa super Dixit Maria.

Carus-Verlag included the motet in a 2013 Chorbuch Advent, a choral collection for Advent.

== Music ==
The motet is written for four voices, soprano, alto, tenor, and bass. The style is reminiscent of a canzona, in an ABB structure. The a section, rendering the text "Mary said to the angel", is set in imitative polyphony. The B section, repeated with a slightly modified ending, sets Mary's words, beginning in homophony. Few words are accented by melismas, such as "angelum" and "fiat" (may it happen), which summarizes Mary's consent to the incarnation.

== Recordings ==
Dixit Maria was recorded at the Mainz Cathedral in 2014, together with the mass based on it and other music by Hassler, by the Mainzer Domchor, conducted by Karsten Storck. It was recorded by the Cambridge Singers, conducted by John Rutter, as part of an album The Sacred Flame / European Sacred Music of the Renaissance and Baroque Era. A 2018 recording was performed by the Nottingham Cathedral Choir, conducted by Alex Patterson.
