= Hochschule für Musik Mainz =

Hochschule für Musik Mainz an der Johannes Gutenberg-Universität Mainz
- Type: University of Music
- Established: 1948
- Parent institution: Johannes Gutenberg University of Mainz
- Rector: Immanuel Ott
- Students: c. 400
- Location: Mainz, Rhineland-Palatinate, Germany; 49°59′36″N 8°14′12″E
- Website: musik.uni-mainz.de

The Hochschule für Musik Mainz (HfMM, Mainz School of Music) is a university of music, part of the Johannes Gutenberg University of Mainz. It is the only such institution in the German state of Rhineland-Palatinate.

== History ==
The institution was founded in 1948 as Staatliches Institut für Musik. Abteilung Schulmusik, an institute for school music education, by Ernst Laaff and Georg Toussaint. It was named Staatliches Hochschulinstitut für Musik in 1961. It became part of the university in 1973 as Fachbereich Musikerziehung (Department of Music Education). The studies were first mostly educational, for teachers and church musicians. In 1986, more classes were established, and the name changed to Fachbereich Musik (Faculty of Music). In 2003, the institution was named Hochschule für Musik (School of Music), which is connected to the university but governed mostly independently. This approach of the state government is unique in Germany.

A new building for the Musikhochschule was built on the university campus completed in October 2008. It was inaugurated on 24 November 2008 with a ceremony and concert. Wolfram Koloseus conducted the premiere of a composition commissioned for the occasion, Sechs Trakl Gesänge by Thomas Wells after poems by Georg Trakl, a work of 45 minutes for tenor soloist, choir and orchestra, and Mozart's Jupiter Symphony.

The building holds 36 rooms for voice training and instrumental instructions, three rooms for ensembles, a concert hall Roter Saal seating 220 listeners, a hall with an organ and a studio stage Black Box, both for 100 people, a sound studio, listening studio, library, five rooms for theory, two rooms for seminars, 24 rooms for practicing, and rooms for offices. During semesters, concerts by students, teachers and guest artists are frequently performed, offering around 230 concerts per year.

The Hochschule collaborates with numerous cultural institutions of the area, namely the Staatstheater Mainz, the Hessisches Staatstheater Wiesbaden, the state foundation Villa Musica, the Peter Cornelius Conservatory and the institute for church music of the Catholic Diocese of Mainz. The Hochschule and the theatre in Wiesbaden collaborated in 2017 in a staged production of Scarlatti's oratorio La Giuditta.

Since 2023, the rector is Valerie Krupp, who followed Immanuel Ott (rector 2017–23) and Birger Petersen (rector 2015–17), both professors of music theory.

== Studies ==
The university offers bachelor and master degrees in music and music education, in some studies also doctoral degrees. Concert exams are offered for instruments and voice.

=== Bachelor ===
- Elementary teaching
- Jazz and Pop
- Church music
- Piano
- Teaching at gymnasiums
- Voice (opera and concert)
- Orchestral instruments

=== Master and post graduate ===
- Jazz and Pop
- Church music
- Klangkunst – Composition
- Piano
- Teaching at gymnasiums
- Lied accompaniment and correpetition
- Music theory
- Orchestral instruments
- Organ improvisation
- Organ literature
- Voice
- Guitar
- Concert exam
- Doctorate (Music theory / Music education)

=== Further studies ===
- International summer school Singing Summer, master classes for voice and instruments, annually in September from 2004
- College for Early Music Barock vokal, one year of studies for concert and opera singers, founded in 2010
