= Silvia Hauer =

German operatic mezzo-soprano

- Born: Kehl, Baden-Württemberg, Germany
- Education: Musikhochschule Freiburg; University of Music Vienna
- Occupation: Operatic mezzo-soprano
- Organizations: Bayerische Staatoper Hessisches Staatstheater Wiesbaden
- Awards: Bundeswettbewerb Gesang
- Website: silvia-hauer.com/en/home-2/

Silvia Hauer is a German operatic mezzo-soprano. A member of the ensemble of the Hessisches Staatstheater Wiesbaden since 2015, she has performed leading roles such as Cherubino in Mozart's Le nozze di Figaro, Rosina in Rossini's Il Barbiere di Siviglia, Bizet's Carmen, and the title role in Der Rosenkavalier by Richard Strauss. Her concert repertoire includes Oskar Gottlieb Blarr's Jesus-Passion and Verdi's Requiem.

== Career ==
Hauer was born in Kehl. She studied at the Musikhochschule Freiburg and the University of Music in Vienna. She won the competition Jugend musiziert. In the 2010–2011 season, she appeared as the third wood sprite in Dvořák's Rusalka at the Komische Oper Berlin and as Bolette in Vom Meer at the Theater Heidelberg. In 2011, she won the Bundeswettbewerb Gesang competition. She then became a member of the studio of the Bavarian State Opera. until 2013, performing roles such as Annina in Verdi's La traviata, Kate Pinkerton in Puccini's Madama Butterfly, Sandmännchen in Humperdinck's Hänsel und Gretel and Carolina in Henze's Elegie für junge Liebende. She took part in the world premiere of Widmann's Babylon there on 27 October 2012, conducted by Kent Nagano.

She first appeared at the Hessisches Staatstheater Wiesbaden in 2015 as Dorabella in Mozart's Così fan tutte. She became a member of the ensemble, in roles such as Bradamante in Handel's Alcina, Orlofsky in Die Fledermaus by Johann Strauss, Second Lady in Mozart's Die Zauberflöte, Hänsel in Humperdinck's Hänsel und Gretel, Olga in Tchaikovsky's Eugen Onegin, Floßhilde and Second Norn in Wagner's Der Ring des Nibelungen, Cherubino in Mozart's Le nozze di Figaro, Emilia in Verdi's Otello and Suzuki in Madama Butterfly. In the 2018–2019 season she added major roles to her repertoire, including Sesto in Mozart's La clemenza di Tito and Maddalena in Verdi's Rigoletto. The following season, she appeared as both Mercédès and the title role of Bizet's Carmen, and the title role in Der Rosenkavalier by Richard Strauss. In the 2020–2021 season, she performed as Rosina in Rossini's Il Barbiere di Siviglia.

She recorded in 2018 Oskar Gottlieb Blarr's Jesus-Passion, with Gloria Rehm, Sung Min Song, Johannes Hill, Markus Volpert, and Bachchor and Bachorchester Wiesbaden, conducted by Jörg Endebrock.
