= List of Easter hymns =

Easter hymns are hymns dedicated to Eastertide, related to the resurrection of Jesus.

== List of Easter hymns ==
Hymn	Translation	Text	Tune	Language	Published	Notes
"Christ ist erstanden"	Christ is risen	anon.	anon.	German	1160	
"Christ lag in Todesbanden"	Christ lay in the bonds of death	Martin Luther	Martin Luther and Johann Walter	German	1524	melody based on Victimae paschali laudes
"Christ the Lord Is Risen Today"		Charles Wesley	"Easter hymn"	English	1739	
"Christus ist erstanden! O tönt"	Christ is risen! O sound	Johann Weinzierl	Schniebel, Paul	German	1826	paraphrase of Victimae paschali laudes
"Gelobt sei Gott im höchsten Thron"	Praised be God on highest throne	Michael Weiße	Melchior Vulpius	German	1531 / 1609	melody later
"Ihr Christen, singet hocherfreut"	You Christians, sing in great joy	Christoph Moufang	from Paris 1623	German	1865	based on O filii et filiae
"Lasst uns erfreuen"	Let us rejoice	anon.		German	1623	
"O Licht der wunderbaren Nacht"	O light of the wonderful night	Georg Thurmair	from Mainz, c. 1390	German	1963	
"Seht, er lebt"	Look, he lives	Lothar Zenetti	from Israel	German	1973	
"Thine Be the Glory, Risen Conquering Son"		Edmond Louis Budry, translated by Richard Hoyle	"Maccabaeus"	English/French	1923	Originally published in French as "À toi la gloire O Ressuscité"
"Wahrer Gott, wir glauben dir"	True God, we believe You	Christoph Bernhard Verspoell	Verspoell	German	1810	
"Ye Choirs of New Jerusalem"		Robert Campbell	"St. Fulbert"	English	1850	Based on Chorus novae Ierusalem by Fulbert of Chartres
