= Das Weizenkorn muss sterben =

Poem by Lothar Zenetti

- Christian hymn (poem)
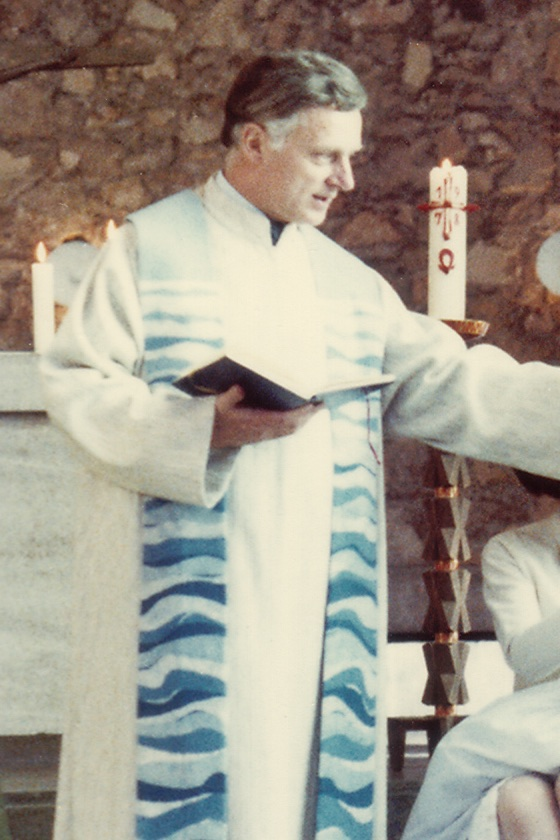
- Lothar Zenetti in his parish church St. Wendel, Frankfurt, in 1978
- English: The grain of wheat must die
- Written: 1971
- Text: by Lothar Zenetti
- Language: German
- Based on: The Grain of Wheat
- Meter: 7 6 7 6 6 6
- Melody: by Johann Lauermann
- Composed: 1972
- Published: 1975

"Das Weizenkorn muss sterben" (The grain of wheat must die) is a poem by Lothar Zenetti, based on The Grain of Wheat. With a 1972 melody by Johann Lauermann, it became a Christian hymn of the genre Neues Geistliches Lied (NGL), appearing from 1975 in German hymnals. It is popular, and is regarded as Zenetti's signature work.

== History ==
Zenetti wrote the text in 1971, based on the biblical parable of The Grain of Wheat. With a 1972 melody by Johann Lauermann, it was included in the German Catholic hymnal Gotteslob of 1975 as GL 620, and in the 2013 edition as GL 210, designated as a song for communion or as thanks for communion. It was also printed in the Protestant hymnal of 1995 Evangelisches Gesangbuch, as EG 579, and in other songbooks. It is popular, and is regarded as Zenetti's signature work. The text was printed again in 2016 as part of a book Wie ein Traum, a collection of texts by Zenetti.

== Text and theme ==
Zenetti based the text on The Grain of Wheat, a passage from the Gospel of John which says that the grain of wheat needs to die in order to bear fruit (John 12:24–26). The poem is structured in four stanzas, each in four short lines, with the fourth of them rhyming with the second, followed by two equally short lines which are the same for all four stanzas: "Geheimnis des Glaubens: im Tod ist das Leben. (Mystery of faith: in death there is life.) The phrase "mystery of faith" is based on 1 Timothy 3:9, which is quoted in the Eucharistic prayer during Mass.

In the first stanza, the passage from John is applied to life among people: nobody can live alone. The second stanza mentions Jesus giving up his life as a gift, like bread. Those taking the bread (of the Eucharist) proclaim his death. The third stanza looks at those celebrating this mystery, and requests them to be "eaten" by the suffering of other people. The final stanza, saying "we" for the first time, requests that we are bread for others, living for each other, with only love counting ("und nur die Liebe zählt").
