= Segne dieses Kind =

- Christian hymn (poem)
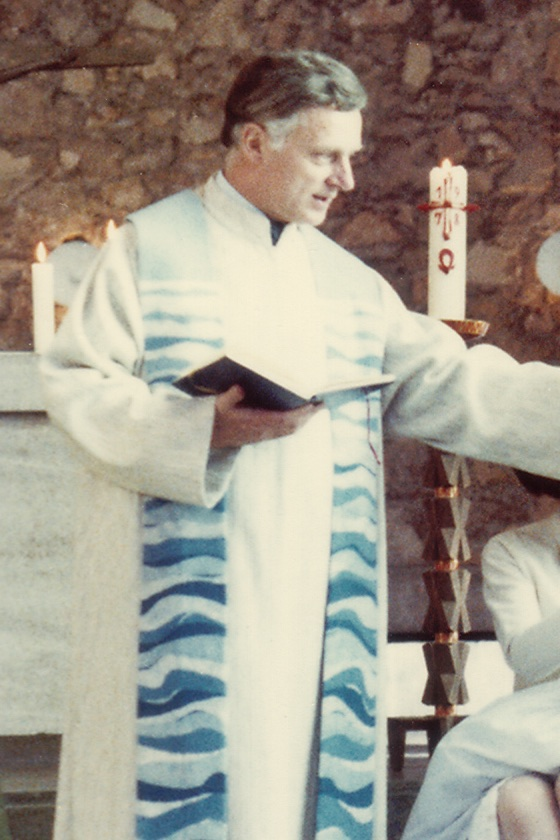
- Zenetti in 1978 at St. Wendel
- Written: c. 1971
- Text: by Lothar Zenetti
- Language: German
- Melody: by Erna Woll (1971); by Michael Schütz (1983)

"Segne dieses Kind" (Bless this child) is a poem in six stanzas by Lothar Zenetti. With different melodies, it became a Christian hymn of the genre Neues Geistliches Lied (NGL), appearing in current German hymnals, usually sung for baptism. The full title is "Segne dieses Kind und hilf uns, ihm zu helfen" (Bless this child and help us to help him), which is the beginning of all six stanzas.

The first five stanzas follow the same pattern: a group of people feeling responsible for a child express that they request blessing for the child, and blessing for themselves, helping them to help the child to learn. It should learn to see, to hear, to reach out, to speak, to walk, to love. In five stanzas, the ability is further described by poetic images, for example "to see": the mother's face, the colours of the flowers, the snow on the mountains, the country of promise. Verheißung (promise) is the last word in all five stanzas. The last stanza is shorter, ending the poem on "learn to love with his whole heart" ("dass es lieben lernt mit seinem ganzen Herzen").

The text was written in 1971. It was included in the Catholic German hymnal Gotteslob (GL) with a melody by Erna Woll (former GL 636). It was also printed in 1981 in the collection Lieder vom neuen Leben (Songs of new life).

A different melody by Michael Schütz, composed in 1983, appears in current German hymnals, both in the new Gotteslob (GL 490), as in Protestant hymnals. The text was published also in Texte der Zuversicht by J. Pfeiffer Verlag in Munich in 1987.

The text was printed again in 2012 as part of Zenetti's book Auf seiner Spur. It has been used for books and greeting cards for birth and baptism.
