= Seht, der Stein ist weggerückt =

German Catholic poem and hymn

- Christian Easter hymn
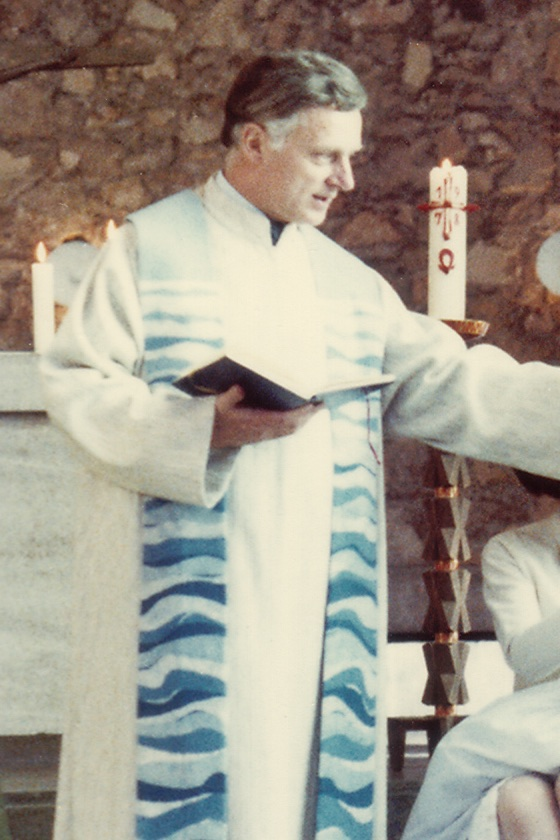
- Lothar Zenetti in his parish church St. Wendel, Frankfurt, in 1978
- English: Look, the stone is moved away
- Written: 1971
- Text: Lothar Zenetti
- Language: German
- Melody: by Karl Fink (1975), Josef Oestemer (2011)
- Published: 1975

"Seht, der Stein ist weggerückt" (Look, the stone is moved away) is an Easter hymn in German with text written by the Catholic priest Lothar Zenetti in 1971. With a 2011 melody by Josef Oestemer, it became a Neues Geistliches Lied (NGL) published in 2013 in the Catholic hymnal Gotteslob, as GL 783 in the regional section for the Diocese of Limburg.

== History ==
Zenetti wrote the text in 1971. It appeared in the German Catholic hymnal Gotteslob in the regional section for the Diocese of Limburg as GL 836 with a melody by Karl Fink. With a new melody by Josef Oestemer, composed in 2011, it was included in the German Catholic hymnal Gotteslob in the regional section for Limburg as GL 783.

== Text ==
Zenetti created a song in three stanzas of four stanzas each. Every stanza is closed by a three-fold Halleluja. A comparison of 15 new Easter hymns shows that two-thirds of them include a statement about the living Jesus, and all of them mention implications for the singers in the present and their reaction.

The first stanza begins "Seht, der Stein ist weggerückt", sharing the observation at the grave of Jesus on Easter morning. The line continues "nicht mehr, wo er war" (no longer, where it was). This thought is applied more generally to other concepts no longer what there were, such as grave no longer grave, death no longer death, end no longer end. The third stanza says that Jesus is risen and no longer there, and calling those addressed to go with him in the world where he went first.
