= Einer ist unser Leben =

German poem and Christian hymn

- Christian hymn (poem)
- Written: c. 1971
- Text: by Lothar Zenetti
- Language: German
- Melody: Jean Liesse

"Einer ist unser Leben" (One is our life) is a poem in five stanzas, written by Lothar Zenetti in 1973. It became a Christian hymn of the genre Neues Geistliches Lied (NGL) with a 1971 melody by Jean Liesse. The song is part of many hymnals, both Catholic and Protestant, and of songbooks, remaining popular in the 21st century.

== History ==
Zenetti was parish priest of St. Wendel in Frankfurt from 1969 to 1995. With 150 poems set to music, he is regarded as one of the prominent authors in the Neues Geistliches Lied (NGL) genre. He wrote the text of Einer ist unser Leben in 1973. It was included in regional sections of the Catholic German hymnal Gotteslob with a 1971 melody by Jean Liesse. In the Diocese of Limburg, it appeared in the 1975 first edition as GL 939, and in the 2013 edition as GL 798. In the Protestant hymnal Evangelisches Gesangbuch, it is EG 522. It is also part of other hymnals and songbooks, such as the collection Durch Hohes und Tiefes of the congregation of Protestant students, and morning has broken / Pop-Chorbuch zum EG, a pop choral book for the Evangelisches Gesangbuch. Due to its general theme, the song has been recommended for several occasions, including preparation of the gifts and Easter.

The text was included in the 2015 collection In Seiner Nähe. Texte des Vertrauen. (Close to Him. Texts of trust.) of texts by Zenetti by a group of publishers including Matthias Grünewald Verlag. In 2020, it was recommended for a regional ecumenical service in preparation of the planned Kirchentag in Frankfurt in 2021.

== Text and theme ==
The song begins with the refrain, saying that there is someone, and only one, who is our life, a light on our ways, a hope derived from death, and who frees us. In five stanzas, something that is wrong is contrasted with the model of the (unnamed) Jesus. The first verse looks at the unfair distribution of food, the second at people not recognized and discriminated, the third at weapons and war, the fourth at people blind and afraid to speak up, and the fifth at people with doubts. Every refrain juxtaposes a line beginning with "Viele" (many) and a line beginning with "Einer" (one), for example "Viele werden verkann und verlacht, diskrimiert. Einer nahm sich der Wehrlosen an und erbarmt sich der Armen." (Many are misjudged and ridiculed, discriminated. One took care of the defenseless and had mercy on the poor.)

The viewpoint of the text has been described as a "Christology from below" (Christologie von unten), looking at aspects of Christ as a person as a model of humanity.
