= Seht, er lebt =

German Catholic poem and hymn

- Christian Easter hymn
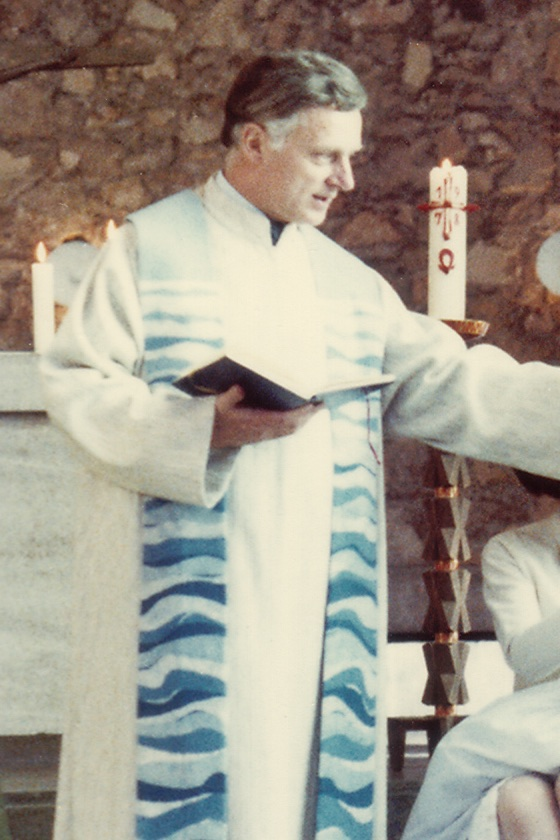
- Lothar Zenetti in his parish church St. Wendel, Frankfurt, in 1978
- English: Look, he lives
- Written: 1973
- Text: Lothar Zenetti
- Language: German
- Melody: Israeli
- Published: 1975

"Seht, er lebt" (Look, he lives) is a Christian poem written by the Catholic priest Lothar Zenetti in 1973. With an Israeli melody, it became an Easter hymn in the Neues Geistliches Lied (NGL) genre, first published in 1975. In the 2013 Catholic hymnal Gotteslob, it appears as GL 781 in the regional section for the Diocese of Limburg.

== History ==
Zenetti wrote the text in 1973. The poem appeared in the collection Sieben Farben hat das Licht, by J. Pfeiffer in Munich. With a traditional melody from Israel, it was included in the German Catholic hymnal Gotteslob of 1975 in the regional section for the Diocese of Limburg as GL 835. In the 2013 edition it is GL 781 in the section for Easter, as a new Easter hymn.

== Text and melody ==
Zenetti created a refrain and four stanzas, both of four lines each, to a popular melody from Israel which is also used for the earlier song "Kommt herbei, singt dem Herrn" by Diethard Zils (GL 140), a paraphrase of Psalm 95. While Zils repeated his lines when the music repeats, Zenetti wrote consecutive text in both refrain and stanzas.

The refrain begins and ends the song, calling to look:

Full of exclamation marks, the lines refer to Jesus, who rose on the third day and "stands among us". A comparison of 15 new Easter hymns shows that two-thirds of them include a statement about the living Jesus, and all of them mention implications for the singers in the present and their reaction.

The first stanza begins "Kommt durch die verschlossnen Türen" (Comes through the locked doors), alluding to post-resurrection appearances of Jesus and stressing that Jesus says now as back then: "Habt keine Angst." (Do not be afraid.) and "Friede sei mit euch." (Peace be with you.) The second stanza begins "Und wir hören seine Worte" (And we listen to his words), referring to the two disciples walking to Emmaus, for whom he broke the bread. The third stanza begins "Keiner lebt nur für sich selber" (Nobody lives only for himself), presenting the idea that believers ("we") live and die belonging to the Lord. The final stanza begins "Er ist bei uns alle Tage" (He is with us always), recalling the promise at the ascension, according to Matthew 28:20.

The song was set for four-part choir by Jürgen Theis, published by Butz. Kurt Grahl composed a setting for four-part choir, trumpet and strings or keyboard instrument.
