= Das eine Brot wächst auf vielen Halmen =

Christian offertory hymn

- Christian offertory hymn
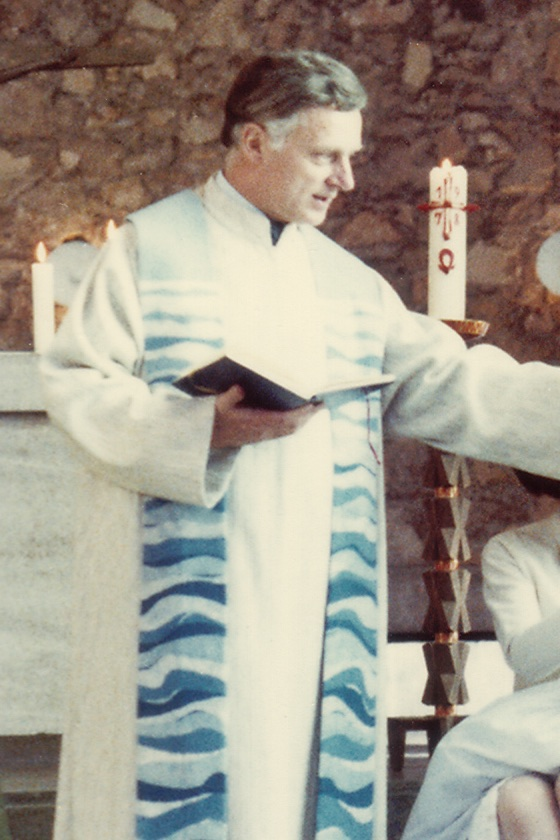
- Lothar Zenetti in his parish church St. Wendel, Frankfurt, in 1978
- English: The one bread grows on many stalks
- Written: 1972
- Text: by Lothar Zenetti
- Language: German
- Melody: from Israel
- Published: 1975

"Das eine Brot wächst auf vielen Halmen" (The one bread grows on many stalks) is a Christian offertory hymn with words by Lothar Zenetti set to an Israeli melody. It can be sung as a round. Of the genre Neues Geistliches Lied (NGL), it has appeared in German hymnals since 1975. The hymn has been used for both Catholic Corpus Christi processions and Protestant Kirchentag conventions.

== History ==
Lothar Zenetti wrote the words of the offertory hymn in 1972. It was included, with a melody from Israel, in regional sections of the 1975 German Catholic hymnal Gotteslob, such as GL 931 in the Diocese of Limburg. In the 2013 edition the hymn appeared as GL 728 in Limburg, and as GL 969 in the Diocese of Bamberg. It was also printed in other songbooks.

== Melody and musical settings ==
The melody is a traditional tune, which originated in Israel and became an American folk song. It is in two parts which can be sung as a round. Herbert Bauerle composed in 1980 a four-part accompaniment for keyboard, with an optional upper voice, intonation, interludes and postlude, published in Beuerle's collection Singe, Christenheit.

== Usage ==
The song is an offertory hymn, especially recommended for celebrating First Communion. In 2008, the song was the motto of a procession on the Feast of Corpus Christi in Bonn, in connection with a United Nations conference on species conservation. A service and procession in Bremen with a bishop from Osnabrück in 2012 used the same motto, reflecting the merger of many parishes to one.

It has featured at Protestant Kirchentag conventions, such as 1983 in Hannover, where purple shawls demonstrated Frieden schaffen ohne Waffen ('Create peace without weapons'), and in 2017 in Berlin to commemorate 500 years of the Protestant Reformation.
