= Nahe wollt der Herr uns sein =

1973 hymn

"Nahe wollt der Herr uns sein" "Omdat hij niet ver wou zijn"
- Christian hymn
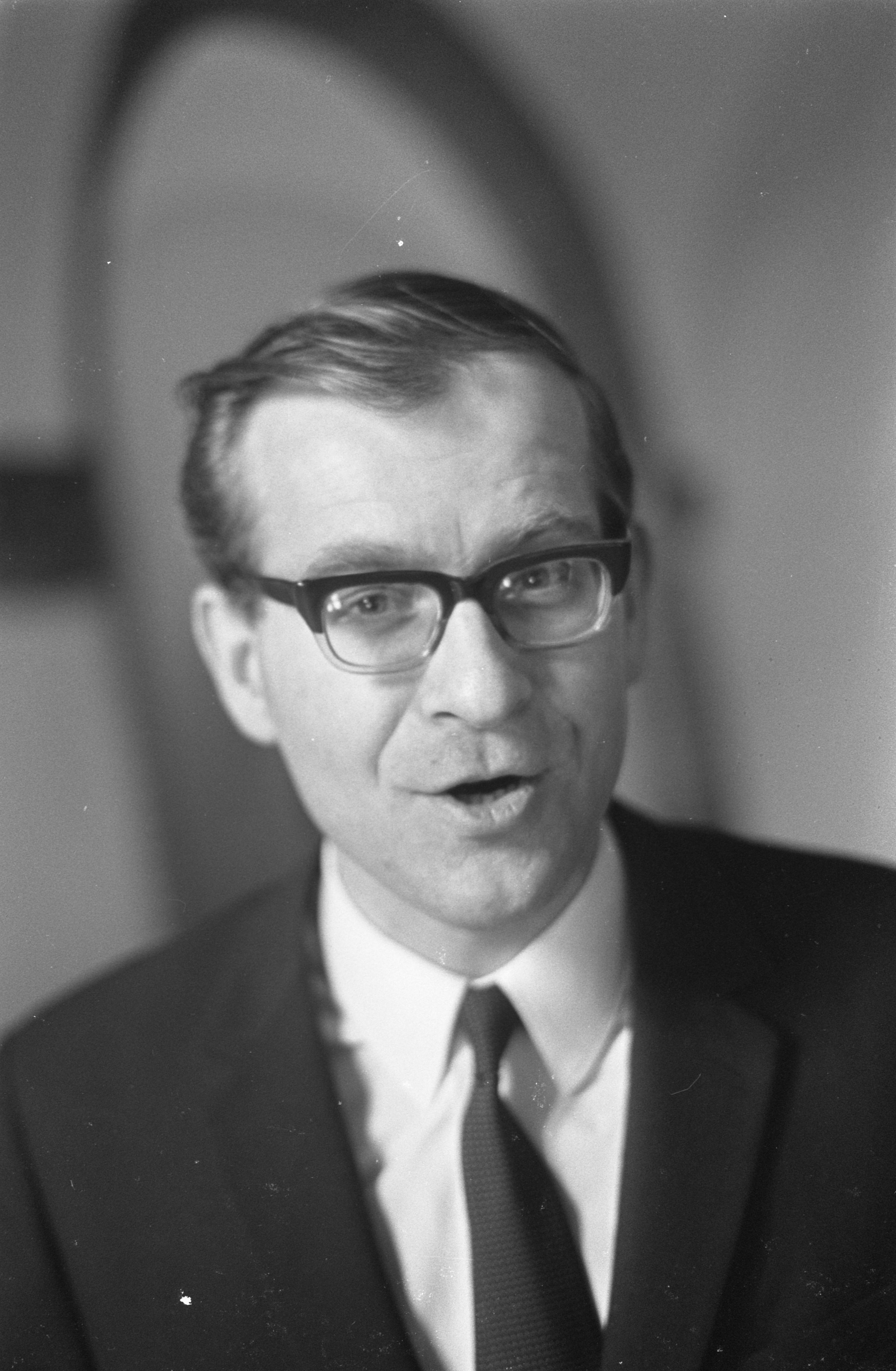
- Huub Oosterhuis in 1964
- Written: 1964/1971
- Text: translating Huub Oosterhuis
- Language: German
- Melody: Bernard Huijbers
- Composed: 1964
- Published: 1975

"Nahe wollt der Herr uns sein" (The Lord wanted to be close to us) is a Christian hymn with German text, translated in 1971 from a 1964 Dutch hymn by Huub Oosterhuis. Its refrain says that God is among people but not recognised. The song, of the genre Neues Geistliches Lied (NGL), appeared from 1975 in German hymnals, then in the common section of the Catholic Gotteslob. In the hymnal's second edition, it appeared only in regional sections.

== History ==
In the 1960s Oosterhuis was a Catholic priest in Amsterdam in a parish of students. The group was interested in a renewal of the language in the liturgy, both sung and spoken. Inspired by the Second Vatican Council, their service was primarily a meeting of people, intending to serve and proclaim Biblical words. Oosterhuis wrote the hymn text as "Omdat hij niet ver wou zijn" in 1964. His songs are, like the psalms, "tentative approaches to answer questions of God and man" (tastende Versuche, die Frage nach Gott und dem Menschen zu beantworten).

The melody was composed by Bernard Huijbers. The translation to German was made by Nicolas Schalz in 1971. The hymn was included in the first common German Catholic hymnal Gotteslob of 1975 as GL 617. Intentions to ban songs by Osterhuis from the 2013 edition, because he and his parish had left the Catholic Church, were met with protests from German parishes. "Nahe wollt der Herr uns sein" was included only in regional sections of the Gotteslob in the 2013 second edition, such as GL 807 for the Diocese of Limburg. It is also part of other songbooks, including the Swiss hymnal Kirchengesangbuch as KG 599.

Oosterhuis received an ecumenical German sermon prize in 2014 for his life's work, in recognition of the great influence of his hymns in German parishes.

== Text and theme ==
The text is in five stanzas, each with four lines followed by a refrain of one repeated line: "Mitten unter euch steht er, den er nicht kennt" (Amongst you he stands, whom you don't recognise), expressing that God is secretly close to people. The first stanza says that God wanted to be close to humans ("uns" = "us"). The second stanza points out that he is near us on hidden paths ("auf verborgnen Wegen"). The third stanza quotes the Gloria (God from God, Light from Light), stating that he came to be a brother to all. In the fourth stanza, everybody is encouraged to follow his model of being good to each other in patience and love. The fifth stanza requests to be therefore joyful and free of cares as he dwells with people.

== Uses ==
A 1981 book for Advent was named after the hymn.
