= Spiritual dryness =

Feeling of spiritual desolation

In Catholic spirituality, spiritual dryness or desolation is a lack of spiritual consolation in one's spiritual life. It is a form of spiritual crisis experienced subjectively as a sense of separation from God or lack of spiritual feeling, especially during contemplative prayer.

== Desolation ==
The Catechism of the Catholic Church (CCC) describes spiritual dryness as a difficulty sometimes experienced in one's prayer life, which may lead to discouragement. Dryness can expose a lack of "rootedness" in the faith, but also provides an opportunity to cling more strongly to God. The CCC makes reference to the seed that fell on the rocks in Parable of the Sower, as well as to the Grain of Wheat allegory found in the Gospel of John. The Catholic Encyclopedia calls it a form of "passive purification," the fruit of which is "the purification of love, until the soul is so inflamed with love of God that it feels as if wounded and languishes with the desire to love Him still more intensely."

The theme of spiritual dryness can be found in the Book of Job, the Psalms, the experiences of the Prophets, and many passages of the New Testament, as illustrated above.

== Description by saints ==
A number of Catholic saints have written about their experiences of spiritual dryness. In the 16th century, Saint John of the Cross famously described it as "the Dark Night of the Soul". The 17th-century Benedictine mystic Fr. Augustine Baker called it the "great desolation". Mother Teresa's diaries show that she experienced spiritual dryness for most of her life.

Chapters IX and XIV of Saint Francis de Sales's book Introduction to the Devout Life also features content regarding spiritual dryness.

== See also ==
- Mystical theology
- State (theology)
