= Lothar Zenetti =

German Catholic theologian and writer (1926–2019)

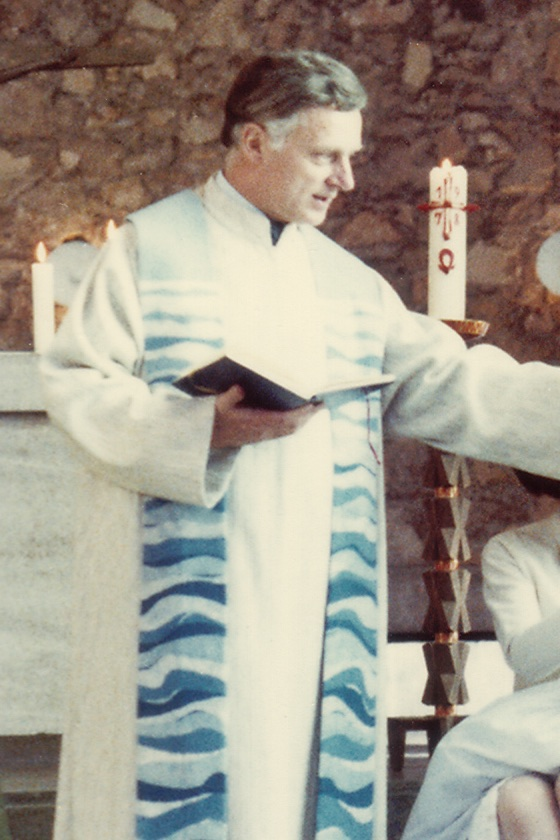
- Zenetti in 1978 at St. Wendel
- Born: 6 February 1926; Frankfurt, Germany
- Died: 24 February 2019 (aged 93); Frankfurt, Germany
- Education: Sankt Georgen Graduate School of Philosophy and Theology
- Occupations: Theologian; Priest; Writer; Hymnwriter

Ecclesiastical career
- Religion: Christianity
- Church: Roman Catholic Church
- Ordained: 28 September 1952
- Writings: Das Weizenkorn muss sterben
- Congregations served: St. Bonifatius, Wiesbaden; St. Wendel, Frankfurt (1962-1995)

Lothar Zenetti (6 February 1926 – 24 February 2019) was a German Catholic theologian, priest, and author of books and poetry. In Frankfurt, he was both a minister for young people and a parish priest. He was also active on radio and television. His songs, for example the popular "Das Weizenkorn muss sterben" and "Segne dieses Kind", appear in both Protestant and Catholic hymnals.

== Life and work ==
Zenetti was born in Frankfurt am Main. From 1931 he attended the Bonifatius-Schule, and the Goethe-Gymnasium beginning in 1936. He began national service in 1943, first with the Luftwaffenhelfer, then with the Reichsarbeitsdienst. At the end of the War, he was a prisoner of war, first of the Americans, then the French. During this time he began to study theology at the so-called Stacheldrahtseminar (barbed-wire seminary) of Chartres.

Back in Frankfurt, Zenetti completed his Abitur and studied at the Sankt Georgen Graduate School of Philosophy and Theology. He graduated in 1952 and was ordained a priest on 28 September 1952 by Wilhelm Kempf in Limburg an der Lahn. He worked as a Kaplan (vicar) in Oberbrechen, Kölbingen, Königstein im Taunus and at St. Bonifatius in Wiesbaden. In 1962 he became Stadtjugendpfarrer (minister for young people) in Frankfurt. He was a parish priest in St. Wendel in Frankfurt-Sachsenhausen from 1962 to 1995.

Zenetti published several books and many poems. His song "Das Weizenkorn muss sterben" (The wheat kernel must die), part of Catholic and Protestant hymnals, is popular. About 150 of his poems were set to music in the genre Neues Geistliches Lied (NGL), several were included in hymnals, others appeared in song collections and were recorded, like the ballad "Was keiner wagt" by the singer-songwriter (Liedermacher) Konstantin Wecker. He translated hymns by the Dutch priest and lyricist Huub Oosterhuis into German, such as "Ik sta voor U in leegte en gemis" to "Ich steh vor dir mit leeren Händen, Herr" which is part of both Gotteslob and Evangelisches Gesangbuch. He also wrote texts and songs in the Mundart (dialect). Zenetti worked on the public television series Das Wort zum Sonntag, and was the representative of the Catholic Church for the broadcaster Hessischer Rundfunk.

In 1984 Zenetti was awarded the prize Humor in der Kirche (Humour in the church) by the Diocese of Limburg. He died in Frankfurt on 24 February 2019 at the age of 93.

== Works ==
Forty-eight publications by Zenetti are listed by the German National Library (DNB).

=== Books ===
- Nägel mit Köpfen. Handreichungen für das Glaubensgespräch, 1960
- Gottes frohe Kinderschar. Werkbuch für kirchliche Kinderarbeit, 1961
- Kinderwelt und Gotteswort. Hundert Kinderansprachen, 1962
- Morgens, mittwochs und abends.. Werkbuch für Mädchengruppe und -freizeit, 1963
- Peitsche und Psalm.Spirituals und Gospelsongs. Geschichte und Glaube der Neger Nordamerikas, 1963
- Initiativen. Junge Christen in einer großen Stadt. Reportagen, 1964
- Heiße (W)Eisen in der Kirche. Jazz, Beat, Songs, Schlager in der Kirche?, 1966
- Zeitansage. Werkbuch zum Gottesdienst einer neuen Generation, 1969
- Texte der Zuversicht. Für den einzelnen und die Gemeinde, 1972
- Sieben Farben hat das Licht, 1975
- Gästebuch des lieben Gottes. Gemeinde zwischen Wunsch und Wirklichkeit, 1975
- Das allerschönste Fest. Ein Frankfurter Weihnachtsbuch, 1977
- Die wunderbare Zeitvermehrung. Variationen zum Evangelium, 1979
- ’s Frankforder Christkindche. Zwei Krippenspiele in Frankfurter Mundart, 1981
- Manchmal leben wir schon. Wege, die der Glaube geht. Rundfunk-Ansprachen, 1981, 2002
- Die Stunde der Seiltänzer. Geschichten und Gedichte, 1982
- Wunder geschehen nicht nur sonntags. Erfahrungen mit dem Alltag, Rundfunkansprachen, 1984
- Meine Zeit in guten Händen. Mit alten Bildern, Bräuchen und Gebeten durch das Jahr, 1985
- Das Jesuskind. Verehrung, Darstellung, Kunst und Frömmigkeit , 1987
- Wir sind noch zu retten. Neue Texte der Zuversicht, 1989
- Auf Seiner Spur. Texte gläubiger Zuversicht, Topos Taschenbücher Bd. 327, 2000
- In Seiner Nähe, 2002

=== Songs ===
Some of Zenetti's songs have been included in hymnals, such as Evangelisches Gesangbuch (EG) and the Catholic Gotteslob.

- "Das eine Brot wächst auf vielen Halmen" (GL 728, Limburg)
- "Das Kreuz des Jesus Christus", music by Peter Janssens and Heinz Martin Lonquich
- "Das Lied von der Veränderung der Welt", music by Christoph Enzinger
- "Der am Kreuz ist meine Liebe", after Klopstock (GL 774, Limburg)
- "Das Weizenkorn muss sterben", 1971, music by Johann Lauermann (EG 585, GL 620, formerly 218)
- "Einer ist unser Leben", 1973, tune by Jeas Liesse (GL 798, Limburg)
- "Segne dieses Kind und hilf uns, ihm zu helfen", 1971
  music by Erna Woll, 1971 (former GL 636)
  music by Michael Schütz, 1983 (EG 581, GL 490)
- "Herr, segne uns", 1971, tune by Karl Fink (GL 848, former GL 919, Limburg)
- "Seht, das Brot, das wir teilen", 1972, tune: Rolf Schweizer 1983, (EG 226)
- "Seht, der Stein ist weggerückt"
  music by Karl Fink, 1975 (former GL 836 in Limburg)
  music by Josef Oestemer, 2011 (GL 783 in Limburg)
- "Seht, er lebt", 1973, tune: from Israel, (GL 781 Limburg)
- "Stille lass mich finden", music by Peter Reulein 1999
- "Was keiner wagt", music by Konstantin Wecker
- "Weder Tod noch Leben", 1972, music by Bertold Hummel 1976
- "Wie ein Traum wird es sein", music by Herbert Beuerle
- "Wir alle essen von einem Brot", 1969, music by Ingrid Hirschfeldt 1969 (former GL 539)
- "Wir sind mitten im Leben", 1970, music by Herbert Beuerle (former GL 655)
- "Wir sprechen verschiedene Sprachen", music by Winfried Heurich
- "Worauf sollen wir hören", 1971, music by Peter Kempin (former GL 623)
- translation of "Ik sta voor U in leegte en gemis" by Huub Oosterhuis: "Ich steh vor dir mit leeren Händen, Herr", 1974, (EG 382, GL 422/621)
