= Herr, segne uns =

1971 poem

- Christian hymn (poem)
- Written: 1971
- Text: by Lothar Zenetti
- Language: German
- Melody: by Karl Fink

"Herr, segne uns" (Lord, bless us) is a poem in three stanzas by Lothar Zenetti, written in 1971. With a 1972 melody by Karl Fink, it became a Christian hymn of the genre Neues Geistliches Lied (NGL), appearing in German hymnals. It is usually sung at the end of a service before the blessing. The full title is "Herr, segne uns, lass uns dir dankbar sein" (Lord, bless us, let us be thankful to you).

The three stanzas, of four lines each, follow a pattern: the first line rhymes with the (shorter) last, while the inner lines of equal length rhyme. Each stanza begins with a call from a group, asking the Lord to bless them, to go with them, and to send them. Each stanza concludes with a short summary, "wollen wir tätig sein" (we want to be active), "lass uns Geschwister sein" (let us be siblings), and "lass uns ein Segen sein" (let us be a blessing.

The text was written in 1971. It was included in the regional part of the Catholic German hymnal Gotteslob for the Diocese of Limburg as GL 919, with a melody by Karl Fink, a church musician. In the current Gotteslob, it is GL 848.
