= St. Nikolaus von Flüe, Wörsdorf =

Catholic church in Wörsdorf, Idstein, Rheingau-Taunus-Kreis, Germany

Coordinates: 50.2464°N 8.2498°E

St. Nikolaus von Flüe
- Katholische Pfarrkirche St. Nikolaus von Flüe; Gemeinde St. Martin Idsteiner Land
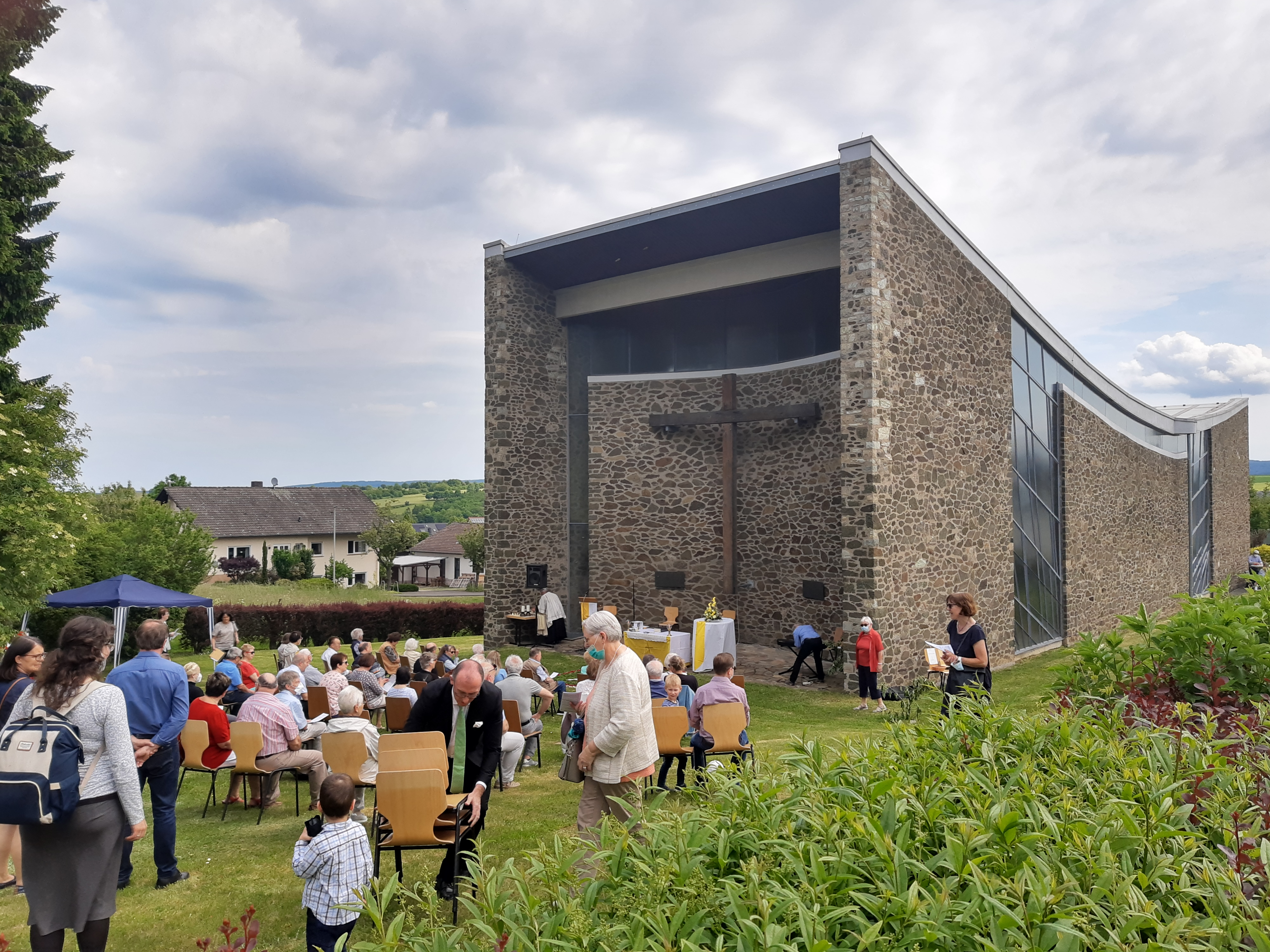
- The back of the church in preparation for Corpus Christi
- St. Nikolaus von Flüe
- Location: Idstein-Wörsdorf, Germany
- Denomination: Catholic
- Website: www.st-martin-idstein.de

History
- Dedication: Nicholas of Flüe
- Consecrated: 1962

Architecture
- Architect: Johannes Krahn

Administration
- Diocese: Limburg

St. Nikolaus von Flüe is the name of a Catholic church in Wörsdorf, part of Idstein, Rheingau-Taunus-Kreis, Germany. The official name of the church is Katholische Pfarrkirche St. Nikolaus von Flüe (Catholic parish church Nikolaus of Flüe). When it was dedicated, the name was St. Nikolaus-von-Flüe-Friedenskirche, designating it as a peace church. The Wörsdorf parish belongs to St. Martin Idsteiner Land. The church, the first Catholic church in Wörsdorf, was designed by Johannes Krahn, and consecrated in December 1962.

== History ==
Wörsdorf had only few Catholic inhabitants until the end of World War II, when many people arrived as refugees who were expelled from Silesia, East Prussia, Sudetenland and Hungary. They were transported by bus to church services in St. Martin, Idstein. Plans to build a local church resulted in a 1959 commission to Johannes Krahn, who built several churches and early skyscrapers such as the Beehive House in Frankfurt am Main. It was first also meant to serve as a Autobahnkirche for the near-by highway. That purpose had to be given up when a planned exit was not approved. Construction began in 1961, and the church was consecrated on 8 December 1962. It was dedicated to Nicholas of Flüe, and named Friedenskirche ("Peace Church").

The building is listed as a cultural monument for historic and artistic reasons ("Kulturdenkmal aus geschichtlichen und künstlerischen Gründen"). The parish was merged on 1 January 2017 to St. Martin Idsteiner Land, part of the Diocese of Limburg.

== Architecture ==
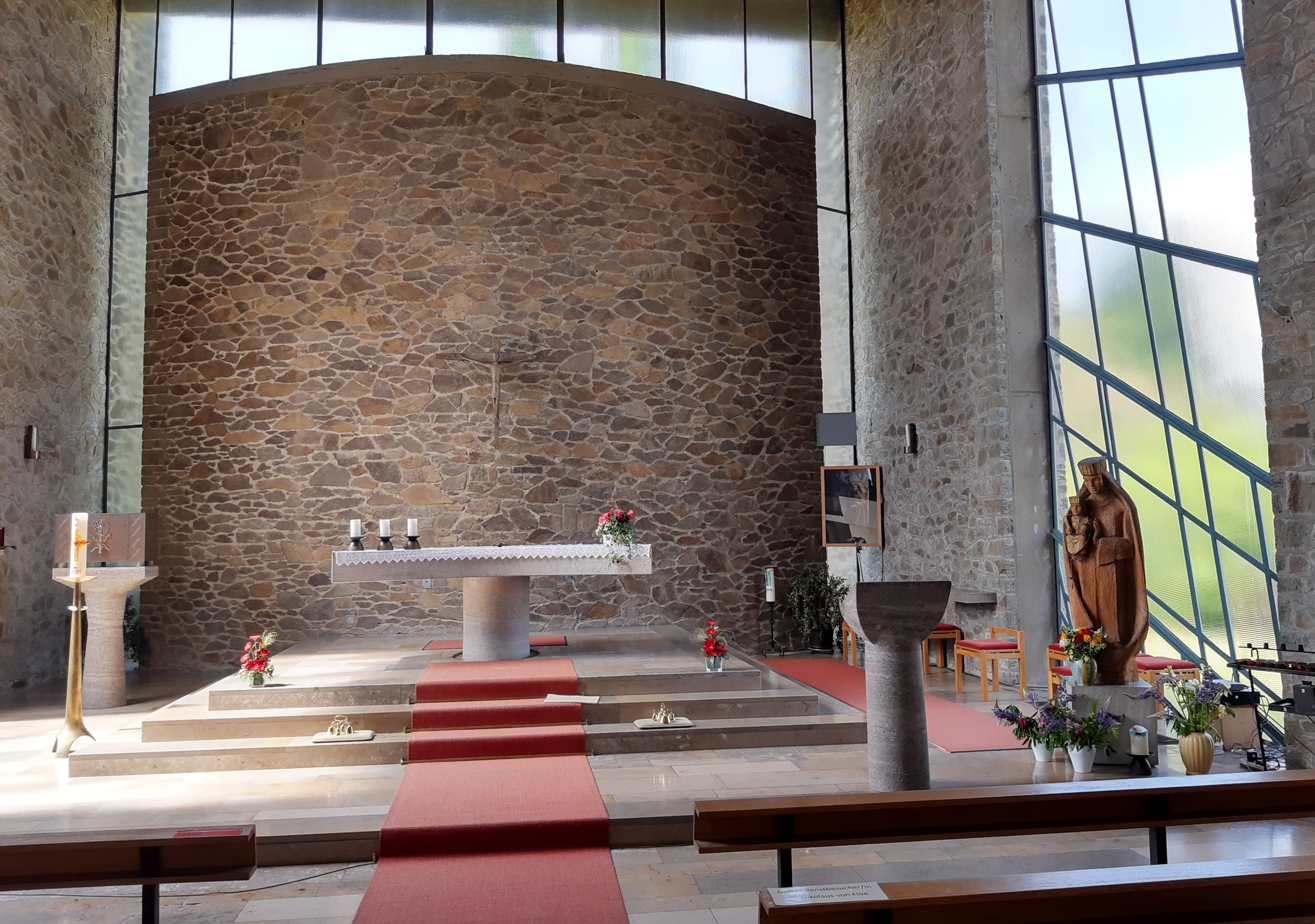
Altar area

The church is reminiscent of an early Romanesque basilica, with a floorplan of an elongated square. The walls are in rubble masonry, with vertical glass bands. The roof is a thin concave curved concrete shell. Krahn designed the altar made of shell limestone. A bronze cross above the altar was created by Hans Mettel from Frankfurt. The first organ came from the demolished Magdalenenkirche in Idstein, but it was replaced by a new organ in 1970. The church is one of a series of buildings designed by Krahn in the 1950s and 1960s that are characterised by simple but effective spatial geometry, and by heavy walls and ceilings structured by glass elements.
