= Wie als een God wil leven =

1965 song

- Christian hymn
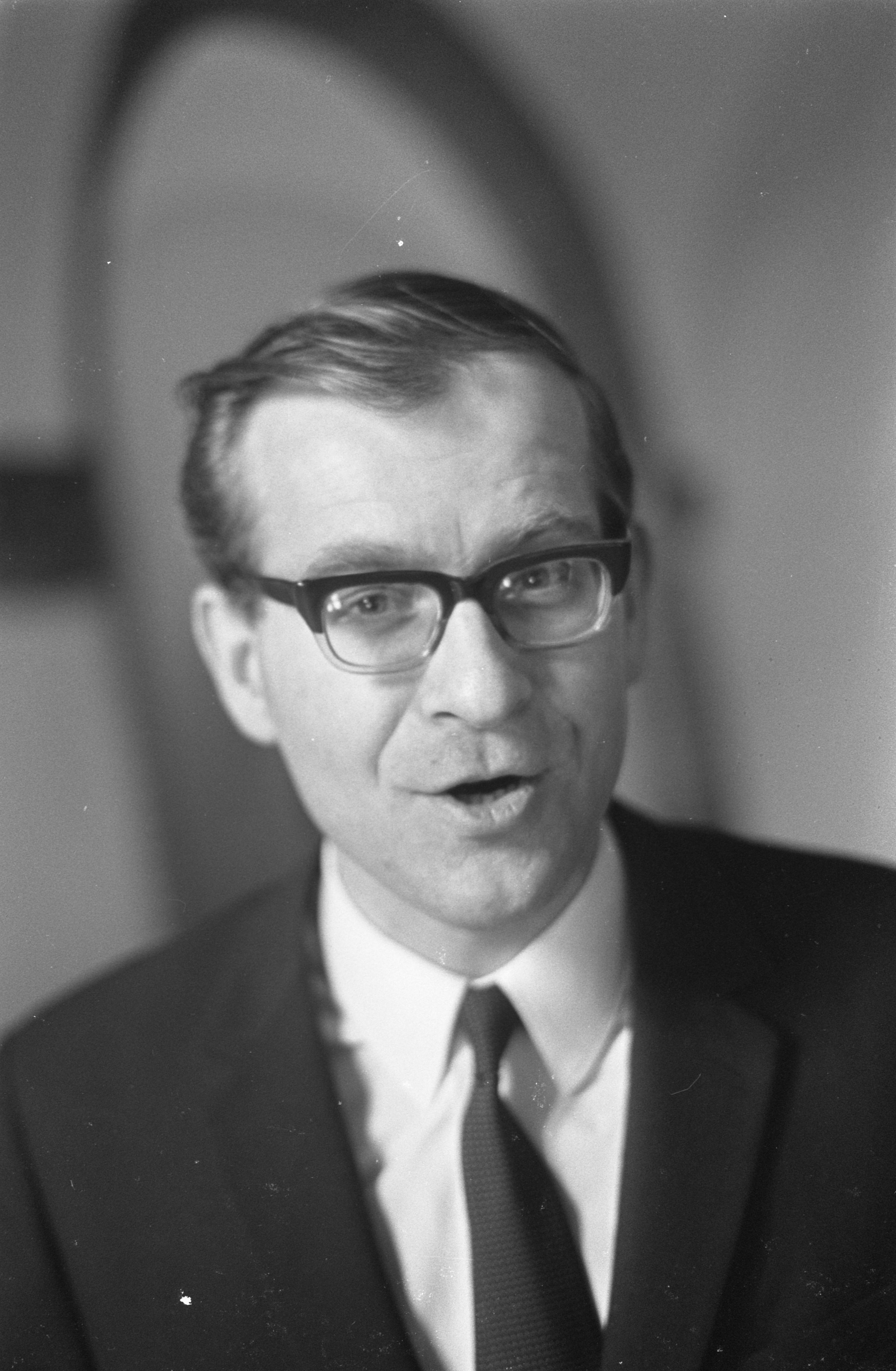
- Huub Oosterhuis in 1969
- Written: 1965
- Text: by Huub Oosterhuis
- Language: Dutch
- Melody: Flemish folk song
- Composed: 1856

"Wie als een God wil leven" (Whoever wants to live like God) is a Christian hymn with Dutch text by Huub Oosterhuis. The melody was taken from a collection edited by Edmond de Coussemaker in 1856. It has appeared in hymnals in Dutch and German.

== History ==
Oosterhuis wrote the lyrics in 1965, the year he began serving as a priest of the Amsterdamse Studentenekklesia, then a Catholic student parish. He combined the text with a tune from Edmond de Coussemaker's collection Chansons populaires des Flamands de France (1856) and published it in 1970 as an independent hymn. It has been published thenceforth in several hymnals.

== Text and theme ==
Oosterhuis wrote the text in five stanzas of three lines each. It opens with the provocative image of living like God. The text is based on biblical sources, Mark 4:1–32, the Parable of the Sower, on John 12:24–25, and on 1 Corinthians 15:35–49. Based on John, the wheat kernel that has to die in order to sprout is compared to human life and death, concluding that people have to live and even die for each other. The final stanza says that God took the same way of self-sacrifice, becoming life "for you and me".

== Music ==
The traditional melody is in a triple metre and a minor key. It uses a range of only five notes.

In addition to the melody first connected to the text, Tom Löwenthal composed a new melody and choral setting which was recorded conducted by him. Another melody was written by G. Bendrix.

== Translations ==
In 1969, Johannes Bergsma translated the song into German under the title "Wer leben will wie Gott auf dieser Erde". It was included in the German Catholic hymnal Gotteslob of 1975 as GL 183. The song was again published in the 2013 edition as GL 460. It is part of regional sections of the Protestant hymnal of 1995 Evangelisches Gesangbuch. With its general theme, it has been recommended by the Catholic Church for Lent, penitence, the Holy Week, All Souls' Day, and following (Nachfolge). It has been listed among hymns in German successful with young people.
