= Herr, unser Herr, wie bist du zugegen =

1973 song

- Christian hymn
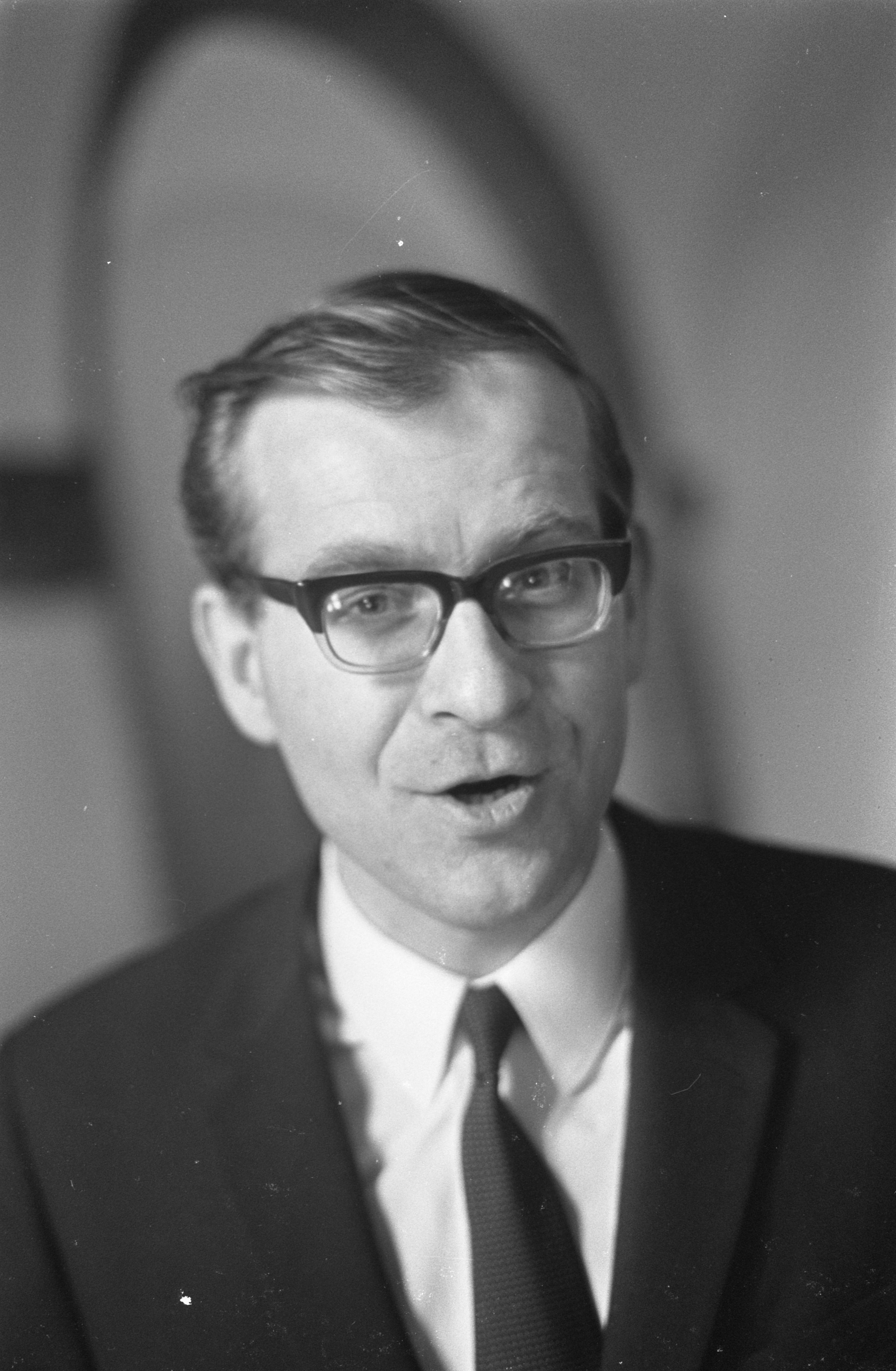
- Huub Oosterhuis in 1969
- Written: 1965/1969
- Text: translating Huub Oosterhuis
- Language: German
- Meter: 10 9 10 8
- Melody: traditional Dutch
- Published: 1975

"Herr, unser Herr, wie bist du zugegen" (Lord, our Lord, how present you are) is a Christian hymn with German text, translated in 1969 from a 1965 Dutch hymn by Huub Oosterhuis, "Heer, onze Heer". The song, of the genre Neues Geistliches Lied (NGL), appeared from 1975 in German hymnals.

== History ==
In the 1960s Oosterhuis was a Catholic priest in Amsterdam in a parish of students. The group was interested in a renewal of the language in the liturgy, both sung and spoken. Inspired by the Second Vatican Council, their service was primarily a meeting of people, intending to serve and proclaim Biblical words. Oosterhuis wrote the hymn text as "Heer, onze Heer" in 1965, based on several biblical themes. He titled it "Lied van Gods aanwezigheid" (song of God's presence). His songs are, like the psalms, "tentative approaches to answer questions of God and man" (tastende Versuche, die Frage nach Gott und dem Menschen zu beantworten).

The melody is a traditional Dutch melody which Bernard Huijbers set. The translation to German was made by Peter Pawlowsky and Nikolaus Greitemann in 1969. The hymn was included in the first common German Catholic hymnal Gotteslob of 1975 as GL 298. Intentions to ban his songs from the 2013 edition, because Oosterhuis and his parish had left the Catholic Church, were met with protests from German parishes, and five of his songs were retained. "Herr, unser Herr, wie bist du zugegen" was included as GL 414, in the section "Leben in Gott – Vertrauen und Trost" (life in God – trust and solace). It is also part of other songbooks, including ecumenical collections.

Oosterhuis received an ecumenical German sermon prize in 2014 for his life's work, in recognition of the great influence of his hymns in German parishes.

== Text, theme and melody ==
The text, in five stanzas of four lines each, is written in the first person plural ("we"), from the point of view of a group of singers, addressing God as "du" (you). It reflects the presence of God, who is experienced as unspeakably close but hidden at the same time. In the final stanza, God's presence is seen in all persons on Earth. He is requested to keep caring about them until an ultimate completion in him (bis wir in dir vollkommen sind).

The melody is taken from a Dutch 16th century song about lovesickness Bedroefde herteken ("Afflicted hearts").
