= Ik sta voor U in leegte en gemis =

1966 song

- Christian hymn
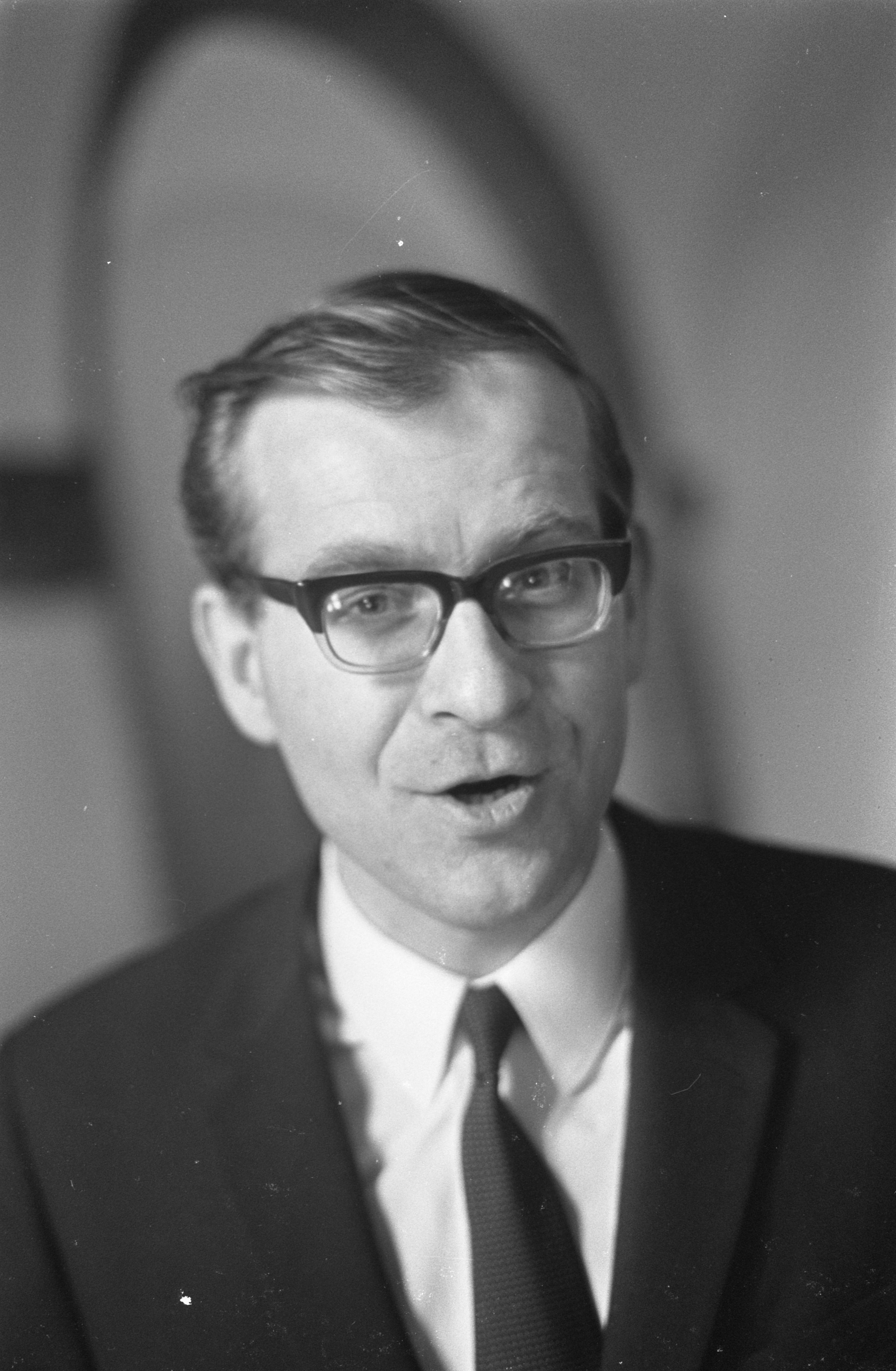
- Huub Oosterhuis in 1969
- Written: 1966
- Text: Huub Oosterhuis
- Language: Dutch
- Meter: 10 11 10 11 10 11
- Melody: Bernard Huijbers
- Composed: 1961
- Published: 1968

"Ik sta voor U in leegte en gemis" (I stand before You in emptiness and loss) is a Christian hymn with Dutch text by Huub Oosterhuis. The melody was composed by Bernard Huijbers.

== History ==
Huub Oosterhuis wrote the lyrics in 1966 for the funeral service of a 26-year-old man, a student and member of the Amsterdamse Studentenekklesia (a then Roman Catholic student parish), in which Oosterhuis had been serving as priest since 1965. In 1968 it was first published as part of a popular-speech funeral liturgy, and in 1970 as an independent hymn.

In 1983, Oosterhuis made a minor change to the text in an effort for an inclusive language: in the third stanza, he replaced the word zoon (sons) by mens (people).

== Text and theme ==
Oosterhuis wrote the text in three stanzas of six lines each, based on several biblical themes.

The text, written in the first person, is focused on an attitude of empty hands, limited knowledge and understanding, and many questions. In the second stanza, the old promises, such as being rescued from exile, are compared to the present situation, of doubt, feeling helpless, and caught in inability to change. The last stanza asks God to speak the words that console and make free, leading to a great peace. The final words are: You are my breath, when I pray to you.

== Music ==
Although in many hymnals and songbooks the date of origin for both the lyrics and the tune is erroneously stated as 1964, which might lead to the false conclusion that the tune was composed to Oosterhuis' lyrics, the music is in fact older. Dutch composer and priest Bernard Huijbers had composed it in 1961 as an alternative to the tune for Psalm 119 as conveyed in the Genevan Psalter (1551 edition). He underlaid it to the last three stanzas of the Psalm in the version of the Dutch team of authors Het landvolk, resulting in a new song titled Een smekeling, zo kom ik tot uw troon. Huub Oosterhuis wrote several hymns to Huijbers' tune, starting with Zo vriendelijk en veilig als het licht (1964) and De Heer heeft mij gezien en onverwacht (1966). After Ik sta voor U he wrote another five hymns to the tune, among them De woorden die wij spraken tot elkaar for the celebration of the 60th birthday of Queen Beatrix (1998).

In some songbooks, the melody is reprinted without bar lines, moving evenly in free flow, with longer notes only at the end of each long line. This notation is reasonable to avoid false emphases at the end of the lines, but is not authorized by the composer, who repeatedly objected to changes of his original notation. The melody has been described as "plain and brittle" ("schlicht und spröde"), supporting the insecure attitude of the singer.

== Translations ==
In 1973, Lothar Zenetti translated the song into German under the title "Ich steh vor dir mit leeren Händen, Herr" (I stand before you with empty hands, Lord). Zenetti's translation first appeared in 1974, and then from 1975 in German hymnals. It was included in the German Catholic hymnal Gotteslob of 1975 as GL 621. The song was again published in the 2013 edition as GL 422. It was also printed in the Protestant hymnal of 1995 Evangelisches Gesangbuch, as EG 382. A text change for an inclusive language similar to that in the Dutch original was introduced by changing the phrase "unter deinen Söhnen" (amongst your sons) to "unter deinen Kindern" (amongst your children). It was first printed in 1995 the Evangelisches Gesangbuch, and from 1996 onwards in reprints of the Gotteslob of 1975.

Other German translations of the song were written by Peter Pawlowsky (1976), Alex Stock (1987) and Jürgen Henkys (1994/1998). Although being closer to Oosterhuis' original, they were not able to replace Zenetti's version.

An English translation titled I stand before you empty-handed, Lord by Hedwig T. Durnbaugh (stanzas 1 and 3) and Alan Luff (stanza 2) has been commissioned by the Internationale Arbeitsgemeinschaft für Hymnologie (IAH) and included in the multilingual hymnal Colours of Grace (2006).
