= Johannes Krahn =

German architect (1908–1974)

- Johannes Krahn, in c. 1953
- Born: 17 May 1908; Mainz, German Empire
- Died: 17 October 1974 (aged 66); Orselina, Switzerland
- Education: Technische Lehranstalten Offenbach
- Occupations: Architect; Academic teacher
- Organizations: Kunstgewerbeschule Aachen; Städelschule
- Awards: Akademie der Künste

Johannes Krahn (17 May 1908 – 17 October 1974) was a German architect and an academic teacher.

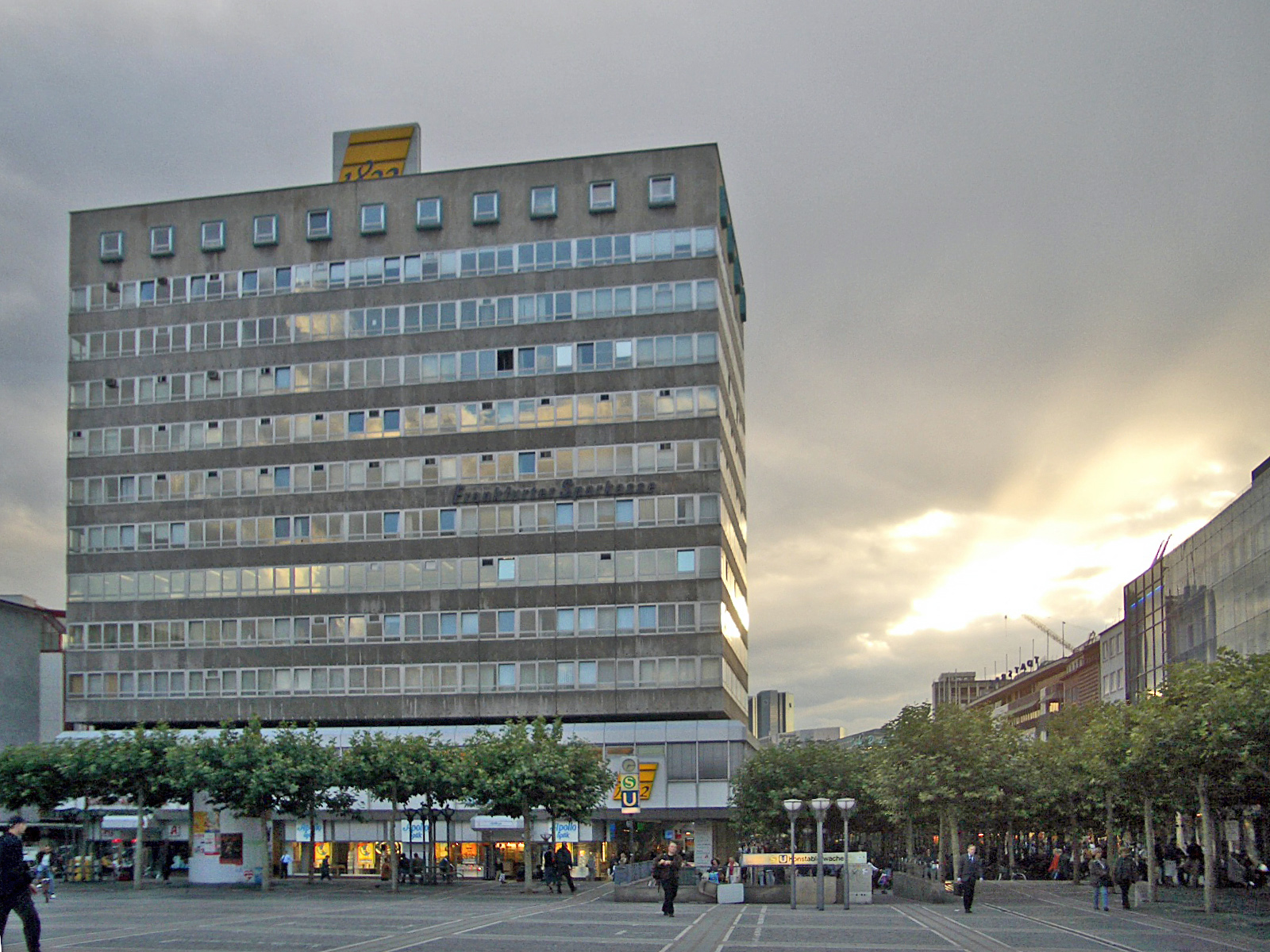
Bienenkorbhaus, Frankfurt (1954) in 2004

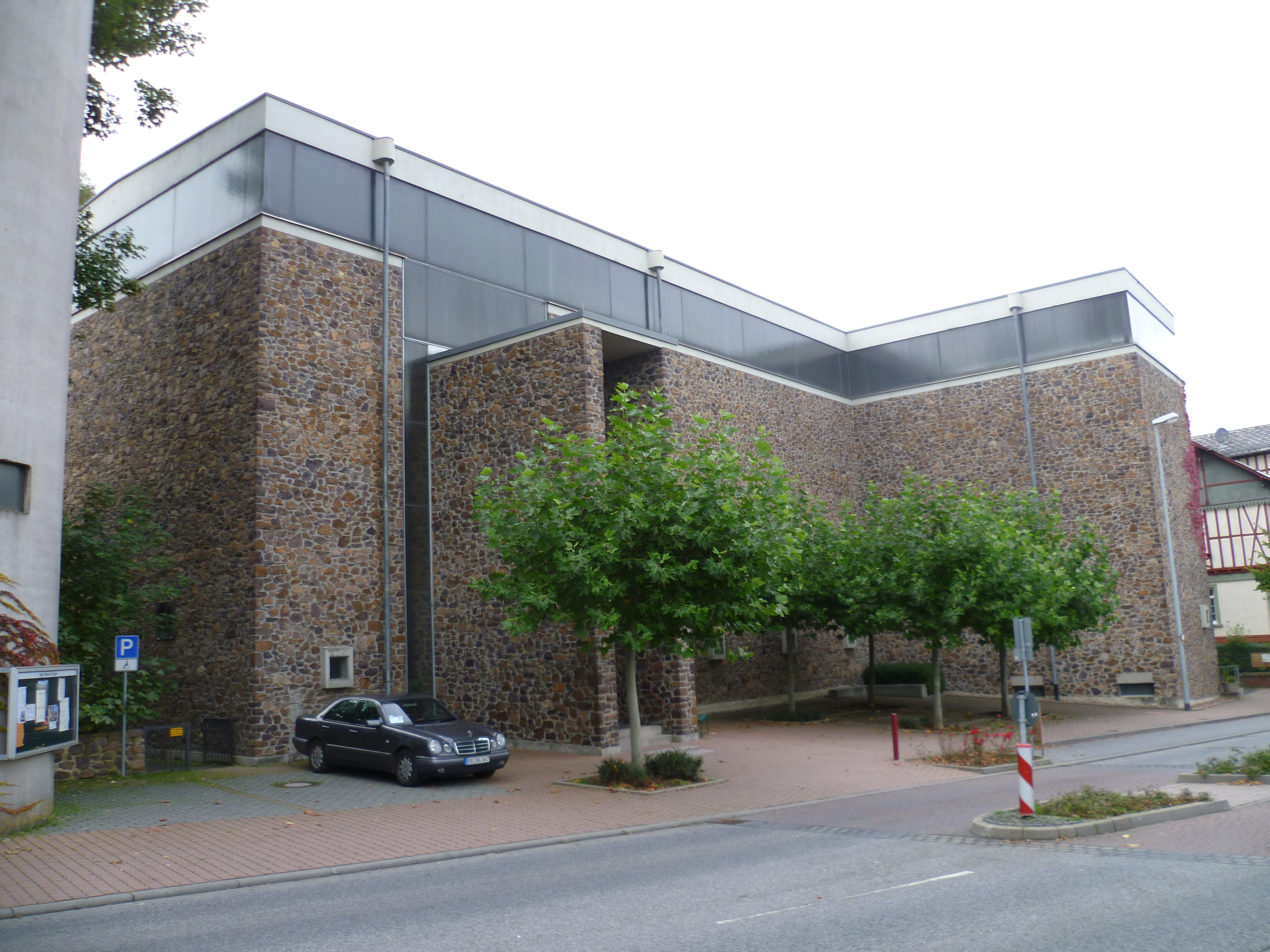
St. Martin, Idstein (1965) in 2010

== Career ==
Born in Mainz, Johannes Krahn studied architecture from 1923 to 1927 at the Technische Lehranstalten Offenbach. He continued his studies 1927 to 1928 at the Kölner Werkschulen as Meisterschüler of Dominikus Böhm, who interested him in building churches. Krahn worked with Rudolf Schwarz from 1928 to 1940. He graduated as a civil engineer at the RWTH Aachen University.

In Frankfurt he was in charge of the rebuilding after World War II of the Paulskirche, starting in 1947, later he was on the team to rebuild the Städel. In 1950 he built the French Embassy in Bad Godesberg. In 1954 he completed at the Konstablerwache in Frankfurt the early skyscraper Bienenkorbhaus (Beehive House). His church building St. Wendel, Frankfurt (1957) has been compared to Le Corbusier in terms of materials and flow of light. In 1962 he built the St. Nikolaus von Flüe Catholic church in Wörsdorf. In 1965 Krahn created a variation on the interplay of stonemasonry, glass and concrete of St. Wendel in St. Martin, Idstein. In 1966 he built St. Sebastian in Frankfurt. In 1973 he built the City-Hochhaus in Frankfurt, together with Richard Heil. Among his last projects was in 1974 the design of St. Aegidius in Bonn-Buschdorf, realized after his death by his son Johannes Krahn in the firm Krahn-Lorenz-Sauer, Frankfurt am Main, in 1978 to 1980. He died in Orselina, Switzerland.

Krahn was a teacher at the Kunstgewerbeschule Aachen and since 1954 a professor of architecture at the Städelschule Frankfurt. He was the director of the Städelschule from 1965 to 1970. With dedication to detail, he stressed function, construction and material, and refrained from pure ornament.

== Awards ==
- 1955 Member of the Akademie der Künste, Berlin
- 1951 Gold medal for the Krahn-Stuhl (Krahn chair) at the 9th Triennale di Milano

== Literature ==
- Dannien-Maassen, Hanna (1991). "Johannes Krahn (1908–1974). Kirchenbau zwischen Tradition und Moderne". Jahrbuch für Architektur (in German): 265–269. ISSN 0942-7481.
