= O Licht der wunderbaren Nacht =

Roman Catholic Easter hymn

- Christian Easter hymn
- Occasion: Easter
- Written: 1963
- Text: by Georg Thurmair
- Language: German
- Melody: from Mainz
- Composed: c. 1390
- Published: 1975

"O Licht der wunderbaren Nacht" (O light of the wonderful night) is a Christian Easter hymn by Georg Thurmair written in 1963. It was part of the German Catholic hymnal Gotteslob of 1975 as GL 208, with a melody from the 14th century. It is part of the second edition of the Gotteslob as GL 334, also of regional sections of the Protestant hymnal Evangelisches Gesangbuch.

== History ==
Thurmair, a publisher of the 1938 ecumenical hymnal Kirchenlied, wrote the text "O Licht der wunderbaren Nacht" in 1963. It became part of the first common Catholic hymnal Gotteslob of 1975 as GL 208, combined with a melody from Mainz dated to the 1390s. In the second edition of the Gotteslob in 2013, it was included as GL 334 in the Easter section. The hymn is suitable for Easter Vigil and was recommended by Kirche+Leben, the newspaper of the Roman Catholic Diocese of Münster, for celebrating the holiday at home in 2020, when services were cancelled due to the COVID-19 pandemic.

"O Licht der wunderbaren Nacht" was included in the regional sections for Thuringia and Bavaria of the Protestant hymnal Evangelisches Gesangbuch, as EG 559.

== Text and melody ==
"O Licht der wunderbaren Nacht" is in three stanzas. The bar form has a Stollen ("AB") of two lines, and an Abgesang of three lines, the first two rhyming ("CC"), the final one standing alone ("D"), creating a ABABCCD pattern.

All three stanzas begin addressing the light, first of the wonderful, or miraculous, night, then the light of bright eternity ("der lichten Ewigkeit", finally much brighter than any day (viel lichter als der Tag). The last line offers a concluding statement, in the first stanza "der Wahrheit Licht ind Leben" (Light and life of truth), in the second "uns leuchten lässt in Gnaden" (makes us shine in grace), finally "voll Freuden und voll Frieden" (full of joys and full of peace).

The hymn tune from the 1390s to which the song is set, was notably associated with "Es ist das Heil uns kommen her" in 1523.
