= Fulbert of Chartres =

French Christian bishop, died 1028 CE

Saint Fulbert of Chartres
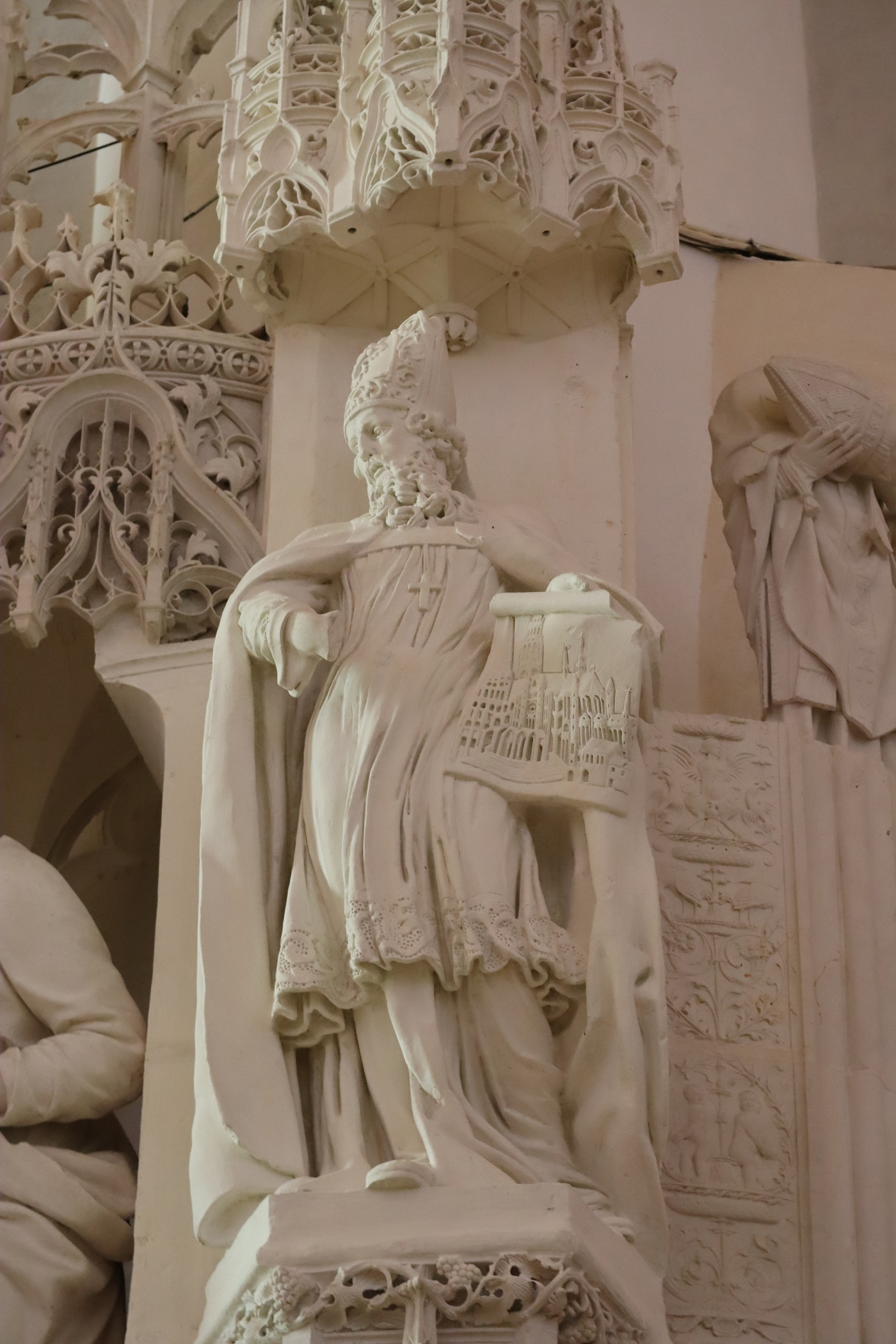
- Statue of Fulbert in Chartres Cathedral

Bishop of Chartres
- Born: 952–970
- Died: 10 April 1028
- Venerated in: Roman Catholic Church; Eastern Orthodox Church
- Feast: 10 April
- Controversy: Fulbert was never canonized, but permission was granted by Rome to celebrate his day in Chartres and Poitiers

Fulbert of Chartres (French: Fulbert de Chartres; 952–970–10 April 1028) was the Bishop of Chartres from 1006 to 1028 and a teacher at the Cathedral school there. Fulbert may have been a pupil of Gerbert of Aurillac, who would later become Pope Sylvester II. He was responsible for the advancement of the Nativity of the Virgin's feast day on September 8 and for one of the many reconstructions of the Chartres Cathedral. Most of the information available about him comes from letters he wrote to secular and religious figures between 1004 and 1028.

== Life ==
There is no conclusive evidence as to the exact date or location of Fulbert's birth; sources vary in listing dates from 952 to 970. As to his place of birth, most sources suggest northern France, possibly Picardy, although some say northern Italy. Sources do agree, however, that he was of humble birth. Information from several sources places him at the cathedral school in Rheims in the 980s, where one of his fellow students was the future King Robert II (the Pious) of France. In the early to mid-990s, Fulbert arrived at the cathedral school there. His position is variously described as schoolmaster or assistant. He also assumed some minor ecclesiastical roles in the cathedral but was not a monk. In 1004, he became a deacon, and in 1006 was appointed Bishop of Chartres, a position he maintained until his death on 10 April 1028 or 1029. Again, sources vary, but the majority seem to settle on 1028. There is some dispute over Fulbert's sainthood, which arises from his contemporaries describing him as having a "saintly nature", a description which continued to be used by others after his death. Fulbert was never officially canonized by the Church, but permission was given by Rome for the dioceses of Chartres and Poitiers to celebrate his life on 10 April.

His feast is included in Martyrologium Romanum (2004) on 10 April.

It has been asserted that he was a disciple of Gerbert of Aurillac, but the matter has raised controversy.

== Writings ==
=== Letters ===
Letters constitute the bulk of writings that can be verifiably attributed to Fulbert. His most famous letter was to Duke William V of Aquitaine on the duties of feudal lord and vassal. He also wrote to fellow churchmen on a variety of liturgical issues including the appointment of bishops, excommunication, and obedience. His letters also include correspondence about mundane issues of everyday life such as thanking people for medicine and setting up meetings. These letters provide insight into a variety of issues in the late tenth and early eleventh century France.

=== Poems ===
Fulbert wrote approximately twenty-four poems which have sometimes been described as humorous, such as his poem about the monk in the desert, or lovely, as when describing his “Ode to the Nightingale”.

=== Hymns ===
Most of Fulbert's hymns were written to glorify the Virgin. He also wrote “Chorus Novae Jerusalem” (Ye Choirs of New Jerusalem), to be sung at Easter services.

=== Sermons ===
Fulbert's most famous sermon is “Approbate Consuetudinis”, in which he provides information regarding the importance of the celebration of the “Feast of Mary’s Nativity”.

== Theological contributions ==
Like the recent millennium change, the one during Fulbert's lifetime also created a fear of the end of the world. The veneration of the Virgin Mary was already established in the Church, and Fulbert used this to teach her importance. The results were twofold, it helped to ease people's fears and greatly expanded the Marian Cult and Chartres's position in it. Chartres was already involved due to its being the holder of a sacred relic of Mary's, the “Sancta Camisia”, (Holy Tunic), which has been variously described as being worn by Mary during the Annunciation or during the birth of Christ. This tunic was already the subject of a miracle because of its use by an earlier bishop of Chartres, Gauscelinus, in 911 to ward off the invading Normans. Fulbert expanded on the theme of miracles involving Mary, especially those cases where she had interceded between sinners and God. In this way people could pray for Mary's intercession with God on their behalf in the perceived coming apocalypse. Fulbert himself was involved in one of these miracles; when he was gravely ill Mary had healed him with a drop of milk because of his devotion to her. This also served to give Mary the image of not only the mother of Christ, but for all who believed in her, their mother too. All of this led to Fulbert's ultimate goal of promoting a special feast day to celebrate Mary's Nativity.

To gain popular support for this feast, Fulbert wrote his famous sermon “Approbate Consuetudinis” in which he relates Mary's miracles. He also brings in the evidence of Mary's family lineage, which the Bible traces back to King David. In his sermon Fulbert used the symbolism of the “Stirps Jesse” (Tree of Jesse) to help explain Mary's familial relationship to the great men of the past and how it was determined, as described in Scripture, that she would be the one to whom Christ would be born. This again served to enhance her importance to the world and convince people of the need to celebrate her birth. This sermon led to a number of liturgical changes throughout the next few centuries in Europe. The sermon itself, or variations of it, and the chants associated with it, became part of the service for the feast day of Mary's Nativity on Sept. 8. By promoting the Feast day of Mary's Nativity, Fulbert was able to advance the importance of Mary and therefore the cult of her veneration grew. This in turn enhanced the importance of the Cathedral of Chartres as a centre for Marian devotion, and also gave people a spiritual symbol to turn to in times of need at the turn of the millennium.

== Ecclesiastical reform ==
During his time in Chartres Fulbert played an important role in the development and spread of the ideas that led to the Gregorian church reforms of the eleventh century under Pope Gregory VII. These reforms concerned the division between the powers of church and state, especially in the appointment of new abbots and bishops. In the eleventh century the secular rulers had a habit of appointing whomever they wanted to fill vacant church positions. Fulbert and some of his students, such as Abbot Albert of Marmoutier, routinely wrote that it was up to the clergy and the citizens of the diocese involved to elect a replacement, the authority being found in the rulings of the First Council of Nicaea (325) and the Council of Antioch (264-272). These reforms also stated that the Church, not the state, was responsible for disciplining the clergy. The issues of simony (the buying of church offices) and immoral clerics were also addressed by Fulbert. Although the reforms were issued by Gregory VII, some of its ideas came from Fulbert, whose writings were disseminated through his students.

== Architectural contributions ==
After Chartres Cathedral burned in 1020, Fulbert devoted his energies to raising funds for its rebuilding, which was completed in 1037, nine years after his death. In 1194 the cathedral was again almost completely destroyed by fire; only the crypt, some of the west facade and two towers remained. The crypt has been incorporated into all subsequent reconstructions. The construction of the Gothic-style cathedral that stands to-day began afterward. It is in this cathedral that we see Fulbert's influences that resulted from his promotion of the Feast day of Mary's Nativity and the cult of the Virgin Mary. The sculptures around the three portals depict the life of Mary, who is the central figure in the Royal Portal. One of the cathedral's stained glass windows depicts the Tree of Jesse, which traces Mary's family and the Holy Family, again a reference to Fulbert's teachings in regards to the Feast of Mary's Nativity.

== Bibliography ==
- Behrends, Frederick, ed. (1976). The Letters and Poems of Fulbert of Chartres. Oxford: The Clarendon Press.
- Committee of the General Synod, compilers (1962). The Book of Common Praise; Being the Hymn Book of the Anglican Church of Canada. Toronto: Oxford University Press.
- Delaporte, Yves (1957). "Fulbert de Chartres et l'école chartraine de chant liturgique au Xie siècle". Études grégoriennes. 2: 51–81.
- Fassler, Margot (2000). "Mary's Nativity, Fulbert of Chartres, and the Stirps Jesse: Liturgical Innovation Circa 1000 and its Afterlife". Speculum. 75: 389–434.
- Frankl, Paul (1957). "The Chronology of Chartres Cathedral". The Art Bulletin. 39: 33–47.
- Hallam, Elizabeth (1980). Capetian France 987–1328. London: Longman.
- Hilberry, Harry H. (1959). "The Cathedral at Chartres in 1030". Speculum. 34: 561–572.
- Mac Kinney, Loren C. (1957). Bishop Fulbert and Education at The School of Chartres. Notre Dame: The Mediaeval Institute University of Notre Dame.
- Nemerkényi, Elöd. "Latin Grammar in the Cathedral School: Fulbert of Chartres, Bonipert of Pécs, and the Way of a Lost Priscian Manuscript". Quidditas: Journal of the Rocky Mountain Medieval and Renaissance Association. 22 (201): 39–54.
- Ott, Michael (1909). "Fulbert of Chartres". The Catholic Encyclopedia. Vol. 6. New York: Robert Appleton.
- Peters, Edward (1990). "The Death of the Subdean: Ecclesiastical Order and Disorder in Eleventh-Century Francia". In Bachrach, Bernard S.; Nicholas, David (eds.). Law, Custom, and the Social Fabric in Medieval Europe: Essays in Honor of Bryce Lyon. Kalamazoo Michigan: Western Michigan University. pp. 51–71.
- Schulman, Jana K., ed. (2002). "Fulbert of Chartres". The Rise of the Medieval World 500-1300: A Biographical Dictionary. Westport Conn.: Greenwood Press. pp. 152–3.
- Spitzer, Laura (1994). "The Cult of the Virgin Mary and Gothic Sculpture: Evaluating Opposition in the Chartres West Facade Capital Frieze". Gesta. 33: 132–150.
- Thurston, Herbert S. J.; Attwater, Donald, eds. (1963). Butler's Lives of the Saints (Complete ed.). New York: P. J. Kenedy and Sons. pp. 63–64.
- Warren, F. M. (1908). "The Presidents Address: A Plea for the Study of Medieval Latin". PMLA. 23 (Appendix). Proceedings of the Twenty-Sixth Annual Meeting of the Modern Language Association of America 1908: xlvii–lxxii.
- Wellman, Tennyson (2002). "Apocalyptic Concerns and Mariological Tactics in Eleventh-Century France". In Frassetto, Michael (ed.). The Year 1000; Religious and Social Response to the Turning of the First Millennium. New York: Palgrave Macmillan. pp. 133–163.
- Ziezulewicz, William (1991). "The School of Chartres and Reform Influences Before the Pontificate of Leo IX". The Catholic Historical Review. 77: 383–402.
