= Huub Oosterhuis =

Dutch theologian and poet (1933–2023)

The Reverend Huub Oosterhuis
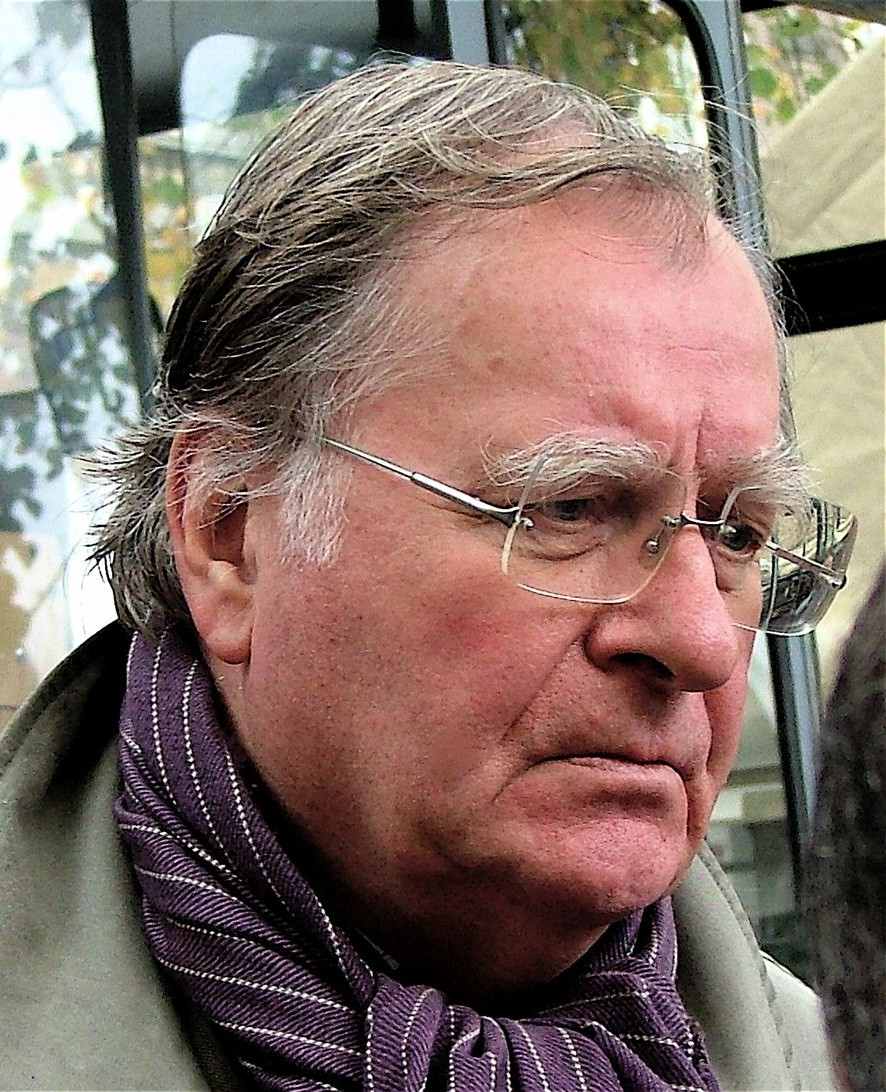
- Oosterhuis in 2006
- Born: Hubertus Gerardus Josephus Henricus Oosterhuis; 1 November 1933; Amsterdam, Netherlands
- Died: 9 April 2023 (aged 89); Amsterdam, Netherlands
- Occupations: Theologian; poet; hymnwriter; translator
- Writing career
- Period: 1961–2023
- Genres: Liturgy; religious poetry
- Subjects: Bible; socialism
- Notable work: Liedboek voor de Kerken (1973)

Hubertus Gerardus Josephus Henricus "Huub" Oosterhuis (Dutch pronunciation: [ˈhyp ˈoːstərhœys]; 1 November 1933 – 9 April 2023) was a Dutch theologian and poet. He is mainly known for his contribution to Christian music and liturgy in Dutch and also in German, used in both Protestant and Catholic churches. He authored over 60 books and over 700 hymns, songs, psalms (often in an own interpretation), and prayers. Several of his songs were translated, and he received international awards and recognition.

== Life and career ==
Oosterhuis was born on 1 November 1933 in Amsterdam. He attended a high school there and joined the Society of Jesus in 1954. He was ordained as a priest at the Basilica of Saint Servatius in Maastricht in 1964.

From 1954, inspired by Che Guevara who said that churches have the potential to transform the social structure of society, Oosterhuis combined his religious position with political activism.

In 1965, Oosterhuis was appointed priest of the student parish in Amsterdam, Studentenekklesia. He became one of the major supporters of ecumenism, following the modernist interpretation of the Second Vatican Council. He started out to rewrite the liturgy and make it acceptable to all. Some of his changes were considered controversial within the Roman Catholic Church especially writing the prayer for agnostics: "Heer, als U bestaat, kom dan onder ons" ("Lord, if You exist, come amongst us"). A few songs have been censored in some dioceses.

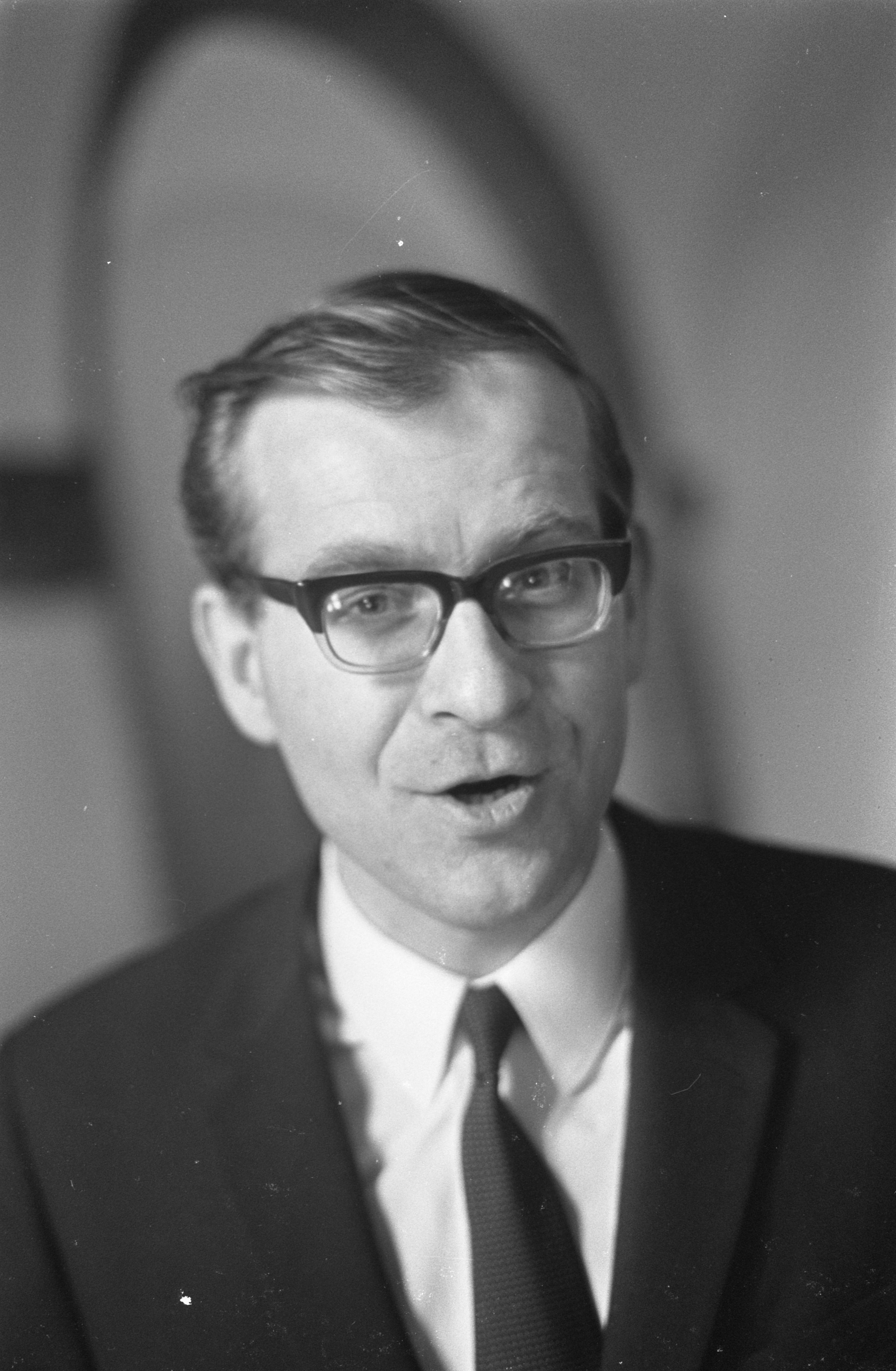
Oosterhuis in 1969

His political views, conflicts regarding the liturgy, and unorthodox views regarding priestly celibacy led to Oosterhuis being dismissed from the Jesuit order and defrocked by the Bishop of Harlem Theodorus Zwartkruis in 1969. He left the Catholic Church and functioned as an Independent Catholic priest, in charge of a church in Amsterdam, for about forty years. He remained focused on writing liturgy, poetry and essays.

In the 1960s and 1970s, his liturgical texts were put to music by his fellow former Jesuit Bernard Huijbers (1922–2003). When this co-operation between Oosterhuis and Huijbers ended, Huijbers engaged himself more and more in a "spirituality-without-God" or "- without-Thou", while Oosterhuis kept to his biblical prayers, hymns, and psalms. After they split up and Huijbers moved to the south of France, Oosterhuis's main composers were two of Huijbers' pupils, Antoine Oomen and Tom Löwenthal.

Oosterhuis founded "De Rode Hoed" ("The Red Hat"), a discussion centre in Amsterdam in 1990, for his student organisation, and was its director until 1998.

=== Personal life ===
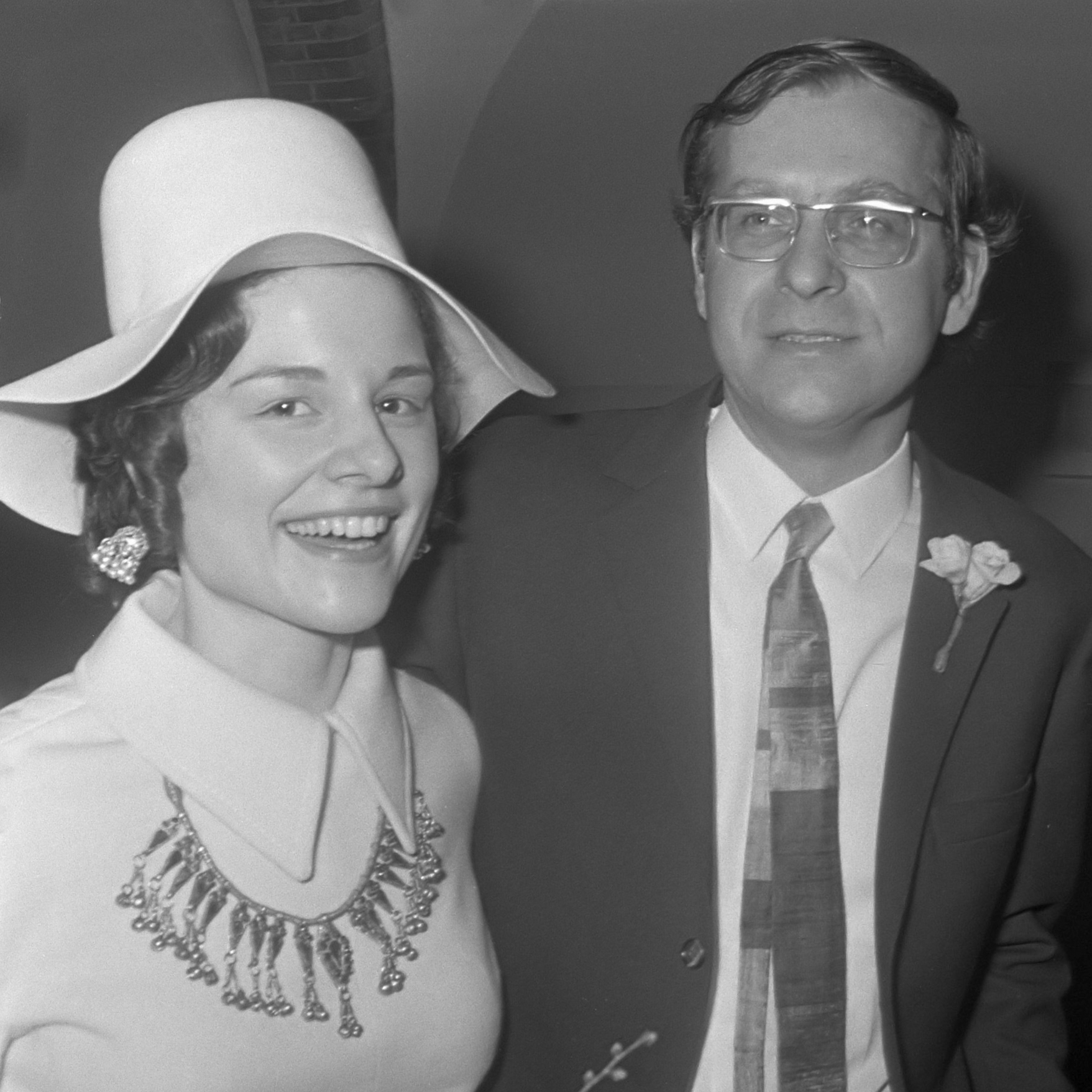
Oosterhuis and Josefien Melief in 1970

In 1970, Oosterhuis married nurse and violist Jozefien Melief. They had two children, Trijntje Oosterhuis and Tjeerd Oosterhuis, who both became musicians. They divorced, and he married a second time.

Oosterhuis died on 9 April 2023, at age 89, after a short illness.

Walter Meinrad, a German theologian and musicologist, thinks that the songs by Oosterhuis will leave a lasting impression because they serve no fashion but touch existential human conditions and express tensions such as life and death, doubt and insecurities. Like psalms and other great hymns, his texts show "a sense for the overtones of helplessness, lament and the unfinished" ("ein Gespür für die Obertöne des Unvermögens, der Klage, des Unfertigen").

== Work ==
Oosterhuis wrote over 60 books and more than 700 hymns, songs, psalms (often in an own interpretation), and prayers. Many songs are part of the hymnal Liedboek voor de Kerken. His poetry was not valued in the same way; Gerrit Komrij, editor of an influential anthology of Dutch poetry, referred to him as "the firm Christ & Co.", and did not include a single poem of Oosterhuis's in his anthology.

In 2002, Queen Beatrix of the Netherlands asked Oosterhuis to deliver the eulogy at the funeral of her husband, Prince-Consort Claus von Amsberg, a longtime personal friend, in the New Church in Delft: Claus and Oosterhuis had first met in 1968 and he visited the royal family regularly. That same week, the Protestant VU University in Amsterdam granted Oosterhuis an honorary doctorate in theology. Herman Amelink noted in NRC Handelsblad after Oosterhuis died that this should have been done by a Catholic university, but that his history with the Catholic church probably disallowed this—and that the church had further distanced itself from Oosterhuis in 2000 by scrapping all of Oosterhuis's songs from a new edition of the songbook for the Roermond diocese.

At De Rode Hoed, André van der Louw announced his Social Democratic Renewal Program, an incentive to reform the Labour Party. Oosterhuis ultimately chose the less-known Socialist Party, as he viewed it as being closer to socialist ideals. He said that "The Socialist Party is closer to the social ethics of the Bible than many Christian parties." He had joined the Socialist Party in 1999, and in the 2006 elections Oosterhuis stood for the party as the final candidate, a symbolic position. After his death in 2023, the party published an in memoriam on their website, saying his inspiration continues to live in the party.

Oosterhuis made a translation of the Torah together with Alex van Heusden, which was released in five separate books, as an attempt to translate the first five books of the Bible as closely to contemporary Dutch as possible without losing the style of the original Hebrew text.

=== Hymns ===
The first hymn by Oosterhuis was "Wie als een God wil leven", in 1965. It was translated in 1969 by Johannes Bergsma, and included in the 1975 German Catholic hymnal Gotteslob and its second edition. His song "Heer, onze Heer". written in 1965 to a traditional Dutch melody, was translated to German as "Herr, unser Herr, wie bist du zugegen" (Lord, our Lord, how present you are), and included in several hymnals and songbooks. Lothar Zenetti translated his "Ik sta voor U in leegte en gemis" to "Ich steh vor dir mit leeren Händen, Herr" (I stand before You with empty hands), which was included in German Protestant and Catholic hymnals. When the hymnal's second edition was prepared, some feared that his popular songs would be eliminated because of his dissident stance, but all five and a litany were retained.

Oosterhuis received the German ecumenical Predigtpreis (sermon award) for his life's work in 2014.

=== Translations ===
Translations into English include At Times I See, The Children of the Poor Man, and Wake Your Power (CD), and also:

- Schillebeeckx, Edward; Oosterhuis, Huub; Hoogeveen, Piet (1983). God is new each moment. Edinburgh: T. & T. Clark. ISBN 0-567-29115-4. OCLC 10578202.
- Oosterhuis, Huub (1981). Anybody, everybody. Geneva: World Council of Churches. ISBN 2-8254-0658-9. OCLC 7256665.
- ——; Smith, N. D. (1979). Times of life: prayers and poems. New York: Paulist Press. ISBN 0-8091-2245-6. OCLC 6217276.
- ——; Smith, N. D. (1971). Prayers, poems & songs. London: Sheed and Ward. ISBN 0-7220-0630-6. OCLC 16195053.
- ——; McGoldrick, Redmond; Groot, Ger (1975). At times I see. London: Sheed and Ward. ISBN 0-7220-7504-9. OCLC 16292063.
- —— (1976). Open your hearts. London: Sheed and Ward. ISBN 0-7220-7624-X. OCLC 63385924.
- ——; Beeck, Franz Jozef van (1968). Fifty psalms: an attempt at a new translation. London: Burns & Oates. ISBN 0-223-29264-8. OCLC 73054.
- —— (1968). Your word is near: contemporary Christian prayers. New York: Paulist Press. ISBN 0-8091-1775-4. OCLC 1962172.
