= Robert Campbell (advocate) =

Scottish advocate and hymn writer (1814–1868)

Robert Campbell (19 December 1814 – 29 December 1868) was a Scottish advocate and hymn writer. Brought up as a Presbyterian, he later joined the Roman Catholic Church. He translated the Latin texts of various hymns and wrote many others. He is remembered for such hymns as "At the Lamb's high feast we sing", "Come, pure hearts, in sweetest measures", "Ye Choirs of New Jerusalem" and "Ye servants of a martyr'd God" which all appeared in the first edition of Hymns Ancient & Modern in 1861.
