= Michael Schütz (composer) =

German church music artist

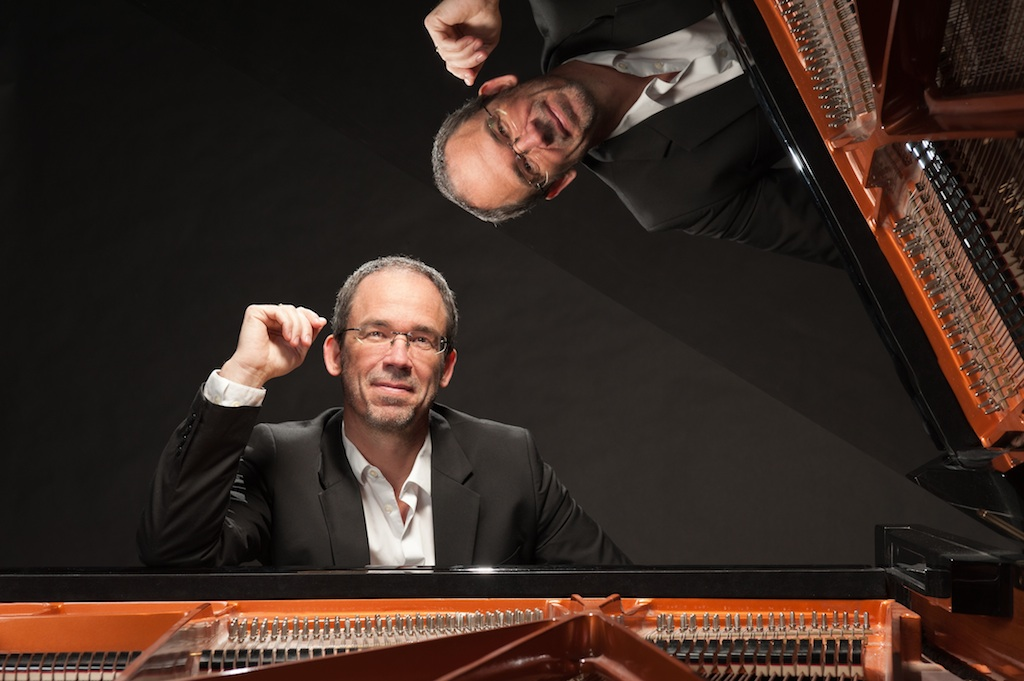
Michael Schütz, 2012

Michael Schütz (born 29 July 1963, Karlsruhe) is a German church musician, composer and university lecturer. He is especially dedicated to the connecting traditional musical styles with pop music styles, for songs of the genre Neues Geistliches Lied.

== Compositions and arrangements ==
Most of the works by Schütz were published by Strube in Munich.

- Segne dieses Kind, in Evangelisches Gesangbuch, Stuttgart, 1996
- Esslinger Orgelbuch, Carus, Stuttgart, 1996
- Gott gibt ein Fest, pop arrangements for groups in different formation, Strube, 1997
- Das ist ein köstlich Ding, pop arrangements for brass, Strube, 1999
- All Of You, pop piano book, Strube, 2001
- Down By The Riverside, spiritual for small choir, large choir, brass and band, Strube, 2001
- Gott lädt uns ein, arrangements for mixed choir, Strube, 2003
- Petrus, musical theatre for choir and band, Musisch-kulturelle Bildung, Stuttgart 2003
- The Traditional Gospel Book, 20 spirituals for choir a cappella, Strube, 2006
- The Traditional Gospel Book, 20 spiritual arrangements for piano, Strube, 2006
- The Traditional Gospel Book, 20 spirituals for choir and piano, Strube, 2006
- Welcome! Pop pieces for brass ensembles, Strube, 2007
- 20 Pop-Stücke für Orgel, Strube, 2008
- Als ob Gott selbst in uns sänge, pop arrangements for brass, band, choir and organ. Strube, 2009/2014
- I Like It Like That, 14 pop compositions for recorder and piano, Strube, 2011
- Just Michael, pop arrangements for brass, BrassOvation!, Hille, 2011
- Classic & Pop Crossover, 17 pop compositions for recorder and piano. Strube, 2012
- Vater unser, in Singt Jubilate, Strube, 2012
- Messe 2012, mass for mixed choir, string orchestra and band, Strube, 2013.
- Sein Lob wird euch entflammen. Psalmenmelodien der Reformation populär arrangiert für Bläser, Band, Chor und Orgel ad lib. (score), ISMN 979-0-9000062-0-2
