= The Grain of Wheat =

Parable of Jesus

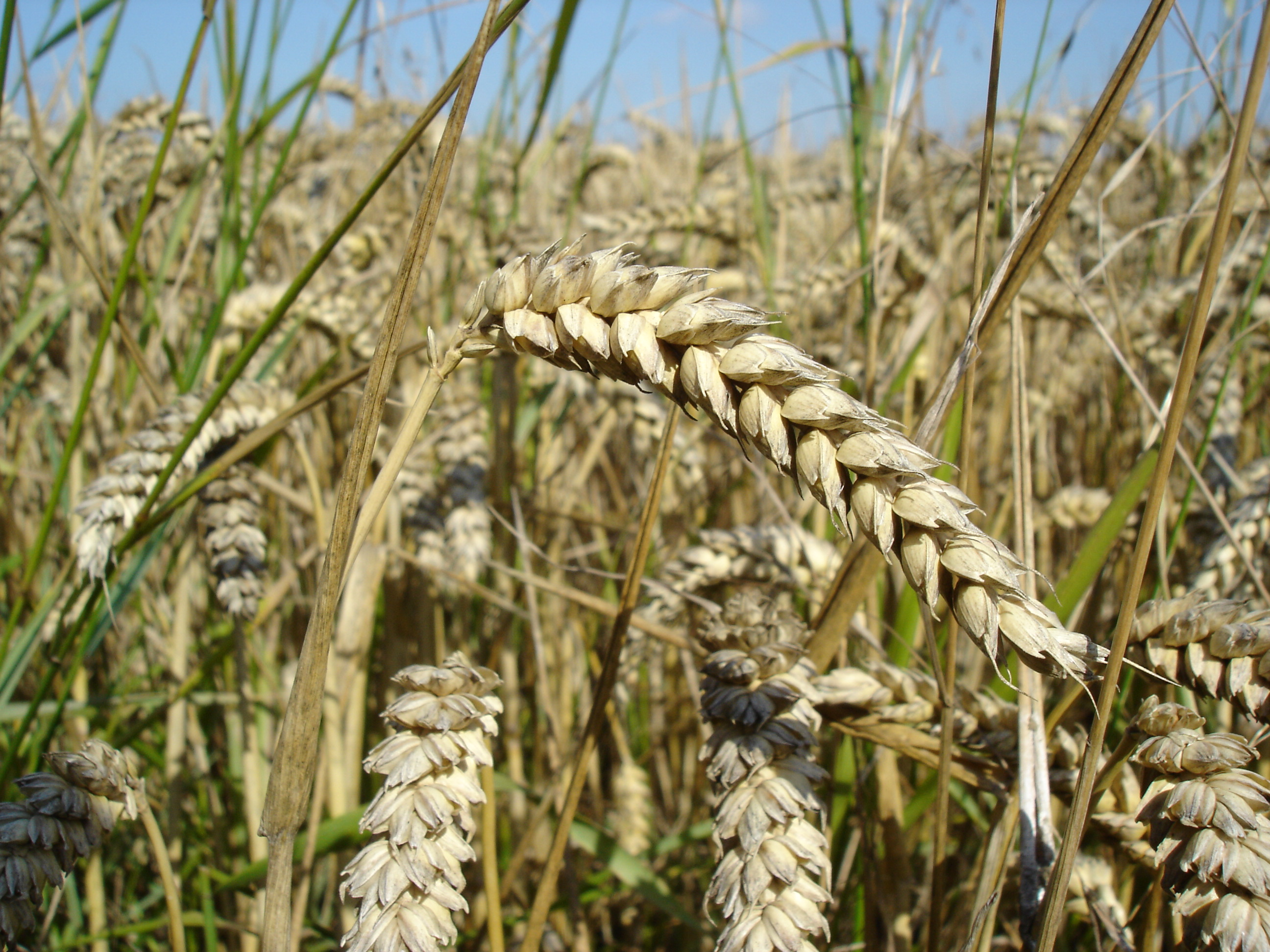
Wheat growing in a field

The parable of the Grain of Wheat (Greek: ὁ κόκκος τοῦ σῑ́του; ho kókkos toû sī́tou) is an allegory on resurrection and self-sacrifice, given by Jesus in the Gospel of John of the New Testament.

== Narrative ==
From John 12:23-26 (KJV)

And Jesus answered them, saying, The hour is come, that the Son of man should be glorified. Verily, verily, I say unto you, except a corn of wheat fall into the ground and die, it abideth alone: but if it die, it bringeth forth much fruit. He that loveth his life shall lose it; and he that hateth his life in this world shall keep it unto life eternal. If any man serve me, let him follow me; and where I am, there shall also my servant be: if any man serve me, him will my Father honour.

From the NIV:

Jesus replied, "The hour has come for the Son of Man to be glorified. Very truly I tell you, unless a kernel of wheat falls to the ground and dies, it remains only a single seed. But if it dies, it produces many seeds. Anyone who loves their life will lose it, while anyone who hates their life in this world will keep it for eternal life. Whoever serves me must follow me; and where I am, my servant also will be. My Father will honor the one who serves me."

== Interpretation ==
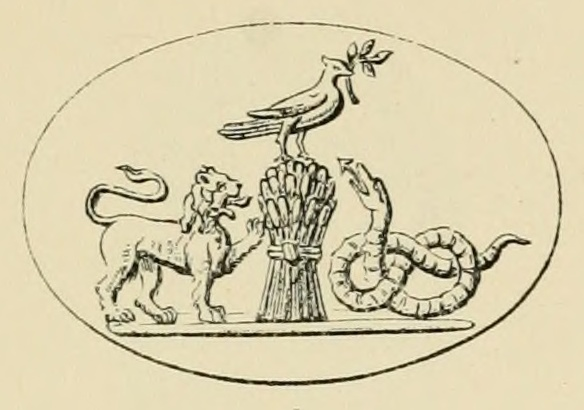
Late antique gem engraved with a wheatsheaf, on which is perched the Dove, placed between its enemies, the Lion and the Serpent = World and Devil.

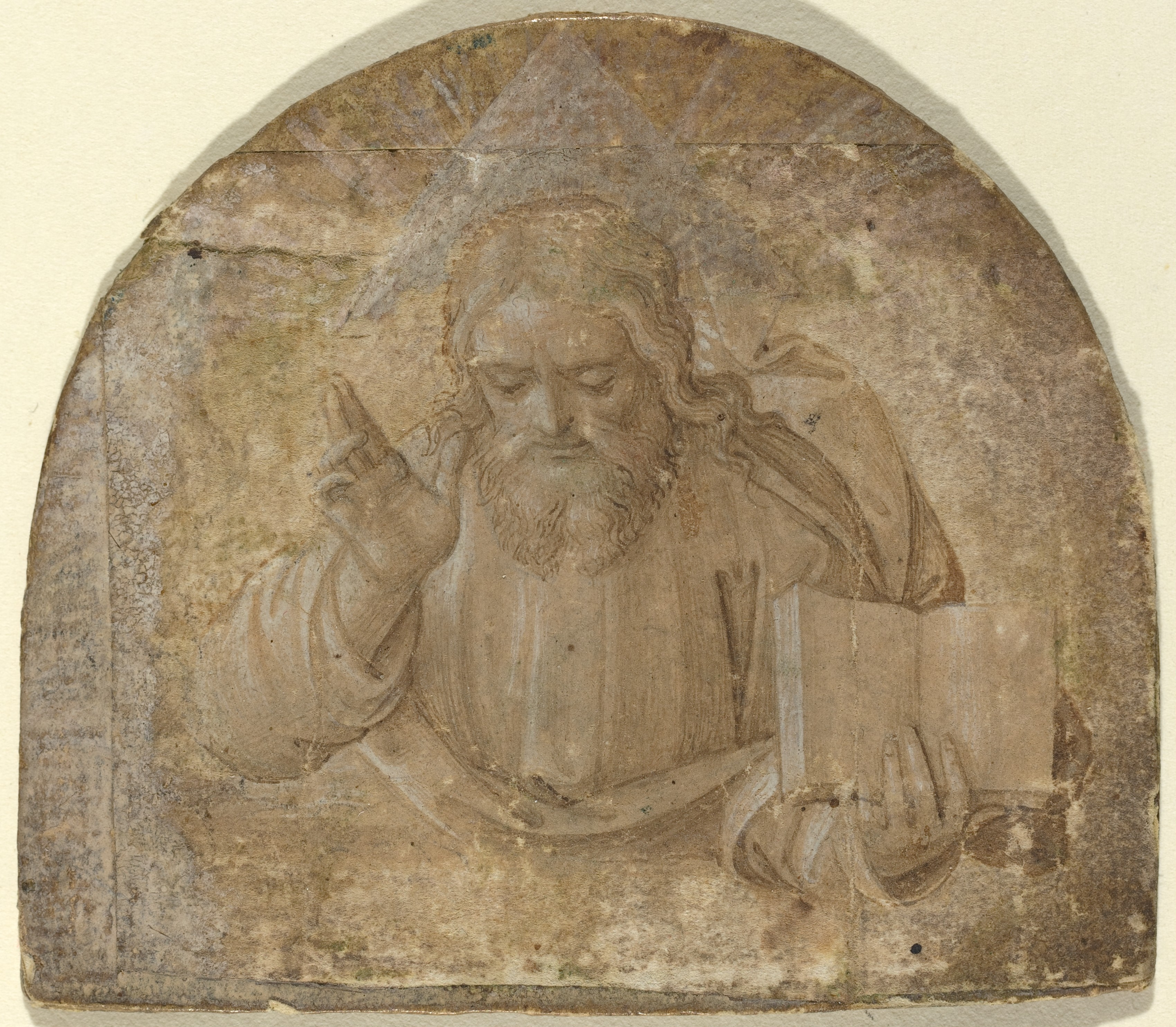
God the Father providing a blessing, by Girolamo dai Libri.

Jesus took this parable about resurrection and the kingdom of God from the circumstances of everyday life. His audience could easily understand the principle of "resurrection" produced by dead seeds sown into the earth. Jesus uses the metaphor of the grain of wheat to illustrate the importance of ego death in the pursuit of salvation and entering the Kingdom of Heaven. He is suggesting that one must first allow their current convictions and ideas about the world to die and be shed, before they can be reborn with a purer, more virtuous self that is stronger than the original.

The image of the grain of wheat dying in the earth in order to grow and bear a harvest can be seen also as a metaphor of Jesus' own death and burial in the tomb and his resurrection.

The Reverend William D. Oldland in his sermon "Unless a Grain of Wheat Falls into the Earth and Dies" said:

This parable is used by Jesus to teach them three things. First, he teaches them that he must die. Secondly, he shows them God is in control. Finally, he shows them that his death has purpose.

The Apostle Paul also wrote: "The body that is sown is perishable, it is raised imperishable."

A section of this biblical parable serves as a short epigraph for the philosophical novel The Brothers Karamazov.
