= Erna Woll =

German composer, church musician and author

Erna Woll (23 March 1917 – 7 April 2005) was a German composer, church musician and author.

== Life ==
Erna Woll was born in St. Ingbert in the Saar. She studied music from 1936 to 1938 at the Evangelisches Kirchenmusikalisches Institut Heidelberg with Wolfgang Fortner and studied composition from 1940 to 1944 with Joseph Haas and Gustav Geierhaas at the Munich Academy of Music. During this time she converted to Catholicism, and from 1946 to 1948 she studied Catholic church music at the Cologne Music Academy with Heinrich Lemacher, Theodor Bernhard Rehmann and Hermann Schroeder.

From 1950 to 1962, Woll worked as an organist in Cologne Bayenthal and a music teacher and choral director at the Church Music Institute in Speyer. From 1962 to 1969 she was a lecturer, and from 1969 to 1972 she was Honorary Professor at the College of Education at Augsburg. In 1972 she retired from working due to a serious illness, but after recovering she continued to compose. Woll died 7 April 2005 in Augsburg.

Erna Woll was a member of professional organizations including the Werkgemeinschaft Musik, the Ecumenical Lyricists and Composers working group, and the AG Musik in der Evangelischen Jugend.

== Honors ==
- 1963 and 1967: Valentin-Becker-Prize of the City Brückenau
- 1972: first prize of the contest "New hymn Kiel"
- 1976: Awards of the German Federal Government and the singer generally Swabian Sängerbund
- 1993: papal honor Cross Pro Ecclesia et Pontifice for services to the Catholic Church Music
- 1997: Order of Merit of the Federal Republic of Germany

== Works ==
Erna Woll composed over 200 works including solo songs, choruses, motets, cantatas and choral pieces. She was especially interested in the music genre of New Sacred Song (Neues Geistliches Lied). Selected works include:

- Love songs for medium voice and piano, Schott (1944/55)
- Sweet lyre. Triptych for mixed chorus and tenor solo, Schott (1960/65)
- Choralis Missa for mixed or equal voices, congregation and organ. Schwann (1958/60)
- We believe. Ordinary for mixed or equal voices, congregation and organ, Fidula (1965)
- Spiritus domini. Proprium to Pentecost Sunday for choir and orchestra (1963)
- Seven lives I should like to have. Cycle for solo voice, mixed choir and instruments, Helbling (1966)
- Requiem for the living. for mixed choir and instruments on texts by *Marie Luise Kaschnitz Others Möseler (1975)
- Four motets. based on texts by Gertrude von le Fort (1975–76), South German music publisher
- Search - Hearing - praise. Orgeltriptychon, Strube, 1985
- Augsburg Organ Issue. Strube, 1987
- Sola gratia. Strube, 1988
- Invocations. Strube, 1988
- Christmas Gospel according to Luke. Strube, 1988
- Children ask for Maria. Strube, 1988
- Through the pain barrier V. 1989
- Women around Jesus. Strube, 1990
- Songs to God, othodoxen service for equal voices, 1990 dedicated to the Segiuschor Weingarten
- How to sing and say. Strube, 1991
- The well-beloved, the Niegeliebten. Strube, 1991
- Mirjam born. Five Meditations for Organ, Pro Organo, 1991
- Now the dark night is over. Strube, 1991
- ... and Mary. Strube, 1992
- Sound tracks on the organ. Boehm, 1992
- Meditate on flute and organ. Boehm, 1992
- Transient response. Mosaic for organ, Schott 1993
- Where are you, God. Strube, 1995
- Magic wishes. Furore, 1995
- The 80th Psalm. Strube, 1995
- Ave Maria tender. Strube, 1997
- It is the Lord of glory. Strube, 1997
- From sky high. Möseler 2002
