= St. Wendel, Frankfurt =

St. Wendel
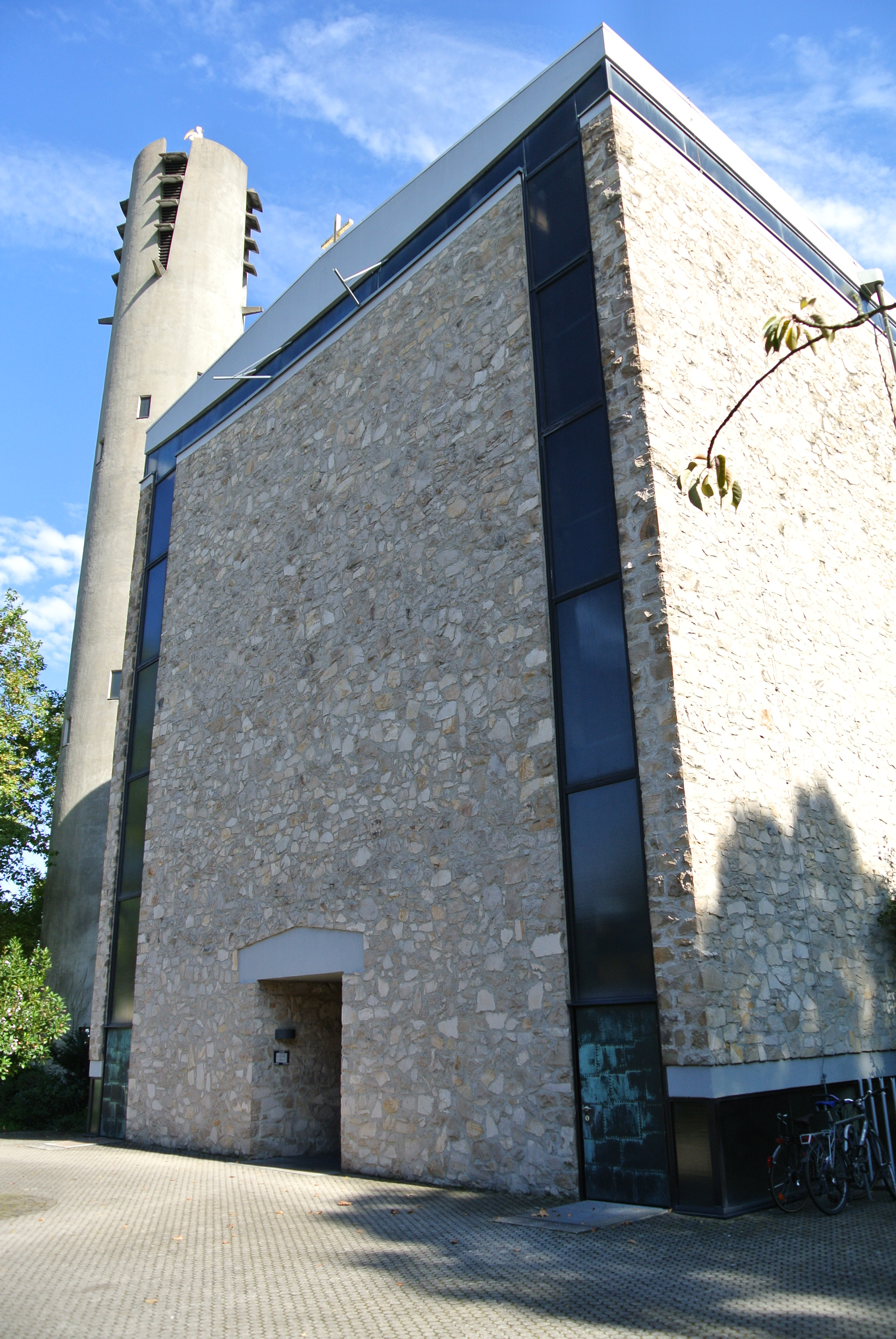
- St. Wendel from southwest
- St. Wendel
- 50°05′31″N 8°41′40″E
- Location: Frankfurt, Hesse, Germany
- Denomination: Catholic
- Website: www.st-wendel-gemeinde.de

History
- Dedication: Wendelin of Trier
- Consecrated: 5 June 1965

Architecture
- Architect: Johannes Krahn

Administration
- Diocese: Limburg

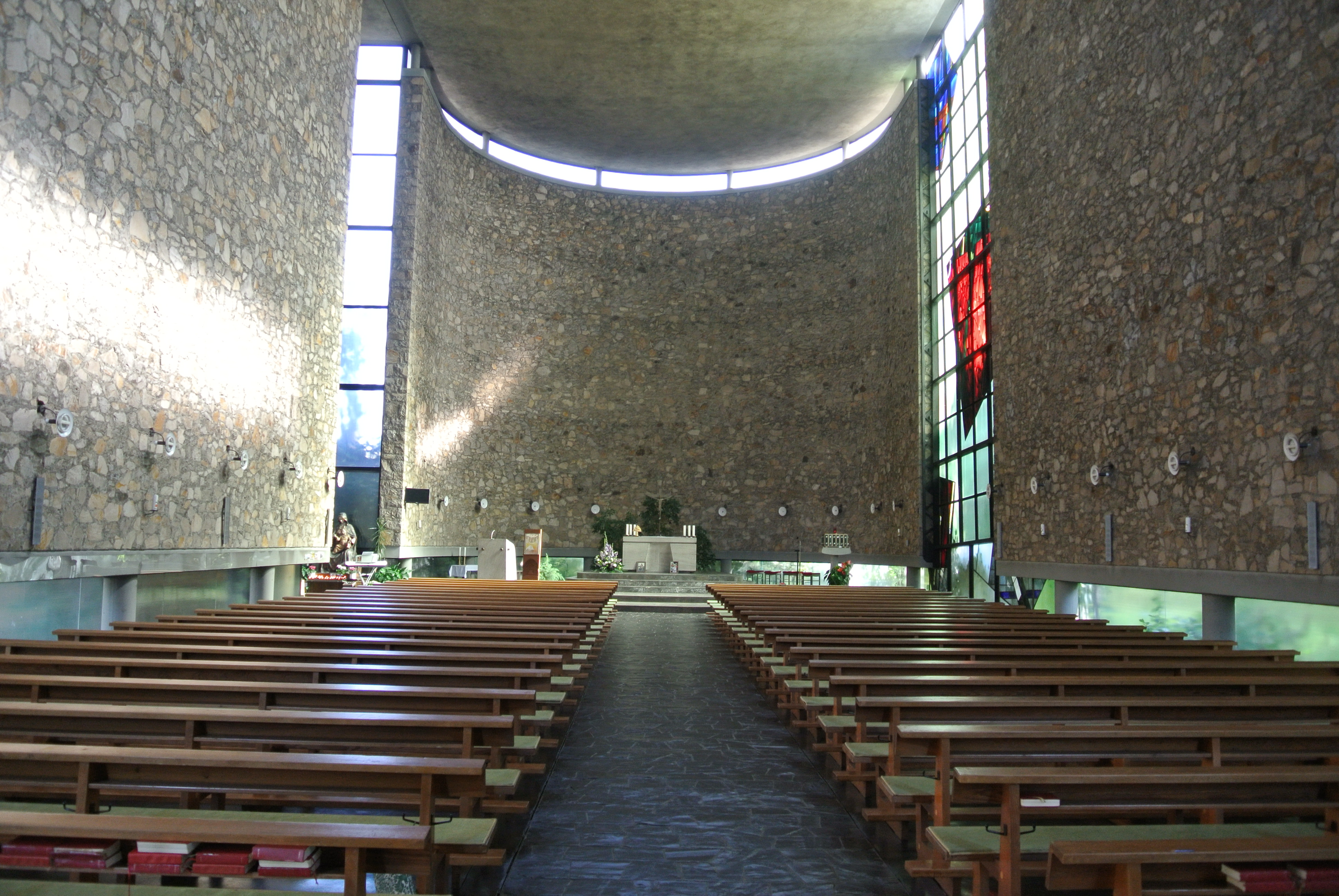
Interior facing the altar

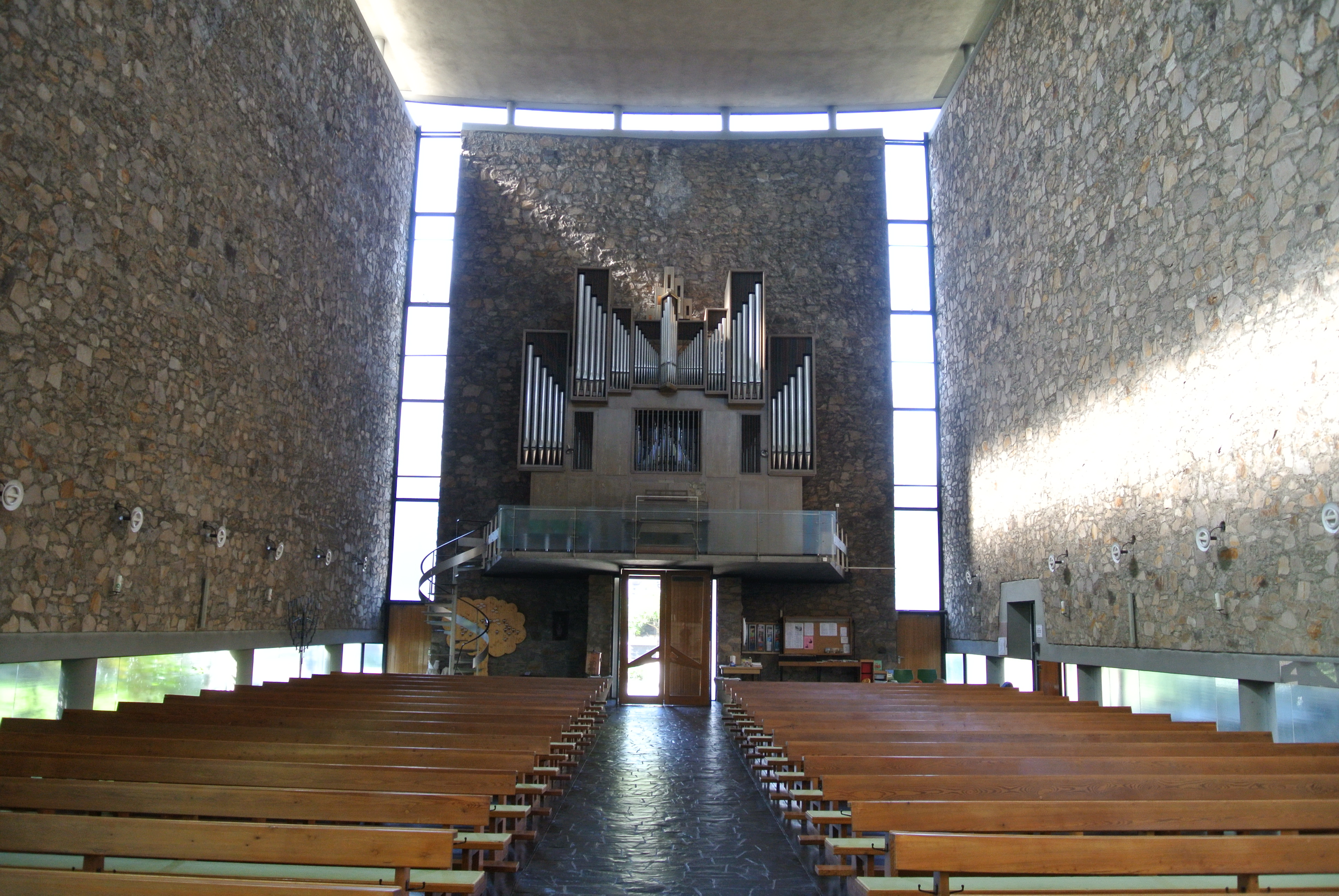
Interior facong the organ

St. Wendel is the name of a Catholic parish and church in Frankfurt-Sachsenhausen, Hesse, Germany, dedicated to Wendelin of Trier. The official name of the church is Kath. St. Wendelskirche. It was built from 1955 to 1957, designed by architect Johannes Krahn.

== History ==
Sachsenhausen had from 1369 a chapel dedicated to Wendelin of Trier, the patron saint of shepherds. In 1938, the architect Martin Weber built a provisionary church for the parish. It survived the war with little damage. The building of the present church began in 1955, and was completed in 1957. From 1962 to 1995, Lothar Zenetti was the parish priest. Since 2014, the parish St. Wendel is part of the larger St. Bonifatius.

== Architecture ==
Johannes Krahn, who built several churches and early skyscrapers such as the Beehive House in Frankfurt am Main, designed a space recalling elements of an early Romanesque Basilica. In a simple shape, a single long nave is concluded by a semicircle choir around the altar. The outer walls are sandstone, visible both inside and outside. Light flows in from bands of windows. The combination of materials has been compared to Le Corbusier. The building recalls the austere style of sacred architecture of the 1950s.

The stained glass window to the south was created by Georg Meistermann. The bronze crucifix on the altar was made by Hans Mettel. Golden features were created by Fritz Schwerdt and Friedrich Gebhart. The organ, on a balcony above the main entrance, was built by Förster & Nicolaus Orgelbau in 1966, with 31 stops.

== Literature ==
- Karin Berkemann: Nachkriegskirchen in Frankfurt am Main (1945-76) (Denkmaltopographie Bundesrepublik Deutschland; Kulturdenkmäler in Hessen), Theiss-Verlag, ISBN 978-3-8062-2812-0, Stuttgart 2013 [dissertation, Neuendettelsau, 2012]
- Deutscher Werkbund Hessen, Wilhelm E. Opatz (ed.): Einst gelobt und fast vergessen, moderne Kirchen in Frankfurt a. M. 1948–1973, Niggli-Verlag, Sulgen 2012, ISBN 978-3-7212-0842-9
- Clemens Jöckle: 100 Bauwerke in Frankfurt am Main, Ein Wegweiser zu Bauwerken von historischem und baukünstlerischem Rang, Verlag Schnell & Steiner, Regensburg 1988, ISBN 3-7954-1166-1
- Hugo Schnell: Der Kirchenbau des 20. Jahrhunderts in Deutschland, Regensburg 1973
