= Auf dem Weg durch diese Nacht =

Christian hymn

- Christian hymn
- Occasion: Nunc dimittis
- Written: 2005
- Text: by Eugen Eckert
- Language: German
- Melody: by Horst Christill
- Composed: 2005
- Published: 2006

Auf dem Weg durch diese Nacht
- Editor: Patrick Dehm; Johannes Schröder
- Language: German
- Publisher: Dehm-Verlag
- Publication date: 2021

"Auf dem Weg durch diese Nacht" (On the way through this night) is a Christian hymn created in 2005 by lyricist Eugen Eckert and composer Horst Christill. The song of the genre Neues Geistliches Lied (NGL), was first published and recorded in 2006, and has appeared in German hymnals and songbooks. Auf dem Weg durch diese Nacht became the title of a 2021 choral collection of new compositions for Abendlob.

== Song ==
Eugen Eckert and Horst Christill created "Auf dem Weg durch diese Nacht" in 2005 as a paraphrase of the Nunc dimittis to be used in liturgies of the hours. The song of the genre Neues Geistliches Lied (NGL) has appeared in German hymnals and songbooks, including Ein Segen sein (Be a blessing), and the Junges Gotteslob, a version of the Catholic hymnal in German Gotteslob for young people. It was published in 2006 in a collection NachKlänge (After-sounds), subtitled "Musikalische Nachtgebete" (Musical night prayers) by Dehm, with a selection of the songs recorded, including "Auf dem Weg durch diese Nacht". "Auf dem Weg durch diese Nacht" was recorded in 2017 as part of the collection Jetzt (Now) of the band Habakuk.

== Collection ==
The first line of the hymn is the title of a collection of chorale music for Abendlob, a service rich in music in the tradition of evensong. The collection was published in 2021 by Dehm-Verlag and edited by Patrick Dehm and Johannes Schröder. Its subtitle "Chorbuch Evensong / Abendlob, für Oberstimmenchor und gemischten Chor (SATB/SSA/SAA)" indicates that the choral collection contains many entries for a four-part choir SATB as well as those for high voices only. Seventeen of the 90 entries were published for the first time. Most compositions were written by members of the ecumenical association inTAKT. An accompanied piano piece enables performances by a single voice. The book offers several psalms settings. It contains a Magnificat by Peter Reulein for both a two-part women's choir and a four-part choir, as well as an organ. Another Magnificat, Schröder's Der Tag bricht an (The day will break) comes in two versions: one four-part section and the other for three upper voices, and the sections can be combined. The work requires a well-versed organist.

Songs from the collection were performed in an Abendlob, as part of the 102nd Katholikentag at the Friedenskirche, Stuttgart, on 28 May 2022. Schröder conducted the Chor von St. Bonifatius and an instrumental ensemble.
