= Weite Räume meinen Füßen =

2000 German Christian hymn

- Christian hymn
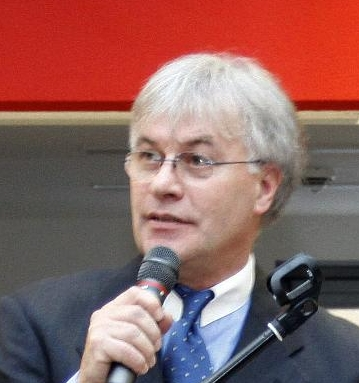
- Eugen Eckert in 2008
- English: Wide room for my feet
- Text: by Eugen Eckert
- Language: German
- Melody: by Horst Christill
- Published: 2000

"Weite Räume meinen Füßen" (Wide room for my feet) is a Christian hymn in German with text by Eugen Eckert and a tune by Alejandro Veciana. It is based on a verse from Psalm 31, "Du stellst meine Füße auf weiten Raum" (Thou hast set my feet in a large room.), which forms the refrain. Its topics are the broad perspectives of life. The song of the genre Neues Geistliches Lied is part of many hymnals and songbooks.

== History, text and music ==
The Protestant theologian and pastor Eugen Eckert from Frankfurt and composer Alejandro Veciana wrote the song "Weite Räume meinen Füßen" in 2000 in collaboration. Both are regarded as prolific authors of songs of the genre Neues Geistliches Lied (New sacred song). The text is derived from a verse 8b from Psalm 31, "Du stellst meine Füße auf weiten Raum" (Thou hast set my feet in a large room)", which is the refrain. The song is also known by this line.

The song appeared in many hymnals and songbooks, including Ein Segen sein / Junges Gotteslob.

The song is in four stanzas, each of two lines. The text speaks of wide possibilities of life, horizons between courage and anxiety, and perspectives between chances and dangers. The music by Veciana is in B minor and common time. In the stanzas, the second line is repeated with a slightly different melody. The refrain repeats the psalm verse several times, and its last words even more often.

The band Habakuk recorded the song in 2001 on a CD entitled Sommer.
