= Was mein Herz schwer macht =

Christian hymn

- Christian hymn
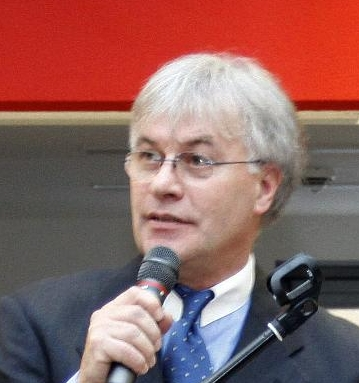
- Eugen Eckert in 2015
- English: What makes my heart heavy
- Written: 2001
- Text: by Eugen Eckert
- Language: German
- Melody: by Jürgen Kandziora

"Was mein Herz schwer macht" (What makes my heart heavy) is a 2001 Christian song with text by Eugen Eckert, with a melody by Jürgen Kandziora. The hymn of the genre Neues Geistliches Lied is contained in several hymnals and songbooks.

== History ==
The text "Was mein Herz schwer macht" was written by the Protestant theologian and pastor Eugen Eckert from Frankfurt. The melody was composed by Jürgen Kandziora.

The song has four stanzas, bringing sorrows and shortcomings before God in hope of his mercy. All stanzas end with the line "Gott meines Lebens, erbarme dich" (God of my life, have mercy). The melody is in a triple time, beginning in E minor and ending in G major.

A four-part setting for men's chorus by Kandziora was published by Dehm Verlag in 2003. The song is contained in the regional section of the Gotteslob in the Diocese of Limburg as GL 833, in hymnals for young people and in several songbooks, including Auf dem Weg durch diese Nacht. It can be sung for the Kyrie of the mass, and has also been recommended for funerals.
