= Bernhard Kießig =

German pianist

- Education: Hochschule für Musik und Darstellende Kunst Frankfurt am Main
- Occupations: Jazz pianist; Composer; Academic teacher
- Organizations: The Academic Project; Staatstheater Darmstadt; Hochschule für Musik und Darstellende Kunst Frankfurt am Main

Bernhard Kießig is a German pianist, especially jazz pianist, composer and lecturer. He composed part of the oratorio Eins for Ökumenischer Kirchentag 2021.

== Career ==
Kießig studied Protestant church music and jazz piano at the Hochschule für Musik und Darstellende Kunst Frankfurt am Main, on a scholarship of the Hanns-Seidel-Stiftung. He was a recipient of prizes of both Jugend musiziert and Jugend jazzt, and played in the Landesjugendjazzorchester Hesse. He founded a jazz quartet, The Academic Project, supported by the "Live Music Now" foundation, and recognised in the Frankfurt jazz scene. He worked at the Staatstheater Darmstadt as pianist and repetiteur for opera and ballet. In 2013, Kießig became referent for pop music at the Evangelische Landeskirche in Hessen und Nassau. Beginning in 2018, he has also worked as pianist for the dance faculty at the Hochschule für Musik und Darstellende Kunst Frankfurt.

He was commissioned to compose parts of the oratorio Eins for Ökumenischer Kirchentag 2021 in Frankfurt. It was published by the Dehm-Verlag and first performed in a livestream concert on 4 May 2021, with Kießig as the pianist.

== Works ==
- Eins, oratorio, a 2021 collaboration for the Ökumenischer Kirchentag 2021 in Frankfurt
