= Eins =

Eins may refer to:

- E.I.N.S., a 1996 album by German rock band Böhse Onkelz
- Eins (oratorio), written for the Ökumenischer Kirchentag 2021
- Stefan Eins (born 1940), Austrian-American artist

== See also ==
- Ein (disambiguation)
- One (disambiguation)
