= Glauben können wie du =

- Christian poem and hymn
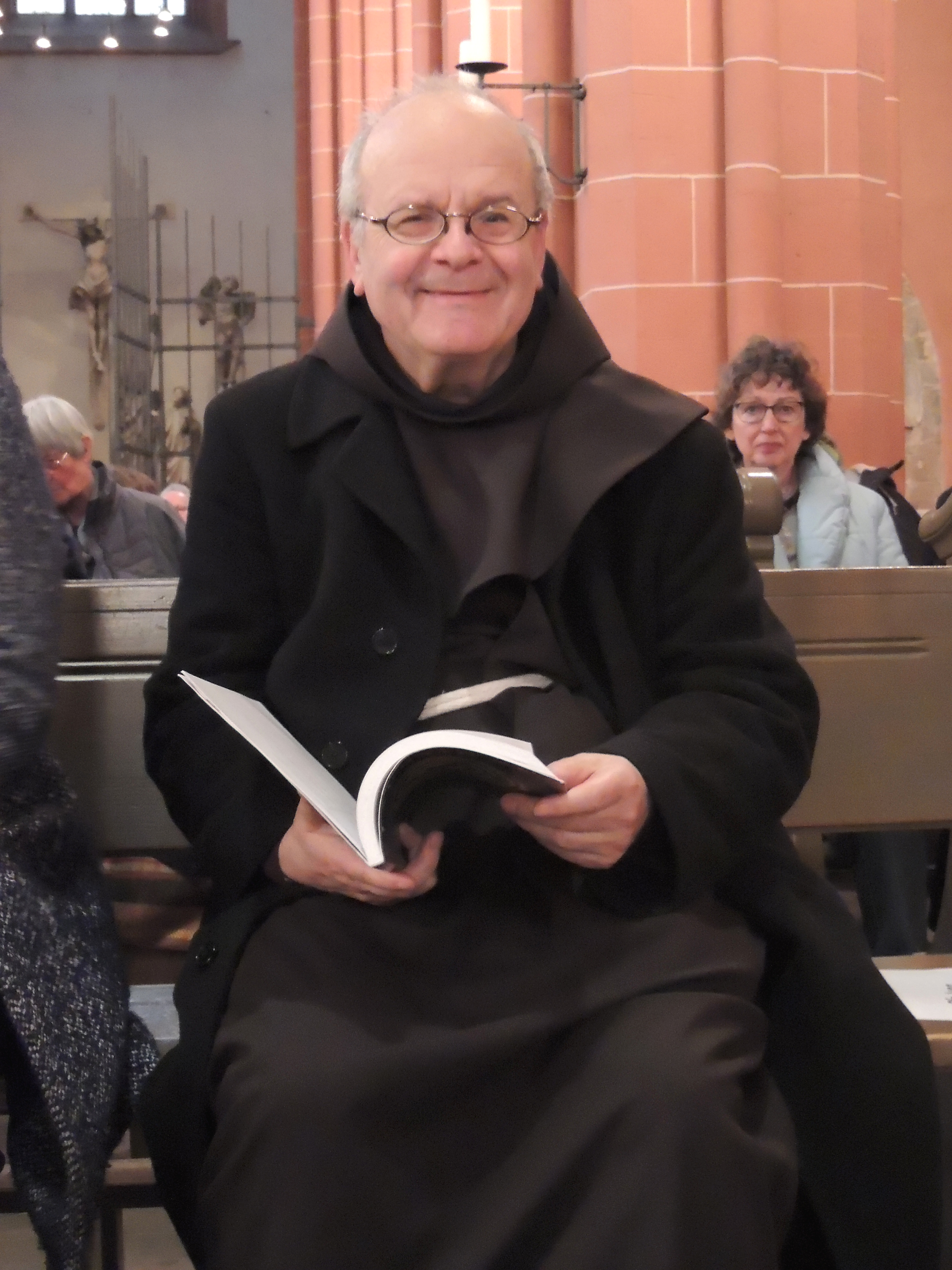
- Helmut Schlegel OFM, in Frankfurt Cathedral 2017
- Written: 2009
- Text: by Helmut Schlegel
- Language: German
- Melody: by Joachim Raabe

"Glauben können wie du" (Being able to believe like you) is a Christian poem by Helmut Schlegel, written in 2009, and made a hymn of the genre Neues Geistliches Lied with a melody by Joachim Raabe the same year. It addresses Mary, the mother of Jesus, to be imitated living the theological virtues of faith, hope and love. The song is included in song books and the Catholic hymnal Gotteslob.

== History ==
The poem was written by the Franciscan Helmut Schlegel in 2009. It is in three similar stanzas, each with five uneven lines without rhyme. It addresses Mary, the mother of Jesus and refers to biblical scenes from her life.

The text has been set to music by Joachim Raabe. The hymn appears in the regional part of the Catholic hymnal Gotteslob of the Diocese of Limburg as GL 885. It is also part of Junges Gotteslob, the hymnal for young people, and of the choral songbook Die Träume hüten (Guarding the dreams) in the section Maria, published by the Dehm-Verlag.

The song was included in a four-part setting with orchestra by Peter Reulein in his oratorio Laudato si', which premiered in 2016 at the Limburg Cathedral.

== Text and melody ==
The first stanza is the model for the others. In the first short line, Mary is addressed, "Glauben können wie du" in the first stanza, "Hoffen können wie du" in the second, "Lieben können wie Du". Glauben, Hoffen, Lieben relates to the teaching of Paul the Apostle about the theological virtues of faith, hope and love. The speaker or singer acknowledges that Mary is able to believe, hope and love, and wishes to be able to do the same. The second and third line, both much longer, describe more precisely what the action comprises. The long fourth line leads to a biblical quotation. This is in the first stanza "Großes hat er getan." (Luke 1:49) from the Magnificat, in the second stanza "Was er euch sagt, das tut." (John 2:5) from the Wedding at Cana, and finally "Mir geschehe dein Wort" (Luke 1:38) from the Annunciation. The final short line of a stanza is the first to use "ich" (I) and expresses the wish of the singer to imitate Mary: "So will ich glauben (hoffen, lieben), Maria" (I want to believe (hope, love) like this, Mary.).

The melody is in F major and 6/8 time. It is built in six phrases of mostly two measures. The first and last lines end on long notes, while the second and third line carry their longer text in mostly even eighth-notes. The announcement of the biblical quotation is an extra measure, then the quotation is represented by a rising line which ends on the longest note of the song. The last line is a gentle downward line. The melody has been described by Manuel Braun, organist in the Diocese of Limburg, as easy to learn.
