= Gott hat mir längst einen Engel gesandt =

Christian hymn

- Christian hymn by Thomas Gabriel
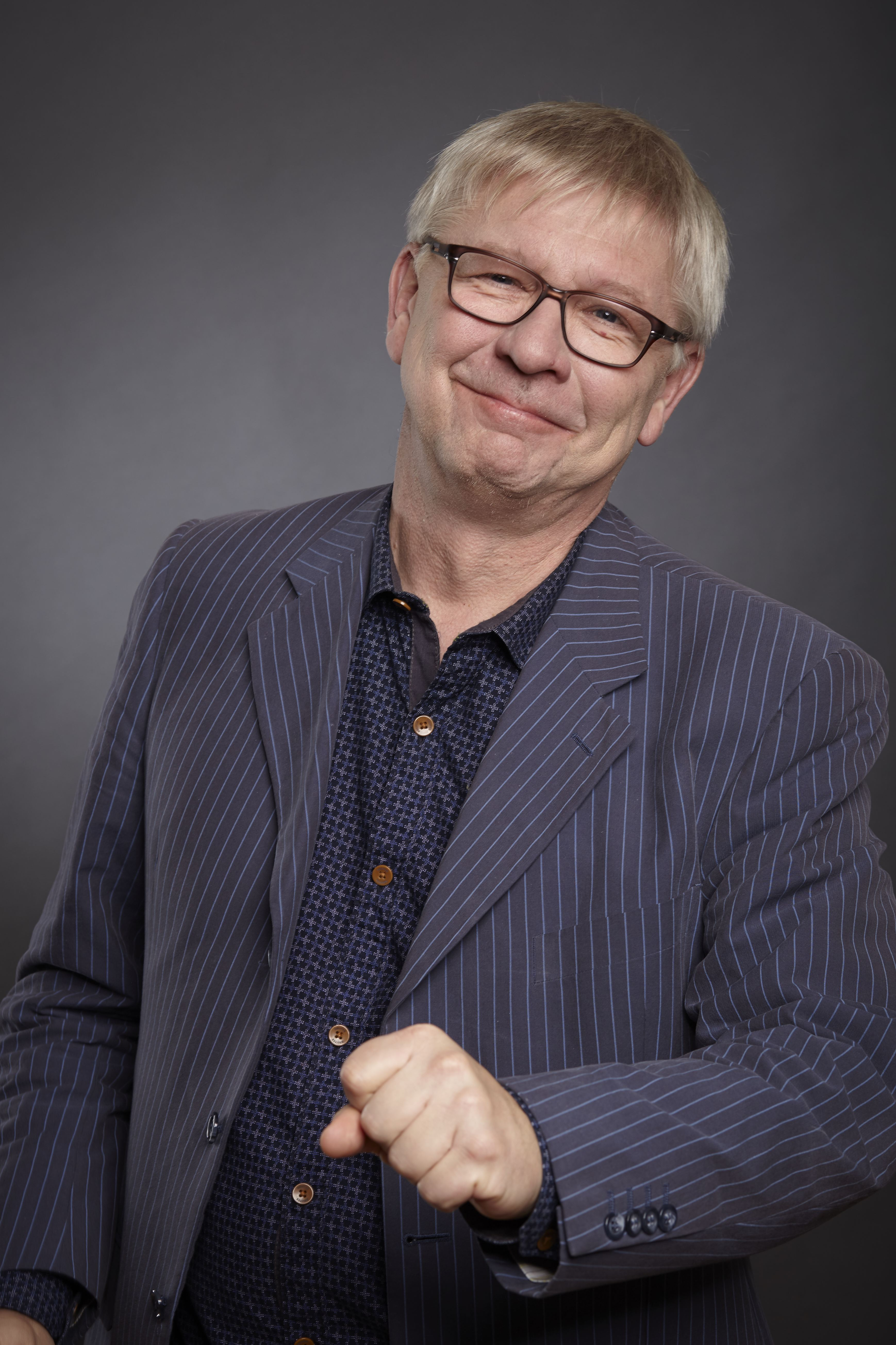
- Thomas Gabriel in 2015
- English: God has long since sent me an angel
- Written: 1996
- Text: by Eugen Eckert
- Language: German

"Gott hat mir längst einen Engel gesandt" ("God sent an angel to me long ago") is a 1996 Christian song with text by Eugen Eckert, set for a four-part choir by Thomas Gabriel as part of the rock oratorio Daniel. It became a hymn of the genre Neues Geistliches Lied, which is contained in several hymnals and songbooks.

== History ==
The text "Gott hat mir längst einen Engel gesandt" was written by the Protestant theologian and pastor Eugen Eckert from Frankfurt, who has taken care of students, the football arena, and persons outcast by society. The song is part of the libretto for a rock oratorio Daniel which he wrote for the band Habakuk of which he is a member. The oratorio was commissioned by the Diocese of Trier for the 1996 Heilig-Rock-Wallfahrt, a pilgrimage to the diocese's relic of a seamless robe of Jesus. The story line after the Book of Daniel tells of rescue from deportation, intrigue, violence and suppression. The music was composed by Thomas Gabriel. In the oratorio, the words of the song are first sung by Daniel after he was rescued in the lion's den by an angel; they are then repeated by the choir, and further repeated including the audience. The message of the angel who brought light in darkness is: "Fürchte dich nicht!" (Fear not!)

The music recalls the rhythm of a pavane. It shifts harmonies when speaking about darkness, and returns to the first key for the last line "Du bist bei Gott aufgehoben" (You are in God's care).

The oratorio was premiered in 1996 by the band Habakuk. It was recorded, and released the following year, with the composer at the keyboard. The CD was reissued in 2002. The song was also recorded in a collection Der Engel in dir (The angel in you) of music by Gabriel dealing with angels, conducted by the composer.

The choral setting was published by Strube-Verlag. The song is contained in hymnals for young people and in several songbooks. Gabriel used it again in his 2019 oratorio Gabriel – Im Auftrag des Herrn (Gabriel – Assigned by the Lord).
