= Psalm 139 =

139th psalm of the biblical Book of Psalms

- "O Lord, thou hast searched me, and known me"
- Hymn psalm
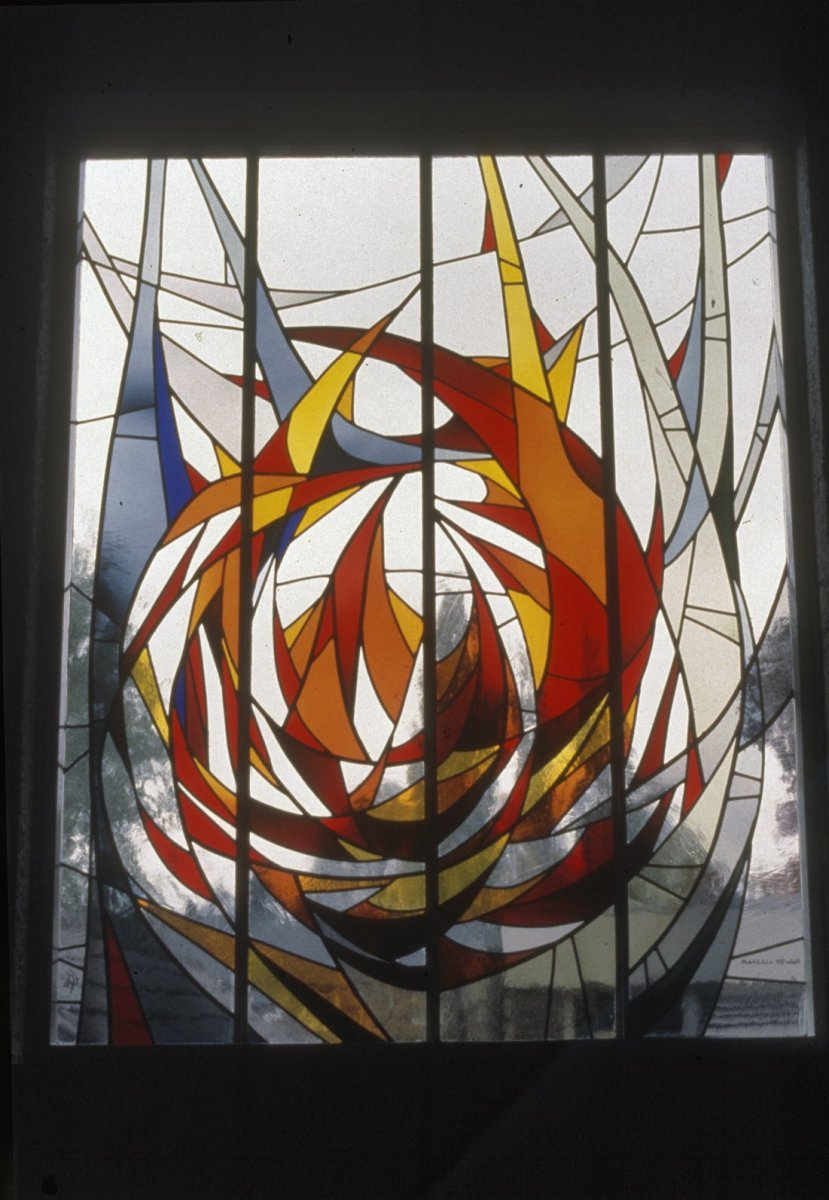
- A 1983 stained-glass window by Ted Felen titled Psalm 139
- Other name: Psalm 138 (Vulgate); "Domine probasti me et cognovisti me"
- Language: Hebrew (original)

Psalm 139
- ← Psalm 138 Psalm 140 →
- Book: Book of Psalms
- Hebrew Bible part: Ketuvim
- Order in the Hebrew part: 1
- Category: Sifrei Emet
- Christian Bible part: Old Testament
- Order in the Christian part: 19

Psalm 139 is the 139th psalm of the Book of Psalms, beginning in English in the King James Version: "O Lord, thou hast searched me, and known me". In Latin, it is known as "Domine probasti me et cognovisti me". The psalm is a hymn psalm. Attributed to David, it is known for its affirmation of God's omnipresence. Alexander Kirkpatrick states that "the consciousness of the intimate personal relation between God and man which is characteristic of the whole Psalter reaches its climax here".

In the slightly different numbering system used in the Greek Septuagint version of the Bible, and in the Vulgate, this psalm is Psalm 138.

The psalm forms a regular part of Jewish, Catholic, Lutheran, Anglican and other Protestant liturgies. It has often been set to music.

== Background and themes ==
According to the Midrash Shocher Tov, Psalm 139 was written by Adam. Verses 5 and 16, for example, allude to the formation of the First Man. Abramowitz explains that the themes of the psalm relate to Adam, while David wrote the actual words. Psalm 139 is part of the final Davidic collection of psalms, comprising Psalms 138 through 145, which are attributed to David in the first verse.

Verse 16 is the only place in the Tanakh where the word גָּלְמִ֚י, galmi, from the same root as the term golem, appears. In describing the creation of Adam hour by hour, the Talmud states that in the second hour the dust from the earth was gathered into a golem ('unformed mass') (Sanhedrin 38b). A Midrash on Genesis 5:1 also describes Adam's creation as a golem of immense size, stretching from one end of the earth to the other. This is reflected in verse 16, in which Adam says to God, "Your eyes saw my golem".

The psalm addresses God, or, in Jewish tradition, YHWH, and the speaker calls out and establishes a salutation and an understanding of what they know God to be. The psalmist goes on to marvel at the omnipresence of God even in the most secret of places, and praise God for his vast knowledge of the future. Finally, the psalmist concludes by asking God to "slay the wicked" and stands against them, assuring God of their fervor, asking to be tested and led in the correct path. The psalmist praises God; terms of supreme authority, and being able to witness everything on heaven, earth and in the underworld. Through this psalm, the psalmist insists on God being the only true God and challenges anyone to question their faith.

== Use ==
=== Judaism ===
- Psalm 139 is recited during the week of Parashat Bereishit.
- Verses 8–10 are included in a Tefilat HaDerech (Traveler's Prayer) produced by the Open Siddur Project; similarly, verses 9 and 10 are included in a Reform version of the Traveler's Prayer.

=== Catholic Church ===
Since the Middle Ages, this psalm was recited or sung during the Vespers office on Thursday, according to the Rule of St. Benedict, established in 530. Because of its length, it was divided into two, and from "dixi: Tenebrae Forsitan conculcabunt me" (verse 11) was executed as a division. The Vespers on Thursday thus had only three psalms instead of four.

In the current Liturgy of the Hours, Psalm 139 is recited at Vespers, but also on Wednesdays of the fourth week of the main four weekly cycle of liturgical prayers. In the liturgy of the Mass, it is played or sung for the Feast of St. John the Baptist.

=== Other ===
Psalm 139:13 has been used by both the pro-life and LGBT movements as a blessing and a source of support for their activities. The Ethics and Religious Liberty Commission of the Southern Baptist Convention sponsors the Psalm 139 Project, which aims to place ultrasound machines in crisis pregnancy centers as a means of convincing pregnant women not to abort their unborn child.

== Psalm 139 in music ==
The hymn "Ob ich sitze oder stehe" ('Whether I sit or stand'), of the genre Neues Geistliches Lied, by Eugen Eckert is based on Psalm 139.

=== Classical music ===
Heinrich Schütz composed a metred paraphrase of Psalm 139 in German, "Herr, du erforschst mein Sinne", SWV 244, for the Becker Psalter, published first in 1628.

- Der 139. Psalm for alto solo, mixed choir and orchestra" by Ernst Pepping
- Erforsche mich, Gott, und erfahre mein Herz, BWV 136, cantata by Johann Sebastian Bach for the eighth Sunday after Trinity
- Psalm 139 by William Gillies Whittaker
- Psalm 139 for alto, mixed unison choir and organ by Rudi Spring
- Psalm 139 for mixed choir" by Johann Nepomuk David
- Psalm 139 by James O'Donnell, performed in Westminster Hall after the death of Elizabeth II
- The Wings of the Morning, for medium voice and piano, by David Evan Thomas
- Thou hast searched me and known me by Joanna Marsh
- Psalm 139 by Jan Rokus van Roosendael

=== Jazz ===
- 139. Psalm for mezzo-soprano, trumpet, trombone and tuba by Franz Koglmann

=== Contemporary Christian music ===
- "139/Dead of Night" from the 2016 album Invisible by Leeland incorporates verses from Psalm 139 as lyrics
- "If I go up" by Eden Burning
- "Fearfully and Wonderfully Made" by Charlotte Martin
- "Ken je mij?" by Trijntje Oosterhuis
- "139" by Kings Kaleidoscope
- "Psalm 139" by Michael W. Smith
- "Psalm 139" by Sarah Reeves
- "Psalm 139 Far Too Wonderful" from the 2015 album Psalms II by Shane & Shane
- "Psalm 139 (You Are There)" by MercyMe
- "There is no moment of my life" by Brian Foley
- "Wings of the Morning" by Capleton and Method Man
- "You Will Be There" by Jeremy Camp
- "Psalm 139" from the 1999 album Skalleluia Too! by The Insyderz
- "O God, you search me and you know me" by Bernadette Farrell.
- "Anywhere I Go" by Glad
- "Psalm 139" hidden track from the 1996 album God by Rebecca St. James

== In literature ==
Verses 9-10 feature in the short story Ved det yderste Hav (The uttermost parts of the sea) by Danish writer Hans Christian Andersen.

== Text ==
The following table shows the Hebrew text of the Psalm with vowels, alongside the Koine Greek text in the Septuagint and the English translation from the King James Version. Note that the meaning can slightly differ between these versions, as the Septuagint and the Masoretic Text come from different textual traditions. (Note: A 1917 translation directly from Hebrew to English by the Jewish Publication Society can be found here or here, and an 1844 translation directly from the Septuagint by L. C. L. Brenton can be found here. Both translations are in the public domain.) In the Septuagint, this psalm is numbered Psalm 138.

#	Hebrew	English	Greek
1	לַ֭מְנַצֵּחַ לְדָוִ֣ד מִזְמ֑וֹר יְהֹוָ֥ה חֲ֝קַרְתַּ֗נִי וַתֵּדָֽע׃	(To the chief Musician, A Psalm of David.) O Lord, thou hast searched me, and known me.	Εἰς τὸ τέλος· ψαλμὸς τῷ Δαυΐδ. - ΚΥΡΙΕ, ἐδοκίμασάς με, καὶ ἔγνως με·
2	אַתָּ֣ה יָ֭דַעְתָּ שִׁבְתִּ֣י וְקוּמִ֑י בַּ֥נְתָּה לְ֝רֵעִ֗י מֵרָחֽוֹק׃	Thou knowest my downsitting and mine uprising, thou understandest my thought afar off.	σὺ ἔγνως τὴν καθέδραν μου καὶ τὴν ἔγερσίν μου, σὺ συνῆκας τοὺς διαλογισμούς μου ἀπὸ μακρόθεν·
3	אׇרְחִ֣י וְרִבְעִ֣י זֵרִ֑יתָ וְֽכׇל־דְּרָכַ֥י הִסְכַּֽנְתָּה׃	Thou compassest my path and my lying down, and art acquainted with all my ways.	τὴν τρίβον μου καὶ τὴν σχοῖνόν μου ἐξιχνίασας καὶ πάσας τὰς ὁδούς μου προεῖδες,
4	כִּ֤י אֵ֣ין מִ֭לָּה בִּלְשׁוֹנִ֑י הֵ֥ן יְ֝הֹוָ֗ה יָדַ֥עְתָּ כֻלָּֽהּ׃	For there is not a word in my tongue, but, lo, O Lord, thou knowest it altogether.	ὅτι οὐκ ἔστι δόλος ἐν γλώσσῃ μου.
5	אָח֣וֹר וָקֶ֣דֶם צַרְתָּ֑נִי וַתָּ֖שֶׁת עָלַ֣י כַּפֶּֽכָה׃	Thou hast beset me behind and before, and laid thine hand upon me.	ἰδού, Κύριε, σὺ ἔγνως πάντα, τὰ ἔσχατα καὶ τὰ ἀρχαῖα· σὺ ἔπλασάς με καὶ ἔθηκας ἐπ᾿ ἐμὲ τὴν χεῖρά σου.
6	(פלאיה) [פְּלִ֣יאָֽה] דַ֣עַת מִמֶּ֑נִּי נִ֝שְׂגְּבָ֗ה לֹא־א֥וּכַֽל לָֽהּ׃	Such knowledge is too wonderful for me; it is high, I cannot attain unto it.	ἐθαυμαστώθη ἡ γνῶσίς σου ἐξ ἐμοῦ· ἐκραταιώθη, οὐ μὴ δύνωμαι πρὸς αὐτήν.
7	אָ֭נָֽה אֵלֵ֣ךְ מֵרוּחֶ֑ךָ וְ֝אָ֗נָה מִפָּנֶ֥יךָ אֶבְרָֽח׃	Whither shall I go from thy spirit? or whither shall I flee from thy presence?	ποῦ πορευθῶ ἀπὸ τοῦ πνεύματός σου καὶ ἀπὸ τοῦ προσώπου σου ποῦ φύγω;
8	אִם־אֶסַּ֣ק שָׁ֭מַיִם שָׁ֣ם אָ֑תָּה וְאַצִּ֖יעָה שְּׁא֣וֹל הִנֶּֽךָּ׃	If I ascend up into heaven, thou art there: if I make my bed in hell, behold, thou art there.	ἐὰν ἀναβῶ εἰς τὸν οὐρανόν, σὺ ἐκεῖ εἶ, ἐὰν καταβῶ εἰς τὸν ᾅδην, πάρει·
9	אֶשָּׂ֥א כַנְפֵי־שָׁ֑חַר אֶ֝שְׁכְּנָ֗ה בְּאַחֲרִ֥ית יָֽם׃	If I take the wings of the morning, and dwell in the uttermost parts of the sea;	ἐὰν ἀναλάβοιμι τὰς πτέρυγάς μου κατ᾿ ὄρθρον καὶ κατασκηνώσω εἰς τὰ ἔσχατα τῆς θαλάσσης,
10	גַּם־שָׁ֭ם יָדְךָ֣ תַנְחֵ֑נִי וְֽתֹאחֲזֵ֥נִי יְמִינֶֽךָ׃	Even there shall thy hand lead me, and thy right hand shall hold me.	καὶ γὰρ ἐκεῖ ἡ χείρ σου ὁδηγήσει με, καὶ καθέξει με ἡ δεξιά σου.
11	וָ֭אֹמַר אַךְ־חֹ֣שֶׁךְ יְשׁוּפֵ֑נִי וְ֝לַ֗יְלָה א֣וֹר בַּעֲדֵֽנִי׃	If I say, Surely the darkness shall cover me; even the night shall be light about me.	καὶ εἶπα· ἄρα σκότος καταπατήσει με, καὶ νὺξ φωτισμὸς ἐν τῇ τρυφῇ μου·
12	גַּם־חֹשֶׁךְ֮ לֹא־יַחְשִׁ֢יךְ מִ֫מֶּ֥ךָּ וְ֭לַיְלָה כַּיּ֣וֹם יָאִ֑יר כַּ֝חֲשֵׁיכָ֗ה כָּאוֹרָֽה׃	Yea, the darkness hideth not from thee; but the night shineth as the day: the darkness and the light are both alike to thee.	ὅτι σκότος οὐ σκοτισθήσεται ἀπὸ σοῦ, καὶ νὺξ ὡς ἡμέρα φωτισθήσεται· ὡς τὸ σκότος αὐτῆς, οὕτως καὶ τὸ φῶς αὐτῆς.
13	כִּֽי־אַ֭תָּה קָנִ֣יתָ כִלְיֹתָ֑י תְּ֝סֻכֵּ֗נִי בְּבֶ֣טֶן אִמִּֽי׃	For thou hast possessed my reins: thou hast covered me in my mother's womb.	ὅτι σὺ ἐκτήσω τοὺς νεφρούς μου, Κύριε, ἀντελάβου μου ἐκ γαστρὸς μητρός μου.
14	אוֹדְךָ֗ עַ֤ל כִּ֥י נֽוֹרָא֗וֹת נִ֫פְלֵ֥יתִי נִפְלָאִ֥ים מַעֲשֶׂ֑יךָ וְ֝נַפְשִׁ֗י יֹדַ֥עַת מְאֹֽד׃	I will praise thee; for I am fearfully and wonderfully made: marvellous are thy works; and that my soul knoweth right well.	ἐξομολογήσομαί σοι, ὅτι φοβερῶς ἐθαυμαστώθης· θαυμάσια τὰ ἔργα σου, καὶ ἡ ψυχή μου γινώσκει σφόδρα.
15	לֹֽא־נִכְחַ֥ד עׇצְמִ֗י מִ֫מֶּ֥ךָּ אֲשֶׁר־עֻשֵּׂ֥יתִי בַסֵּ֑תֶר רֻ֝קַּ֗מְתִּי בְּֽתַחְתִּיּ֥וֹת אָֽרֶץ׃	My substance was not hid from thee, when I was made in secret, and curiously wrought in the lowest parts of the earth.	οὐκ ἐκρύβη τὸ ὀστοῦν μου ἀπὸ σοῦ, ὃ ἐποίησας ἐν κρυφῇ, καὶ ἡ ὑπόστασίς μου ἐν τοῖς κατωτάτοις τῆς γῆς·
16	גׇּלְמִ֤י ׀ רָ֘א֤וּ עֵינֶ֗יךָ וְעַֽל־סִפְרְךָ֮ כֻּלָּ֢ם יִכָּ֫תֵ֥בוּ יָמִ֥ים יֻצָּ֑רוּ (ולא) [וְל֖וֹ] אֶחָ֣ד בָּהֶֽם׃	Thine eyes did see my substance, yet being unperfect; and in thy book all my members were written, which in continuance were fashioned, when as yet there was none of them.	τὸ ἀκατέργαστόν μου εἶδον οἱ ὀφθαλμοί σου, καὶ ἐπὶ τὸ βιβλίον σου πάντες γραφήσονται· ἡμέρας πλασθήσονται καὶ οὐθεὶς ἐν αὐτοῖς.
17	וְלִ֗י מַה־יָּקְר֣וּ רֵעֶ֣יךָ אֵ֑ל מֶ֥ה עָ֝צְמ֗וּ רָאשֵׁיהֶֽם׃	How precious also are thy thoughts unto me, O God! how great is the sum of them!	ἐμοὶ δὲ λίαν ἐτιμήθησαν οἱ φίλοι σου, ὁ Θεός, λίαν ἐκραταιώθησαν αἱ ἀρχαὶ αὐτῶν·
18	אֶ֭סְפְּרֵם מֵח֣וֹל יִרְבּ֑וּן הֱ֝קִיצֹ֗תִי וְעוֹדִ֥י עִמָּֽךְ׃	If I should count them, they are more in number than the sand: when I awake, I am still with thee.	ἐξαριθμήσομαι αὐτούς, καὶ ὑπὲρ ἄμμον πληθυνθήσονται· ἐξηγέρθην καὶ ἔτι εἰμὶ μετὰ σοῦ.
19	אִם־תִּקְטֹ֖ל אֱל֥וֹהַּ ׀ רָשָׁ֑ע וְאַנְשֵׁ֥י דָ֝מִ֗ים ס֣וּרוּ מֶֽנִּי׃	Surely thou wilt slay the wicked, O God: depart from me therefore, ye bloody men.	ἐὰν ἀποκτείνῃς ἁμαρτωλούς, ὁ Θεός, ἄνδρες αἱμάτων, ἐκκλίνατε ἀπ᾿ ἐμοῦ,
20	אֲשֶׁ֣ר יֹ֭מְרוּךָ לִמְזִמָּ֑ה נָשׂ֖וּא לַשָּׁ֣וְא עָרֶֽיךָ׃	For they speak against thee wickedly, and thine enemies take thy name in vain.	ὅτι ἐρισταί ἐστε εἰς διαλογισμούς· λήψονται εἰς ματαιότητα τὰς πόλεις σου.
21	הֲלֽוֹא־מְשַׂנְאֶ֖יךָ יְהֹוָ֥ה ׀ אֶשְׂנָ֑א וּ֝בִתְקוֹמְמֶ֗יךָ אֶתְקוֹטָֽט׃	Do not I hate them, O Lord, that hate thee? and am not I grieved with those that rise up against thee?	οὐχὶ τοὺς μισοῦντάς σε, Κύριε, ἐμίσησα καὶ ἐπὶ τοὺς ἐχθρούς σου ἐξετηκόμην;
22	תַּכְלִ֣ית שִׂנְאָ֣ה שְׂנֵאתִ֑ים לְ֝אוֹיְבִ֗ים הָ֣יוּ לִֽי׃	I hate them with perfect hatred: I count them mine enemies.	τέλειον μῖσος ἐμίσουν αὐτούς, εἰς ἐχθροὺς ἐγένοντό μοι.
23	חׇקְרֵ֣נִי אֵ֭ל וְדַ֣ע לְבָבִ֑י בְּ֝חָנֵ֗נִי וְדַ֣ע שַׂרְעַפָּֽי׃	Search me, O God, and know my heart: try me, and know my thoughts:	δοκίμασόν με, ὁ Θεός, καὶ γνῶθι τὴν καρδίαν μου, ἔτασόν με καὶ γνῶθι τὰς τρίβους μου.
24	וּרְאֵ֗ה אִם־דֶּֽרֶךְ־עֹ֥צֶב בִּ֑י וּ֝נְחֵ֗נִי בְּדֶ֣רֶךְ עוֹלָֽם׃	And see if there be any wicked way in me, and lead me in the way everlasting.	καὶ ἴδε εἰ ὁδὸς ἀνομίας ἐν ἐμοί, καὶ ὁδήγησόν με ἐν ὁδῷ αἰωνίᾳ.
