= Joachim Raabe =

German church musician and composer (born 1974)

- Born: 1974 (age 51–52); Haiger
- Education: Hochschule für Musik Detmold
- Occupations: Organist; Composer; Music editor
- Organizations: Diocese of Limburg; inTAKT

Joachim Raabe (born 1974) is a German church musician and a composer of sacred music, especially of the genre Neues Geistliches Lied.

== Career ==
Born in Haiger, Raabe studied church music from 1997 to 2002 at the Hochschule für Musik Detmold. He was then the church musician of the parish St. Peter und Paul in Villmar, and the leader of Tonspuren, a band of young people in Villmar. From 2005 to 2012, he was church musician of the Westerwälder Dom in Wirges. He was also until 2013 Geschäftsführer of the commission Arbeitskreis Kirchenmusik und Jugendseelsorge im Bistum Limburg of the Diocese of Limburg.

Raabe joined in 2013 the ecumenical association inTAKT for the support of Neues Geistliches Lied, art, culture and education, for which he has composed new songs and conducted events of continued education. He was editor, together with Patrick Dehm, of Weil der Himmel uns braucht, a song book for choir and band published by the Dehm Verlag in 2009.

His song "Glauben können wie du" on a text by Helmut Schlegel is included in the Catholic hymnal Gotteslob as GL 885 in the regional part for Limburg. The song was included in the oratorio Laudato with music by Peter Reulein, premiered in 2016.

== Selected works ==
- 2007
  - Die Welt in 7 Tagen, on a text by Dietmar Fischenich
  - Tohuwabohu, children's musical
  - Songs on texts by Eugen Eckert
  - "Aus deiner Hand"
  - "Komm uns nahe, Gott"
  - "You’ll receive the power – Ihr empfangt die Kraft"
- 2009
  - Farbigkeit steckt an Habakuk
  - Weil der Himmel uns braucht, song book for choir and band by Patrick Dehm and Raabe, Dehm Verlag, Lahn-Verlag
