= Dehm =

Dehm is a surname of German origin; people having the surname include:

- Diether Dehm (born 1950), German The Left-politician
- Jannik Dehm (born 2 May 1996), German professional footballer
- Patrick Dehm (born 1962), German Catholic theologian, supervisor and clinical Gestalt therapist
