= Ob ich sitze oder stehe =

- Christian poem and hymn
- Written: 1988
- Text: by Eugen Eckert
- Language: German
- Based on: Psalm 139
- Melody: by Torsten Hampel

"Ob ich sitze oder stehe" (Whether I sit or walk) is a Christian poem by Eugen Eckert, written in 1988, and made a hymn of the genre Neues Geistliches Lied with a melody and setting by Torsten Hampel the same year. It is based on Psalm 139. The song is also known by its refrain "Von allen Seiten umgibst du mich". It is included in song books and the Catholic hymnal Gotteslob.

== History ==
The poem was written by theologian and Protestant minister Eugen Eckert. It is in three stanzas with the refrain "Von allen Seiten umgibst du mich" (literally: You surround me on all sides). It is based on Psalms 139 which is paraphrased in the strophes, while verse 5 is quoted as the refrain.

The text has been set to music by Torsten Hampel. The hymn appears in the regional part of the Catholic hymnal Gotteslob of the Diocese of Limburg as GL 825. It is also part of Junges Gotteslob, the hymnal for young people.
