= Gott, der du warst und bist und bleibst =

Catholic hymn (2009); in German Catholic hymnal

- Christian hymn
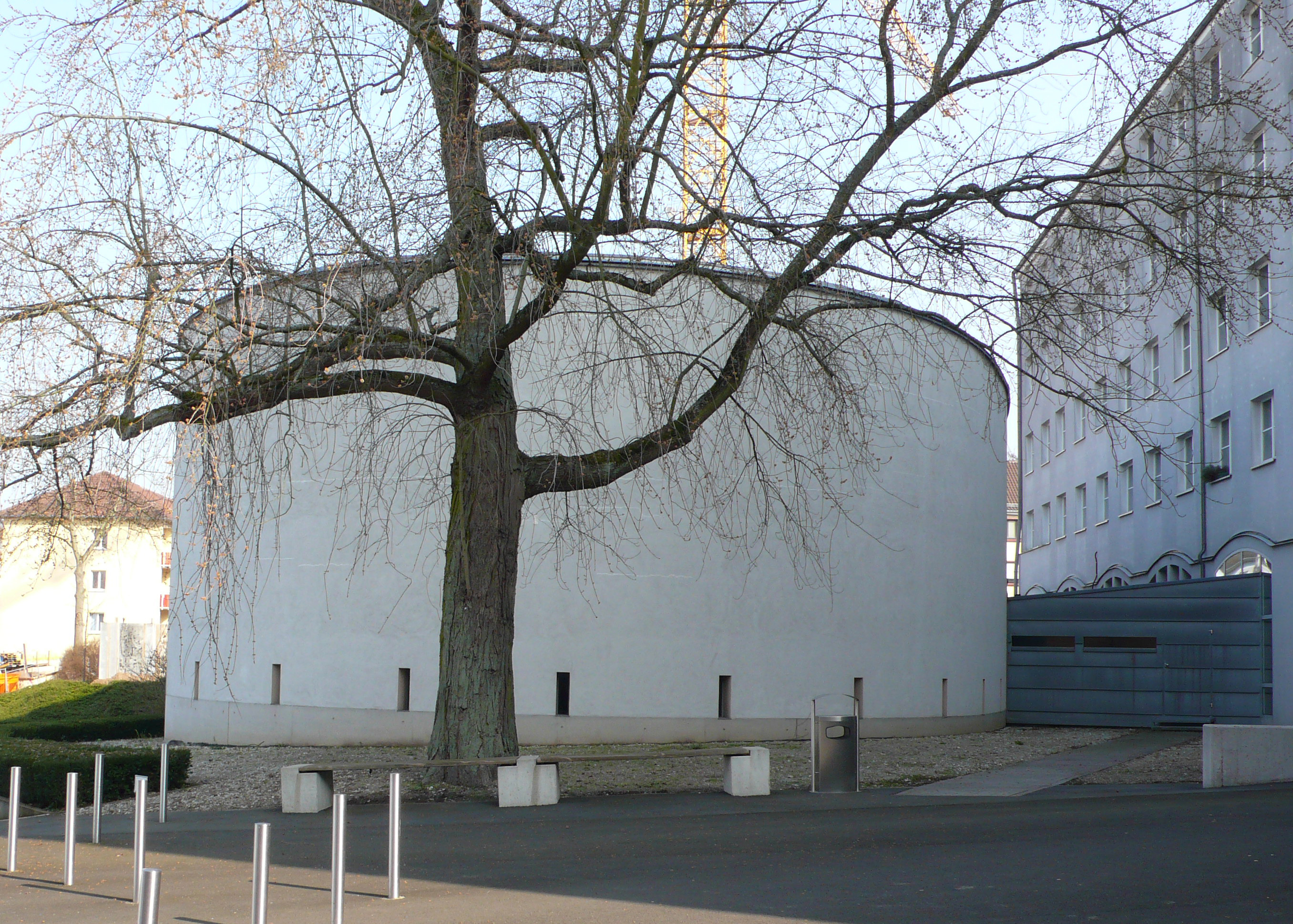
- Seminary Church of Sankt Georgen Graduate School of Philosophy and Theology
- Text: Eugen Eckert
- Language: German
- Melody: Herbert Heine
- Performed: 1993
- Published: 2013

"Gott, der du warst und bist und bleibst" (God, you who were and are and will be) is a Christian hymn with text by Eugen Eckert and a melody by Herbert Heine. It is also known by the title of its refrain, "Wir haben hier keine bleibende Stadt" (We have no lasting residence here). The song was written in 1993, in the genre Neues Geistliches Lied (NGL). It appears in several regional sections of the German Catholic hymnal Gotteslob, and in other songbooks.

== History and text ==
The hymn was written for the conclusion of a festive service for the inauguration of the new Seminary Church at the Sankt Georgen Graduate School of Philosophy and Theology in Frankfurt in 1993. It was the last part of a mass created for the occasion, the "Sankt Georgener Messe". The texts of all seven parts of the mass were written by Eugen Eckert, used for introit, Kyrie, Halleluja, intercessions, Sanctus, thanks, and conclusion. The concluding song is in four similar stanzas, each with four verse lines and four lines of refrain.

The song was first performed in the mass on 24 April 1993, with the choir and instrumental ensemble of Sankt Georgen conducted by the composer. It appears in regional parts of the German Catholic hymnal Gotteslob, as GL 916 for the Diocese of Freiburg, and as GL 847 for the Diocese of Limburg, in the section Segen (Blessing).

== Text and content ==
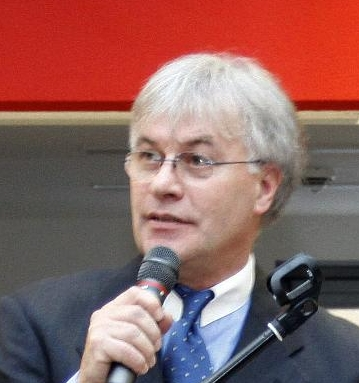
Eugen Eckert, who wrote the text, in Frankfurt in 2008

The text of the refrain is derived from the Letter to the Hebrews, speaking of no permanent place here but searching for a future place, which is a line also used by Johannes Brahms at the beginning of the sixth movement of Ein deutsches Requiem (Hebrews 13:14). A present church is a tent of meeting with God, a wording which was used in a papal central document of the Second Vatican Council, Lumen gentium, derived from a wording in Psalm 61:5a.

All verses address God in different images, followed by the repeated request "wohne unter uns, unter uns" (dwell among us, among us). The first verse requests faith, the second love, the third hope, the cardinal virtues. The fourth verse requests the coming of God's kingdom.

== Music ==
The melody and four-part setting were composed by Herbert Heine (born 1934). It is in D major and common time. The melody of the verses has many syncopes, suggesting free speech, while the refrain follows the regular beat. The last line of the melody, rising to the top note and returning, suggests the contour of a tent. The setting appears in the choral collection of NGL songs Vom Leben singen (Singing of Life).
