= Wo ein Mensch Vertrauen gibt =

- Christian poem and hymn
- Written: 1975
- Text: by Hans-Jürgen Netz
- Language: German
- Melody: by Winfried Heurich
- Composed: 1976

"Wo ein Mensch Vertrauen gibt" (Where a person gives trust) is a Christian hymn with text by Hans-Jürgen Netz, written in 1974, with a melody by Winfried Heurich and Fritz Baltruweit. The song of the genre Neues Geistliches Lied was included in hymnals and songbooks.

== History ==
The text was written by Hans-Jürgen Netz in 1974. The text has been set to music by Winfried Heurich and Fritz Baltruweit in 1974. The song has short stanzas of four lines each, all giving a condition, ending in the same two lines "fällt ein Tropfen von dem Regen / der aus Wüsten Gärten macht" (then a drop falls of the rain that turns deserts to gardens).

The song of the genre Neues Geistliches Lied was included in the German Catholic hymnal Gotteslob in 2013, in the Diocese of Limburg as GL 839. It became EG 638 in the Protestant hymnal Evangelisches Gesangbuch. It was also added to other songbooks including Junges Gotteslob, the hymnal for young people, and other collections for young people.
