= Bewahre uns, Gott =

Christian hymn

- Christian hymn
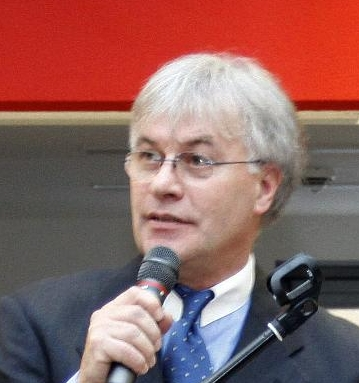
- Eckert in 2008
- English: Keep us, God
- Key: E minor
- Written: 1984
- Text: by Eugen Eckert
- Language: German
- Based on: "La paz del Señor"
- Meter: 5 5 8 5 5 8
- Melody: by Anders Ruuth
- Composed: 1968
- Performed: 1985
- Published: 1987

"Bewahre uns, Gott" ("Keep us, God") is a Christian hymn with text by Eugen Eckert to a melody from Argentina, of "La paz del Señor". The song of the genre Neues Geistliches Lied, a prayer for protection in hard times, is contained in several hymnals and songbooks ecumenically. Several of these list it as "Bewahre uns, Gott, behüte uns, Gott".

== History ==
The text "Bewahre uns, Gott" was written by the Protestant theologian and pastor Eugen Eckert from Frankfurt, who has taken care of students, the football stadium, and those outcast by society. He wrote the song as a Neues Geistliches Lied (NGL) in 1984, revised for publication in 1987. Eckert was inspired by a song with text and melody by Anders Ruuth, a Swedish theologian who worked in Argentina. Ruuth created "La paz del Señor" (The Peace of the Lord) in 1968, in three stanzas in collaboration with students, for the liturgical sign of peace emphasised by the Second Vatican Council.

Eckert used the melody, but wrote a free text focused on God's blessing and protection. His version first appeared on a 1985 recording of the band Habakuk, for which he mainly wrote his texts. It was printed in Limburg in 1987 in a collection of NGL songs for Lent.

"Bewahre uns, Gott" is especially suitable for benediction and conclusion of church services. It was included in the Protestant hymnal Evangelisches Gesangbuch as EG 171, and in the second edition of the Catholic hymnal Gotteslob as GL 453 in 2013, in the section "Leben in Gott – Segen" (Life in God – Blessing). The song is contained in hymnals for young people and in several songbooks.

== Text and theme ==
The text is in four stanzas of six lines each, rhyming AABCCB, with the second half repeated. It is written in the first person plural, as a prayer for blessing and protection on a journey and in hard times. The first two lines are the same for all stanzas: "Bewahre uns, Gott, behüte uns Gott", requesting God to keep and guard us. In three stanzas, the third longer lines name situations in which protection is needed, first "on our ways" ("auf unseren Wegen") which can mean travel but also the ways in life, then "in all suffering" ("in allem Leiden"), and last "from every evil" ("vor allem Bösen"), which comes from the last petition in the Lord's Prayer. The fourth and fifth lines, rhyming for emphasis, name something expected in the situation. In the ways of life, God is requested to be "a spring and bread in the desert" ("Quelle und Brot in Wüstennot"), referring to his past protection during the Exodus, and also to Jesus saying "I am the bread of life." In suffering, God is requested to be "warmth and light in our face" ("Wärme und Licht im Angesicht"), derived from the Aaron's blessing traditionally spoken at the end of Lutheran services. To protect from evil, God is requested to be "help and strength creating peace" (sei Hilfe, sei Kraft, die Frieden schafft). The last lines of each stanza address God again to be around us with blessing. The final stanza prays that the Holy Spirit, promising life ("Dein Heiliger Geist, der Leben verheißt") be around us.

== Melody ==
Ruuth's melody is in E minor in a triple metre. Depending on the situation, it can be sung slow and heavily, or fast and dance-like. It is simple and covers the range of an octave, beginning with the lowest note. The highest register is reached at the beginning of the second half, when the visions of bread, light and strength are expressed.
