= Ich glaube an den Vater =

- Christian hymn
- English: I believe in the Father
- Occasion: Creed
- Text: by Markus Pytlik
- Language: German
- Melody: by Markus Pytlik
- Published: 2013

"Ich glaube an den Vater" (I believe in the Father) is a Christian hymn with text and music by Markus Pytlik. The song of the genre Neues Geistliches Lied has appeared in the German Protestant and Catholic hymnals and in songbooks.

== History ==
Markus Pytlik wrote the text of the hymn "Ich glaube an den Vater" and also composed the melody. "Ich glaube an den Vater" was written to take the place of the creed in church services.

The song became part of regional parts of the German Catholic hymnal Gotteslob in the 2013 edition; in the Diocese of Limburg, it is GL 793 and No. 202 in the Jugolo version for young people, in the Diocese of Mainz, it is GL 836, and in the Diocese of Würzburg GL 790. It is also included in 16 songbooks, as of 2026, including collections for young people.

== Text and theme ==
The text of "Ich glaube an den Vater" is in four stanzas in eight lines each. The last phrase of all stanzas is the same, "Ich glaube daran" (I believe this). It is a paraphrase of the Apostles' Creed, with the first three stanzas are dedicated to the three persons of the Trinity, while the fourth is focused on communion. As the model, the text is written in the first person.
