= Lamm Gottes, für uns gegeben =

- Christian hymn
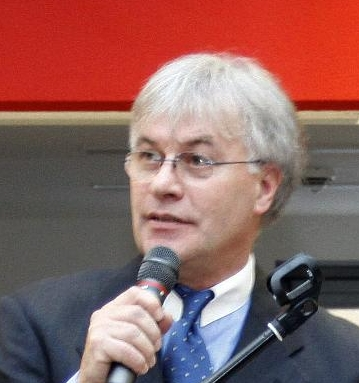
- Eugen Eckert in 2008
- English: Lamb of God, given for us
- Text: by Eugen Eckert
- Language: German
- Melody: by Horst Christill
- Published: 1975

"Lamm Gottes, für uns gegeben" (Lamb of God, given for us) is a Christian hymn in German with text by Eugen Eckert and a tune by Horst Christill. It is of the genre Neues Geistliches Lied. The song reflects the liturgical Agnus Dei. It is part of regional sections of the common German Catholic hymnal.

== History, text and music ==
The Protestant theologian and pastor Eugen Eckert from Frankfurt wrote the text of "Lamm Gottes, für uns gegeben". Eckert and the composer Horst Christill are regarded as prolific authors of songs of Neues Geistliches Lied (New sacred song). The song appeared in the first common German Catholic hymnal Gotteslob in 1975 in the regional section for the Diocese of Limburg as GL 986, and is contained in its second edition there as GL 740. In the Diocese of Hildesheim, it is part of the second edition as GL 767. The song is part of other hymnals and songbooks.

As in the liturgical Agnus Dei, the Lamb of God is addressed three times, in three stanzas of four lines each. In all three stanzas, the third line begins also with "Lamm Gottes". The first two stanzas, as in the liturgy, end in a call to have mercy. The tune was composed by Horst Christill. The melody is in F major. The range is from low C to high C.
