= Mit dir, Maria, singen wir =

- Christian hymn
- Written: 1994
- Text: Eugen Eckert
- Language: French; German
- Melody: by Jean-Claude Gianadda

"Mit dir, Maria, singen wir" (With you, Mary, we sing) is a Christian hymn. The original text was written in French; it was translated into German by Eugen Eckert in 1994. The hymn of the genre Neues Geistliches Lied with a melody by Jean-Claude Gianadda paraphrases the Magnificat. The song is included in Protestant and Catholic hymnals and songbooks.

== History ==
The text of Mit dir, Maria, singen wir was written in French; it was translated into German by the Protestant pastor and social worker Eugen Eckert in 1994. It is in four stanzas with a refrain that opens the song. The song paraphrases the Magnificat. While many Marian hymns are sung to Mary, this song is sung in solidarity with her Magnificat, as the refrain indicates.

The text was set to music by Jean-Claude Gianadda. The melody is in B major and common time, in the style of a chanson.

The song is part of Junges Gotteslob, the Catholic hymnal for young people, and of songbooks. It was included in several regional sections of the Catholic hymnal Gotteslob in 2013.
