= Wäre Gesanges voll unser Mund =

Christian hymn

- Christian hymn
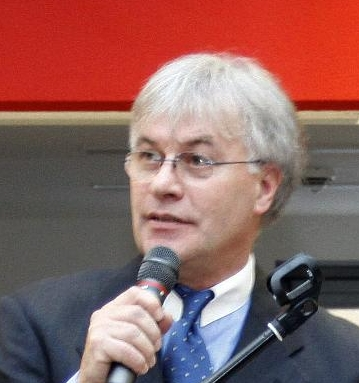
- Eugen Eckert in 2008
- English: If our mouth were full of song
- Written: 1999
- Text: by Eugen Eckert
- Language: German
- Melody: by Alejandro Veciana
- Performed: 1999

"Wäre Gesanges voll unser Mund" (If our mouth were full of song) is a Christian hymn with text by Eugen Eckert, written in 1999, and a melody by Alejandro Veciana. The text is derived from a Jewish text. A hymn of the genre Neues Geistliches Lied, it is part of regional sections of the common German Catholic hymnal Gotteslob, and of other songbooks.

== History ==
The text of "Wäre Gesanges voll unser Mund" was written by the Protestant theologian and minister Eugen Eckert from Frankfurt, derived from a prayer in Hebrew, "Nischmat Kol Chaj" from Festtägliches Gebetbuch (the Frankfurt Haggadah) of 1892. The melody was created the same year by Alejandro Veciana. It was first published in the choral collection Die Zeit färben (Colour the time). It was intended to preserve memory of Jewish life in Frankfurt.

The song, of the genre Neues Geistliches Lied, appeared in regional sections of the common German Catholic hymnal Gotteslob, in the Diocese of Limburg as GL 814. It is part of many other hymnals and songbooks.

== Text and music ==
The song "Wäre Gesanges voll unser Mund" is in four stanzas which all end with the same four lines that express that however we try to praise God, it is still not enough to cover his greatness ("so reichte es nicht, dich, Gott, unsern Gott, recht zu loben", in English: "it would still not suffice to praise you, God, our God, in the right way"). The beginning four lines of the stanzas imagine ways to praise God, in the first stanza songs filling the mouth like the sea and its roaring, in the second stanza sparkle in the eyes and dancing feet, in the third stanza hands stretched out like eagles wings, and in the last stanza trying to name all occurrences of Gods goodness.

The melody by Veciana begins in E minor and a 6/8 metre. Most phrases begin with a long note of 3 or more often 4 eighth notes, followed by movements in eighth notes. The refrain is in G major, but ends openly. The repeated call in the refrain, "dich, Gott" ("you, God") is a leap upwards of a fifth to D, the highest note which is held for more than one measure.
