= Fürwahr, er trug unsre Krankheit =

Christian hymn

- Christian hymn
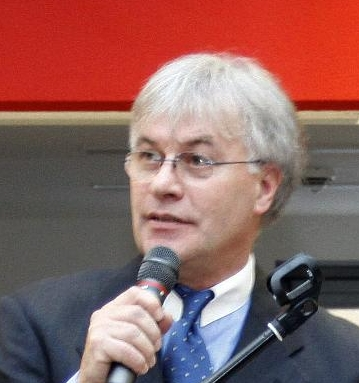
- Eugen Eckert in 2008
- English: Yet it was our sickness that he was bearing
- Occasion: Holy Week
- Written: 1986
- Text: by Eugen Eckert
- Language: German
- Melody: from Chile

"Fürwahr, er trug unsre Krankheit" ("Yet it was our sickness that he was bearing") is a Christian hymn of the genre Neues Geistliches Lied with text written by Eugen Eckert in 1987 to a melody from Chile. It is based on a passage from the Book of Isaiah. It is part of hymnals, including the German Catholic hymnal Gotteslob as GL 292, and songbooks.

== History ==
"Fürwahr, er trug unsre Krankheit" was written in 1986 by the Protestant theologian and minister Eugen Eckert from Frankfurt, revised in 1987. The text is based on Isaiah 53:4–5, a servant song. It is intended for the Holy Week.

The melody in E minor is from Chile. The song is part of the German common Catholic hymnal Gotteslob as GL 292. It is part of other hymnals and songbooks, including the choral collection for children Freiburger Kinderchorbuch 2, published in 2020 by the Diocese of Freiburg and Carus-Verlag.

== Musical settings ==
Andreas Großmann composed a four-part choral setting (SATB) of hymn text and melody in 1994. Werner Quicker wrote a three-part choral setting of the hymn text and melody. Johannes Matthias Michel composed a choral setting of Eckert's text for four-part choir and organ, published by Strube Verlag in 2013.
