= Möge die Straße uns zusammenführen =

Contemporary Christian hymn

- Christian hymn
- Written: 1988
- Text: by Markus Pytlik
- Language: German
- Based on: Irish blessings
- Melody: by Markus Pytlik
- Composed: 1988

"Möge die Straße uns zusammenführen" (May the road make us meet) is a Christian hymn written in 1988 with German text by Markus Pytlik based on Irish blessings. He also composed the melody. The song, of the genre Neues Geistliches Lied (NGL), is part of German hymnals, including regional sections of the Catholic Gotteslob, and songbooks including ecumenical collections.

== History ==
Markus Pytlik wrote "Möge die Straße uns zusammenführen" in 1988, in an effort to express faith in contemporary texts and music in a genre later known as Neues Geistliches Lied (NGL). He said that he returned from vacation in Ireland in 1988 with souvenirs including a postcard with the Irish travel blessing "May the road rise to meet you", and a booklet of other Irish toasts. He tried to set the translated travel blessing to music, but realised that the text was too long for a round, and too short for a song. He therefore wrote it as a first stanza, and added thoughts from the other toasts, using the end of the blessing as a refrain.

Pytlik wrote an English version at the same time. The song was first performed in groups, later distributed in photocopies. It became known all over Germany. The song was included in regional sections of the German Catholic hymnal Gotteslob, such as GL 852 in the Diocese of Limburg and GL 833 in the Diocese of Cologne. The song is part of several songbooks, including ecumenical collections.

== Text, music and use ==
The theme of the song is blessings for someone departing for travel. It is written in four stanzas of four lines each, expressing thoughts of blessing such as for a road in permanent downhill, soft rain, and warm thought when it gets cool. Not without humour, the third stanza wishes 40 years in heaven before the devil even notices that the person is dead. Each stanza ends with a refrain of 2 lines which are repeated: "Und bis wir uns wieder sehen, halte Gott dich fest in seiner Hand" (And until we see each other again, may God hold you tight in his hand).

The melody is not inspired by Irish models but Pytlik's invention. Set in F major and common time, it features many lively eighth-notes. Lines 3 and 4 are very similar to lines 1 and 2. The refrain begins differently in lines 5 and 6, but the repetition of the text (lines 7 and 8) is repeated to exactly the melody of 3 and 4.

The song is used particularly in situations of departure and separation, including the end of gatherings and even funerals. A YouTube video of Die Priester reached millions of views. The song title became the title of choral settings of similar songs. In a 2021 survey for favourite songs wanted for the next edition of the Protestant German hymnal, the song reached position 4.
