= Meine engen Grenzen =

Poem

- Christian poem and hymn
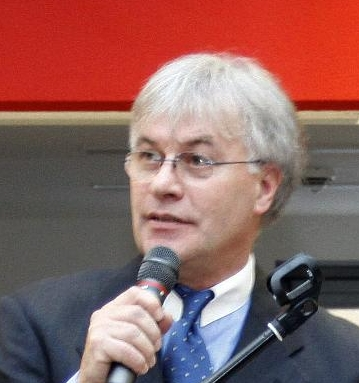
- Eugen Eckert in 2008
- English: My narrow limits
- Written: 1981
- Text: by Eugen Eckert
- Language: German
- Melody: by Winfried Heurich
- Performed: 1981

"Meine engen Grenzen" ("My narrow limits") is a Christian poem by Eugen Eckert, written in 1981, and made a hymn of the genre Neues Geistliches Lied with a melody and setting by Winfried Heurich the same year. The song, bringing one's shortcomings and limitations before God and praying for a broader perspective, is part of the common German Protestant and Catholic hymnals, and of other songbooks.

== History ==
The poem was written by the Protestant theologian and minister Eugen Eckert from Frankfurt, who has taken care of students, the football arena, and persons outcast by society. He wrote the text when he, as minister of a home for girls in difficult circumstances, was unable to help one of the girls. The topic is bringing one's shortcomings before God and praying for a broader perspective.

Eckert and Heurich are regarded as prolific authors of songs of Neues Geistliches Lied (New sacred song), and "Meine engen Grenzen" as one of their most successful songs. It became part of the Protestant hymnal Evangelisches Gesangbuch, in Baden-Württemberg as EG 589, and in Rheinland / Westfalen / Lippe as EG 600. It also appears in the German common Catholic hymnal Gotteslob as GL 437, in the section Bitte and Klage (request and lament). The song is part of many other hymnals and songbooks.

== Text and music ==
In the four stanzas of four lines each, "Herr, erbarme dich" (Lord, have mercy) is the final line in every stanza, which is the German version of the liturgical Kyrie eleison, Christe eleison of the mass, a regular part of also of Protestant church services. The singer speaks in the first person, beginning each first line, and most of the second lines, with meine ("my"), and then mentioning something limiting and troubling. The second line always ends bringe ich vor dich (I bring before you). The third line always begins with the request Wandle sie in ... (transform them to ...) and then mentions one positive term. In the first stanza, narrow limits and a short sight (kurze Sicht) are hoped to be transformed to broadness (Weite), in the second stanza, powerlessness (Ohnmacht) and things paralyzing (was mich lähmt) to strength, in the third stanza, lost confidence (verlornes Zutraun) and anxiety to warmth, and finally deep longing for comfort to be transformed to a sense of home (Heimat). The song is suitable as a song of penitence, specifically for the Kyrie of the mass.

The text has been set to music by Winfried Heurich. The melody is in D, undecided if D minor or Doric mode. The range is from low D to high D. The melody begins in the middle, on A, repeated twice and then moving downward in even steps for the first line, in a bowing motion. For the second line, the melody rises step by step to A again, but in faster notes in irregular rhythm. The melody of the third line, carrying the prayer for transformation, is similar to the beginning but intensely from the highest note. The fourth line, the plea for mercy, is similar to the beginning in both rhythm and range, bringing the song to rest on a long D. Lines 3 and 4 of each stanza are repeated.

It was recorded in 2003 on a collection Halte deine Träume fest (hold on to your dreams), a performance by the band Habakuk of all songs from a songbook of the same name by the Dehm-Verlag. In 2006, Gerhard Fleischer created a different melody and composed settings for choir, and for voice with organ or piano.
