= InTAKT =

inTAKT is a German ecumenical association (Verein) for the promotion of new Christian songs for church services (Neues Geistliches Lied, NGL), and of art, culture and musical education. Its members are mostly hymnwriters and composers interested in NGL.

== Foundation and program ==
Patrick Dehm and Eugen Eckert founded the association, together with other authors and composers of NGL, on 8 April 2013. Dehm became president, Eckert vice president, Annette Kreuzer and Thomas Gabriel were on the board, among others. The association is ecumenical and open to all lyricists and composers of NGL.

The name refers to the earlier group TAKT, short for TextAutor/innen- und Komponist/innen-Tagung (Convention of text authors and composers), which was founded in 1947 and took the name in 1997. Takt is also the German word for the musical measure, and intakt means intact.

The association supports continued musical education and the creation of new songs for church services. It supports hymnwriters, composers, artists, choirs and bands, by workshops, sheet music and coaching. It is interested in interaction between the generations, beginning with children's and youth groups, and in a singing congregation at church.

Composers collaborating with inTAKT include Alexander Bayer, Dietmar Fischenich, Hans Florenz, Gabriel, Winfried Heurich, Jürgen Kandziora, Kai Lünnemann, Joachim Raabe, Dominik Sahm and Stephan Sahm. Authors include Eckert, Bayer, Fischenich and Lutz Riehl.

The association took over the organisation of the Tag des Neuen Geistlichen Liedes (Day of NGL), an annual event in spring in Wetzlar from 1998, and an educational event on Spiekeroog during fall vacation, which began in 1997. Beginning in 2014, an annual workshop has been held in Bad Tölz during Easter vacation.

== Publications ==
The association published Die Träume hüten (Shepherd the dreams), a song book for choirs and bands with more than 200 songs. Several of the authors' songs have been included in choir books and Christian hymnals, such as the Catholic Gotteslob and the Protestant Evangelisches Gesangbuch.
