= Eingeladen zum Fest des Glaubens =

Christian hymn

- Christian hymn
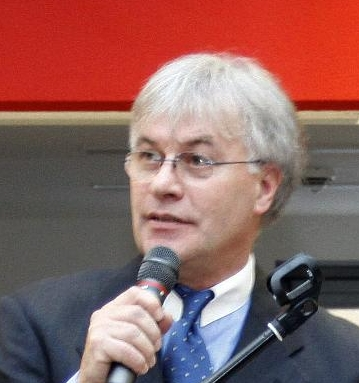
- Eugen Eckert in 2008
- English: Invited to the feast of faith
- Written: 1989
- Text: by Eugen Eckert
- Language: German
- Melody: by Alejandro Veciana
- Performed: 1989

"Eingeladen zum Fest des Glaubens" (Invited to the feast of faith) is a Christian hymn with text by Eugen Eckert, written in 1989, and a melody by Alejandro Veciana. It is also known by the first line "Aus den Dörfern" (From the villages). A hymn of the genre Neues Geistliches Lied, it is part of regional sections of the common German Catholic hymnal Gotteslob, and of other songbooks.

== History ==
The text of "Eingeladen zum Fest des Glaubens" was written in 1989 by the Protestant theologian and pastor Eugen Eckert from Frankfurt. The melody was created the same year by Alejandro Veciana. It was first published by Strube Verlag.

The song, of the genre Neues Geistliches Lied, appeared in regional sections of the common German Catholic hymnal Gotteslob, in the Diocese of Limburg as GL 714. It is part of many other hymnals and songbooks.

== Text and music ==
The song "Eingeladen zum Fest des Glaubens" is in four stanzas and the refrain "Eingeladen zum Fest des Glaubens, which is repeated. The text tells of people who followed Jesus in the past, which is turned in the last stanza to include "us" in the presence.

The melody by Veciana is in G major and common time. It begins in a low register, moving with syncopes. The refrain begins with long notes in the upper register.
