= Habakuk (band) =

Habakuk is a German pop band from Frankfurt, formed in 1975. The group is focused on new Christian music of the genre Neues Geistliches Lied.

== History ==
The "Liturgical Night" of the 1975 Kirchentag with Peter Janssens inspired the founding members to seek their own paths in the field of contemporary Christian music. Eugen Eckert, a founding member, has been involved with the band as a lyricist and musician from the beginning. He was a physics student at the beginning but changed to studying theology. The band is focused on music of the genre Neues Geistliches Lied, with content such as the responsibility for peace, justice and the environment. The band promotes ecumenism.

The band played at a regional Kirchentag in Frankfurt first in 1977, followed by many appearances at the convention of the Protestant Church in Germany. For the 1977 performance, the band was named after the Biblical Habakuk, whom Eckert described as a social prophet with a vision of life within a society. Eckert began writing song lyrics in 1979, such as "Halte deine Träume fest" (Hold on to your dreams). The song "Eingeladen zum Fest des Glaubens" (Invited to a fest of faith) was performed by thousands for the visit of Pope Benedict XVI in Berlin. The band celebrated its 40th anniversary in 2015 with a concert in Frankfurt and a new CD, Einfach so with 45 songs.

== Songs and songbooks ==
Habakuk has published over 1,000 congregational hymns and recital songs texted by Eckert. The hymns are kept simple, for the congregation to sing along, while the songs for recitals rely on the virtuosity of the instrumentalists. In 1993, the Habakuk song "Bewahre uns, Gott" (Keep us safe, God) was included in common Protestantn hymnal Evangelisches Gesangbuch as EG 171. Several Habakuk songs were included in the 2013 edition of the common Catholic hymnal Gotteslob, including "Bewahre uns, Gott" (GL 453), "Fürwahr, er trug unsre Krankheit" (Verily, he bore our sickness, GL 292) and "Meine engen Grenzen" (My narrow limits, GL 437).

Many other Habakuk songs were included in regional sections of the official hymnals, as well as into the hymnals of the Gesangbuch der Evangelisch-reformierten Kirchen der deutschsprachigen Schweiz (Zürich 1998), the Gesangbuch der Evangelisch-methodistischen Kirche (Stuttgart 2002), the Evangelische Brüdergemeinde (Basel 2007) and the Bund Freier evangelischer Gemeinden (Holzgerlingen 2003).

Extensive compilations of songs appear in three hymnals:

1. Durch Hohes und Tiefes, songbook of students' parishes in Germany (Munich 2008)
2. Ein Segen sein - Junges Gotteslob (Limburg 2011)
3. Breath of Life, hymnal with 333 songs by Hessian poets and hymnodists of the 20th and 21st century (Munich 2014).

The song "Lebendig und kräftig und schärfer" was the theme song of the 2007 Kirchentag in Cologne. They then released an album Mehr als Liebe (More than love), including the song. The title of the CD Wo bist du? (Where are you?) takes the motto of the Kirchentag 2009 in Bremen. As of 2021, the band has released 18 albums and CDs.

== Members ==
The current line-up of Habakuk are Eckert and seven professional musicians who also play in other formations. They have played together from 2005.

- Laura Doernbach, vocals
- Doro Rosenzweig, vocals
- Eugen Eckert, vocals
- Raphael Wolf, saxophone
- Jan Koslowski, guitar
- Andreas Neuwirth, piano and organ
- Christoph Maurer, percussion
- Klaus Bussalb: bass guitar

Former members include keyboard player and composer Horst Christill, singer Conny Kollet, and guitarist, singer and composer Alejandro Veciana.
