= Eins (oratorio) =

Oratorio

- Ökumenisches Oratorium
- Oratorio by: Peter Reulein; Bernhard Kießig
- Occasion: Ökumenischer Kirchentag 2021
- Text: Eugen Eckert; Helmut Schlegel
- Language: German; Latin
- Based on: Biblical texts
- Performed: 14 May 2021
- Published: 2021 Dehm Verlag
- Scoring: soprano; alto; tenor; bass; mixed choir; jazz band orchestra

Eins (One or United) is an oratorio written on a commission from the Ökumenischer Kirchentag 2021 in Frankfurt, Hesse, Germany, the third ecumenical convention of lay Christians of different denominations in Germany. The text was written jointly by the Protestant pastor Eugen Eckert and the Catholic Franciscan Helmut Schlegel. The music of many genres was composed by Peter Reulein for the more traditional parts and by Bernhard Kießig for jazz and pop elements. The work is subtitled Ökumenisches Oratorium in vier Bildern für Solisten, Chor, Orchester und Band (Ecumenical Oratorio in four scenes for soloists, choir, orchestra and band).

The oratorio was published in 2021 by the Dehm Verlag. The premiere, planned to be in a football arena with audience participation, had to happen without audience due to the COVID-19 pandemic. A film of a shortened version was produced as a livestream, and first presented on 14 May 2021 as part of the Kirchentag.
