= Clemens Bittlinger =

German Protestant minister, author and songwriter

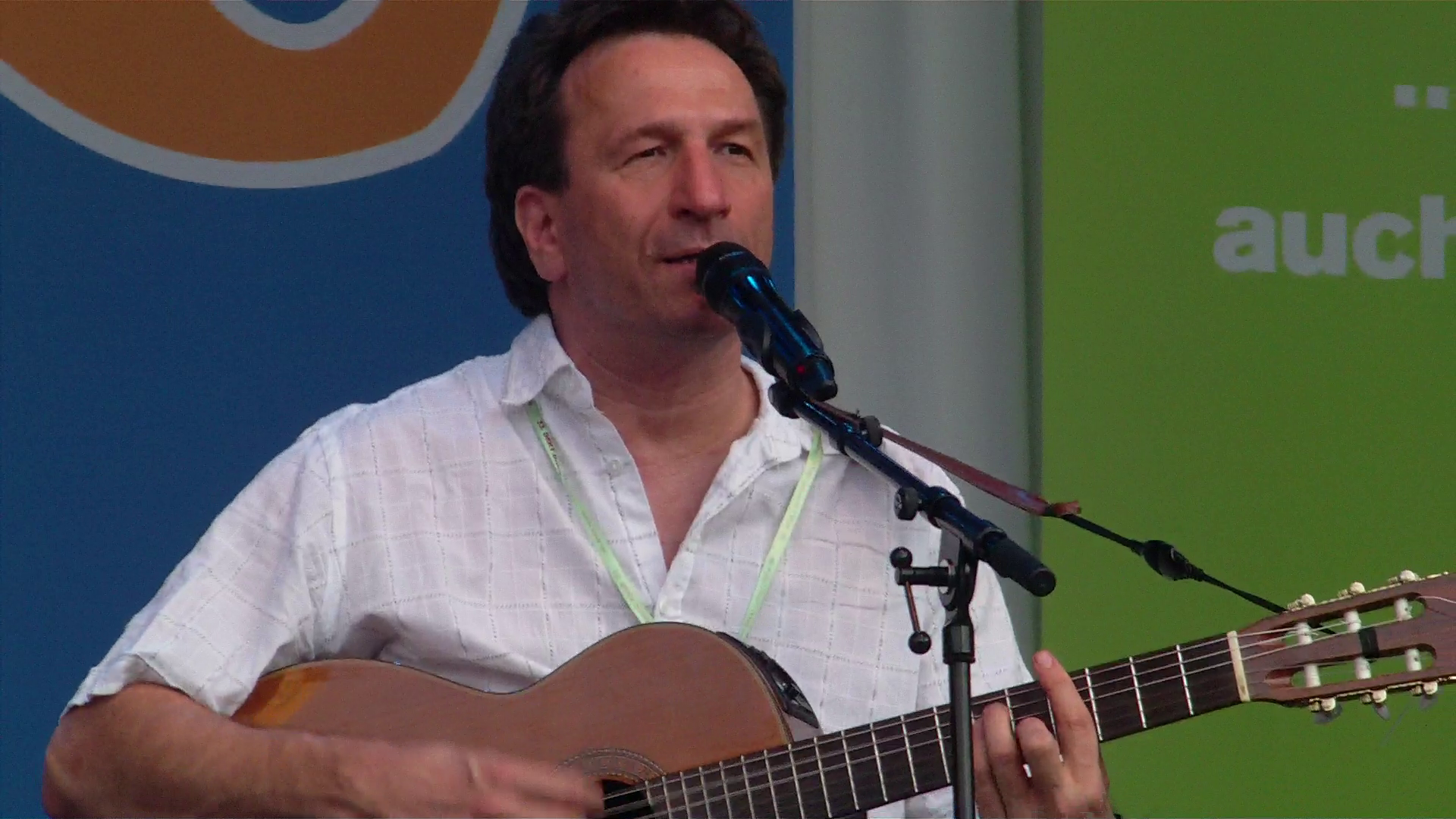
- Clemens Bittlinger performing at the German Evangelical Church Congress in Dresden, June 2011
- Church: Protestant Church in Hesse and Nassau

Personal details
- Born: 8 August 1959 Mannheim, Baden-Württemberg, West Germany

Clemens Bittlinger (born 8 August 1959) is a German Protestant minister, author of books as well as a song writer of religious-themed songs (German: Neues Geistliches Lied, NGL) and children's songs in German.

== Life ==
Clemens Bittlinger was born in 1959 in Mannheim, Baden-Württemberg, West Germany. He was brought up with three siblings in Germany and the United States, moving around to places where his father was a priest. Inspired by the guitarist John Pearse, he started to play the guitar when he was 14. He also started to write his own songs; and in 1978 he recorded four of them on his first EP.

While working on his first LP Mensch, bist Du's wirklich, he met the Swiss pianist and producer of music, David Plüss - with whom Bittlinger is still performing together at some concerts. In the beginning of the 1980s Bittlinger studied theology in Mainz und Erlangen and was also a member of the choir Aufwind. Already in these days, Bittlinger gave around 100 to 120 concerts per year. In 1990 he finished his studies and was ordained a priest for the Evangelische Kirche in Hessen und Nassau, where he was given the special task to work on the musical-cultural mission of the church.

Bittlinger is married to Rosi and has two children.

=== Threats ===
In mid-September 2008, German-speaking and English-speaking media reported that Bittlinger was receiving police protection following threats received over a song, Mensch, Benedikt, in which he addressed ecumenical concerns as a fellow Christian to Pope Benedict XVI.

A report in Der Spiegel said that the South Hesse Police Directorate confirmed that one August concert by Bittlinger in Odenwald had had police protection. The weekly news magazine also reported that the song had been the subject of many angry posts in "rechtskonservativen katholischen Internet-Seiten" (right-wing conservative Catholic websites).

== Works ==
=== Famous songs ===
- Auf dem Weg der Gerechtigkeit (DEKT 97)
- Aufstehn, aufeinander zugehn
- Gott spannt leise feine Fäden
- So soll es sein
- Ihr seid das Salz (DEKT 99)
- Kostbare Momente
- Sanna sannanina
- Schritte wagen
- Sei behütet
- Suchen und Finden

=== Recordings ===
- Mensch bist Du's wirklich? (1981)
- Jeder Mensch braucht einen Menschen (1983)
- Schwer zu sagen (1987)
- Mensch sing mit (1988)
- Fenster in die Nacht (1990)
- Selten (1993)
- Mensch sing mit 2 (1994)
- Auf der Grenze (1996)
- Lieder vom Kirchentag (1997)
- Aus heiterem Himmel (1998)
- Ich bin...Worte Jesu (1999)
- Clemens Bittlinger & Freunde: LIVE (with David Plüss and Helmut Kandert) (2000)
- Hellhörig (2001)
- Kinder-Wunder-Welt (2001)
- Ihr sollt ein Segen sein (2002)
- Bilder der Weihnacht (2003)
- Liebe macht sehend (2003) (Single with Joy Fleming)
- Fingerspitzengefühle (2004)
- Wie im Himmel (Buch/2006)
- Mit den Augen eines Kindes (2006) (with Anselm Grün)
- Bilder der Passion (2006)
- Das wünsch ich mir – Clemens Bittlinger & Freunde (2006)
- Gott tut gut (2007) – book & CD
- Perlen des Glaubens (2007)
- Fridays for Future (2019)
