= Tefilat HaDerech =

Jewish prayer for a safe journey

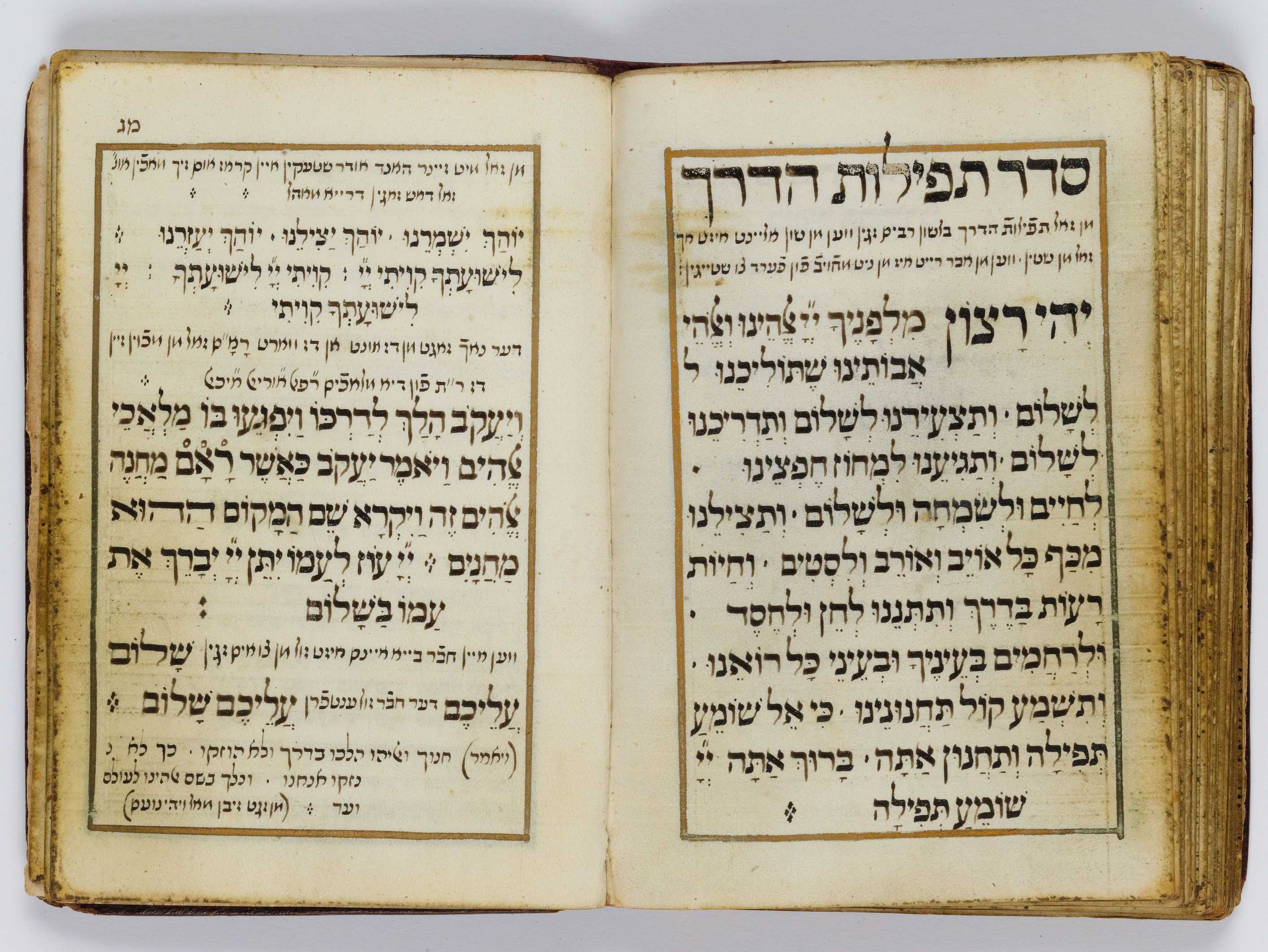
Book of Tefilat HaDerech

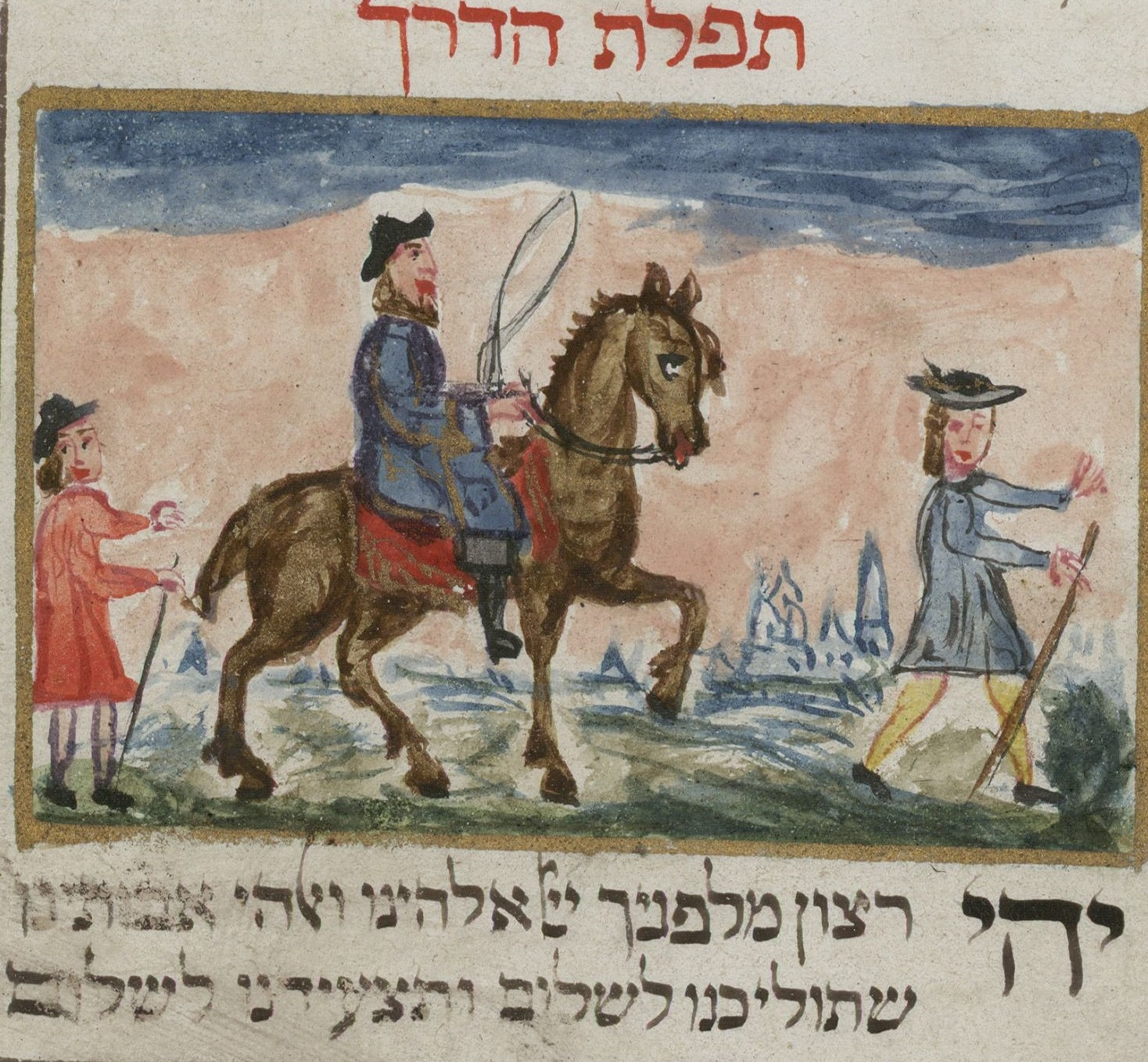
Tefilat HaDerech in a siddur from Fürth, 1738

Tefilat HaDerech (Hebrew: תפילת הדרך) or the Traveler's Prayer or Wayfarer's Prayer in English, is a prayer for a safe journey recited by Jews, when they travel, by air, sea, or even on long car trips. It is recited at the onset of every journey, and preferably done standing but this is not necessary. It is often inscribed onto hamsas which sometimes contain the Sh'ma or Birkat HaBayit prayer instead.

== Text ==
יְהִי רָצוֹן מִלְּפָנֶיךָ ה' אֱ-לֹהֵינוּ וֵא-לֹהֵי אֲבוֹתֵינוּ, שֶׁתּוֹלִיכֵנוּ לְשָׁלוֹם וְתַצְעִידֵנוּ לְשָׁלוֹם. וְתִסְמְכֵנוּ לְשָׁלוֹם. וְתַדְרִיכֵנוּ לְשָׁלוֹם. וְתַגִּיעֵנוּ לִמְחוֹז חֶפְצֵנוּ לְחַיִּים וּלְשִֹמְחָה וּלְשָׁלוֹם וְתַצִּילֵנוּ מִכַּף כָּל אוֹיֵב וְאוֹרֵב וְלִסְטִים וְחַיּוֹת רָעוֹת בַּדֶּרֶךְ וּמִכָּל מִינֵי פֻּרְעָנִיּוֹת הַמִּתְרַגְּשׁוֹת לָבוֹא לָעוֹלָם וְתִשְׁלַח בְּרָכָה בְּכָל מַעֲשֵֹה יָדֵינוּ, וְתִתְּנֵנוּ לְחֵן וּלְחֶסֶד וּלְרַחֲמִים בְעֵינֶיךָ וּבְעֵינֵי כָל רוֹאֵינוּ וְתִשְׁמַע קוֹל תַּחֲנוּנֵינוּ. כִּי אֵ-ל שׁוֹמֵעַ תְּפִלָּה וְתַחֲנוּן אָתָּה: בָּרוּךְ אַתָּה ה', שׁוֹמֵעַ תְּפִלָּה.

Y'hi ratzon milfanekha A-donai E-loheinu ve-lohei avoteinu she-tolikhenu l'shalom v'tatz'idenu l'shalom v'tismekhu l'shalom v'tadrikhenu l'shalom, v'tagi'enu limhoz heftzenu l'hayim ul-simha ul-shalom. V'tatzilenu mi-kaf kol oyev v'orev v'listim v'hayot ra'ot ba-derekh, u-mi-kol minei pur'aniyot ha-mitrag'shot la-vo la-olam. V'tishlah b'rakha b'khol ma'a'se yadeinu v'tit'nenu l'hen ul-hesed ul-rahamim b'einekha uv-einei khol ro'einu. V'tishma kol tahanuneinu ki E-l sho'me'a t'fila v'tahanun ata. Barukh ata A-donai sho'me'a t'fila.

"May it be Your will, Lord, our God and the God of our ancestors, that You lead us toward peace, guide our footsteps toward peace, that we are supported in peace, and make us reach our desired destination for life, gladness, and peace. May You rescue us from the hand of every foe and ambush, from robbers and wild beasts on the trip, and from all manner of punishments that assemble to come to earth. May You send blessing in our handiwork, and grant us grace, kindness, and mercy in Your eyes and in the eyes of all who see us. May You hear the sound of our humble request because You are God Who hears prayer requests. Blessed are You, Lord, Who hears prayer."

== Origins ==
A variant of the prayer can be found in the Babylonian Talmud (Berachot 29b-30a). The Bavli version is written for the protection of a single individual, but the sage Abaye counseled merging one's individual need with that of the community. The modern text is accordingly written in the plural; some, however, hold that "and give me favour, generosity and mercy in Your eyes and the eyes of all who see me" should be said in the singular.

כל היוצא לדרך צריך להתפלל תפלת הדרך. מאי תפלת הדרך? יהי רצון מלפניך ד' אלקי שתוליכני לשלום ותצעידני לשלום ותסמכני

לשלום, ותצילני מכף כל אויב ואורב בדרך, ותשלח ברכה במעשי ידי, ותתנני לחן לחסד ולרחמים בעיניך ובעיני כל רואי, ברוך אתה ד'

שומע תפלה. אמר אביי: לעולם לישתף אינש נפשיה בהדי צבורא.

"One who travels must recite tefilat haderech. What is tefilat haderech? "May it be Your will, my Gd, that You lead me towards peace, direct my steps toward peace, support me toward peace, and rescue me from the hand of any enemy or ambush on the way, and send blessing upon my handiwork, and give me favour, generosity and mercy in Your eyes and the eyes of all who see me. You are blessed, Gd, who listens to prayer." Abaye said: One should always merge himself with the community."

== Laws ==
From Kitzur Shulchan Aruch 68:1

Tefilat HaDerech - the traveler's prayer - cannot be said before one has left the city limits; defined as 70 2/3 Amot (~35 meters / ~0.02 mi) after the last house.

Preferably it should be said one "Miel" (~1 km / ~0.6 mi) from the city limit.

When overnighting on a multi-day trip, one says Tefilat HaDerech before leaving for the day.

== Media ==
- YouTube Video - IDF Soldiers recite prayer for a safe journey (Tefilat HaDerech) in their tank.

== In popular culture ==
An excerpted version of the prayer is recited in Series 1, Episode 1 of the series Away.

Character Marissa Gold recites the prayer at the end of Season 6, Episode 4, of the series The Good Fight.
