= Anne Quigley =

Anne Quigley (born 1955 or 1956) is a British composer and Catholic liturgist who is best known for her vocal composition "There is a Longing" for which she wrote text and music.

Quigley was born in Yorkshire. She was a member of the St. Thomas More Group of composers, which was associated with the parish of St. Thomas More in north London from 1969 to 1995. Quigley also served as a musician at the parish of Deptford in southeast London with another Yorkshire musician, Bernadette Farrell.

Quigley's music has been published in the Decani Choral Music Series, and by Oregon Catholic Press. Her vocal compositions include:

- "Do Not Delay"
- "Easter Litany"
- "Father, Forgive Them"
- "For Justice, for Freedom, for Mercy"
- "Take, Lord, and Receive"
- "The Lord is with You"
- "The Seven Last Words from the Cross"
- "There is a Longing"
- "This is Our God"
