= There is a longing =

1965 song

- Christian hymn by Anne Quigley
- Written: 1973
- Text: by Quigley
- Published: 1992

"There is a longing" is a 1973 Christian hymn with text and music by Anne Quigley. It has appeared from 1992 in hymnals in English, and also in German from 1999, translated by Eugen Eckert to "Da wohnt ein Sehnen tief in uns".

== History ==
The English composer and hymn writer Anne Quigley wrote the lyrics and the melody in 1973. It was published by Oregon Press Publications in 1992, and in several hymnals.

=== Translations ===
In 1999 Eugen Eckert translated the song into German under the title "Da wohnt ein Sehnen tief in uns". It became part of several hymnals and songbooks, including the regional addition EG Plus to the common Protestant hymnal Evangelisches Gesangbuch as EG+102 and regional sections of the common Catholic hymnal Gotteslob.

== Text, theme and music ==
The text is in four stanzas; the refrain about a longing in the group of singers opens the song, while the stanzas express prayers for specific desired situations such as peace and freedom. The longing for God's presence comes from sorrow and hurt, helplessness and anxiety regarding the future in a presence full of wars and dangers. The melody has been described as soft and tender, the opposite of battle songs.
