= Birkat HaBayit =

Jewish prayer for the home

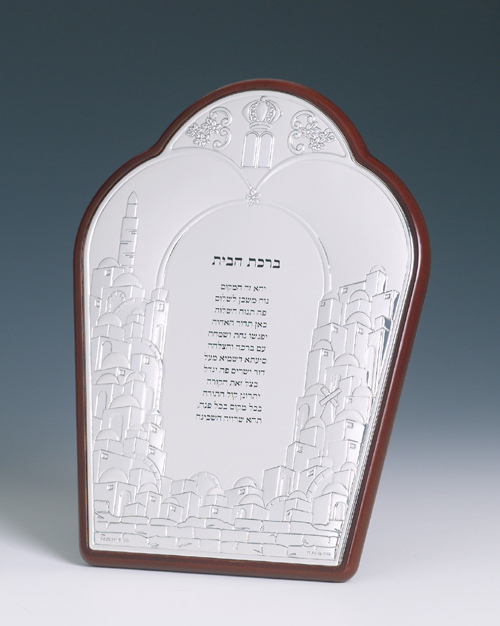
An engraved plaque with a version of the blessing

Birkat HaBayit (Hebrew: ברכת הבית, meaning Blessing for the Home) is a Jewish prayer often inscribed on wall plaques or hamsas and featured at the entrance of some Jewish homes. There are various versions of the prayer.

== Text ==
Hebrew
בִּרְכַּת הָבָּיִת:
בְּזֶה הַשַּׁעַר לֹא יָבוֹא צַעַר.
בְּזֹאת הַדִּירָה לֹא תָבוֹא צָרָה.
בְּזֹאת הַדֶּלֶת לֺא תָבוֹא בֶּהָלָה.
בְּזֹאת הַמַּחְלָקָה לֺא תָבוֹא מַחְלוֺקֶת.
בְּזֶה הַמָּקוֺם תְּהִי בְרָכָה וְשָׁלוֺם.
Transliteration

Birkat habayit:
Bezeh ha shaˁar lo yavo tzaˁar.
Bezot haddirah lo tavo tzarah.
Bezot haddelet lo tavo bahalah.
Bezot hammaḥlaqah lo tavo maḥloqet.
Bezeh hammaqom tehi b'rakhah v'shalom.

English Translation

Blessing for the home:
Let no sorrow come through this gate.
Let no trouble come in this dwelling.
Let no fright come through this door.
Let no conflict come to this department.
Let there be blessing and peace in this place.

In the home, the Birkat Habayit is traditionally hung on the wall next to the front door or next to a window: it is meant to drive any evil spirits out of the house and protect the occupants within. Besides bringing a blessing upon the home, variations from around the world are also seen as brilliant works of art and are often given as housewarming gifts.

A Birkat HaEsek (ברכת העסק), "Blessing for the Business," is also popular in Israel.

== Origin ==
There are conflicting theories as to the origin of this prayer.

=== Moshe Teitelbaum ===
There is a variation of it that appears in an amulet for protection against plague. This amulet is from 1925 and is attributed to Rebbe Moshe Teitelbaum.

=== Modern Hebrew poetry ===
According to Rabbi Shlomo Aviner, the style of this prayer is not Jewish, as it has no "Yehi Ratzon" or "Ribbon Ha'Olamim" and does not address God in any way. He postulates that this prayer originates from a poem created by Rudyard Kipling, although there is no proof of this claim.

== See also ==
- Mezuzah
