= Ökumenischer Kirchentag 2021 =

logo

The Ökumenischer Kirchentag 2021 (Ecumenical Church Assembly) was the third ecumenical convention of lay Christians of different denominations in Germany. It was held in Frankfurt, Hesse from 13 to 16 May 2021. Due to the COVID-19 pandemic, the event happened mostly digitally, with only a few events actually taking place with live audience in Frankfurt.

== History ==
The first Ökumenischer Kirchentag was held as a national ecumenical event, in the spirit of the Protestant Kirchentag and the Catholic Katholikentag, both a national convention of lay Christians in Germany held every other year, alternating. The first ecumenical Kirchentag was held in Berlin in 2003. The second Ökumischer Kirchentag was in Munich in 2010.

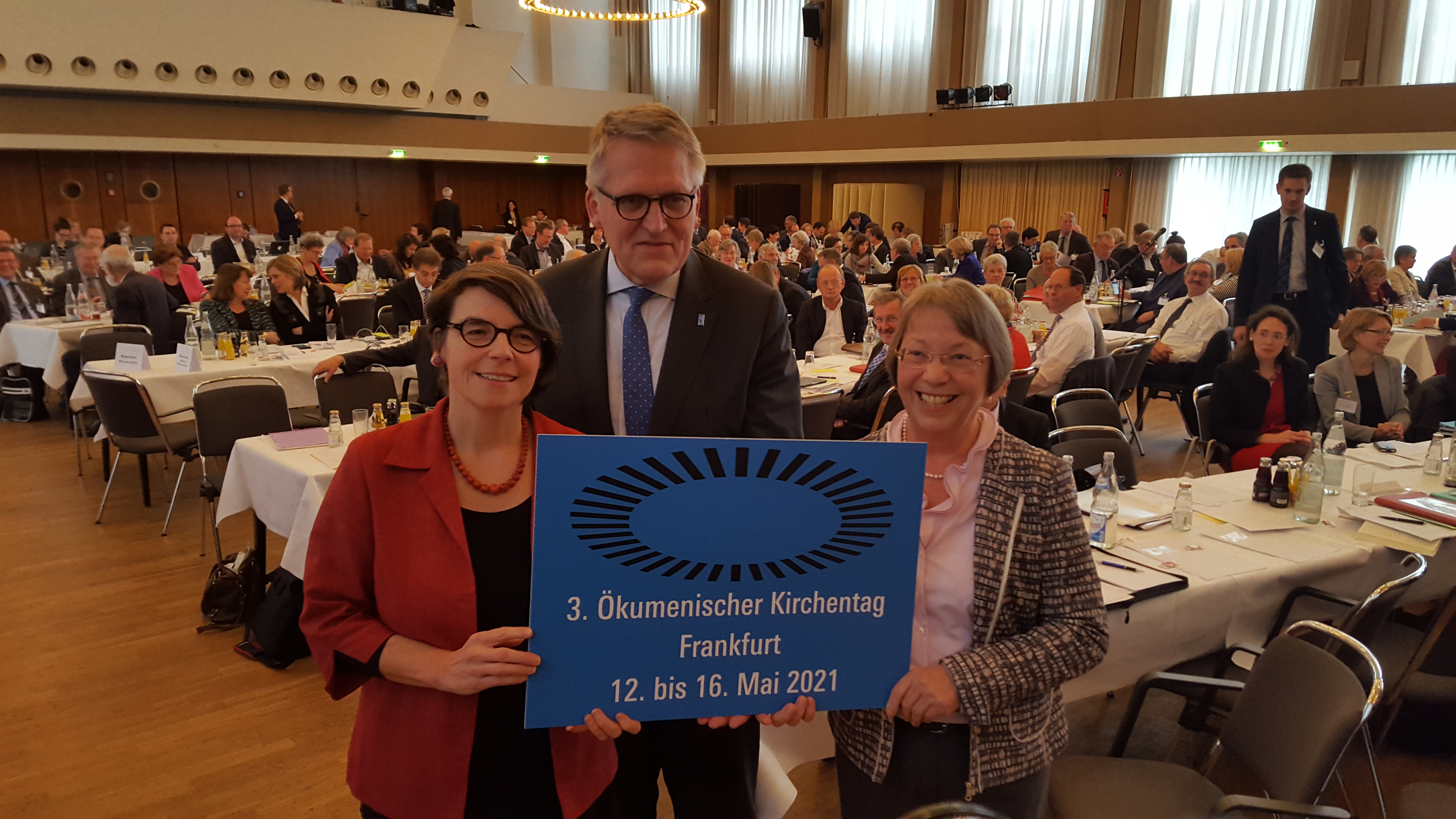
Invitation to the 3. Ökumenischer Kirchentag in Frankfurt

Im November 2011, a synod of the Protestant Church in Hesse and Nassau (EKHN) declared to the Deutscher Evangelischer Kirchentag (DEKT) to be willing to host a Kirchentag in Frankfurt in 2021. The city had been the location for the Protestant Kirchentag four times before, in 1956, 1975, 1987 and 2001. The EKHN-affiliated churches reserved money for the purpose in 2012. If the Diocese of Limburg was willing, the EKHN supported an ecumenical event. After Volker Jung and the Bishop of Limburg, Georg Bätzing invited to support an ecumenical event, the decision for Frankfurt as location for the third Ökumenischer Kirchentag was made in November 2016, at the closing ceremony of the 101st Katholikentag in Münster. An official invitation to a third event in Frankfurt was given in 2018 by the two church bodies, who formed a joint planning unit. They expected more than 100.000 participants. An association, "3. Ökumenischer Kirchentag Frankfurt 2021", was founded then, responsible for legal, financial and organisational matters.

The joint presidency (Gemeinsames Präsidium) responsible for the content planning first met in December 2018, formed by 43 persons elected by the churches and other organisations. The Protestant president was Bettina Limperg, and the Catholic president Thomas Sternberg. An office was formed in Frankfurt in mid-2019, to coordinate the preparations. In response to the COVID-19 pandemic, an announcement was given on 22 September 2020 that the Kirchentag would take place in modified form to conform with the necessary hygiene concept. On 16 December 2020, the presidency decided to shorten the event by one day and to avoid mass gatherings completely, organise the event mostly digitally, with only a few events actually taking place with live audience and participation in Frankfurt. The event was to be framed by an opening service on 13 May (Ascension Day) and a closing service on Sunday, 16 May. Saturday was supposed to present a focused, completely digital program. Saturday evening was planned for smaller services in local churches, "ökumenisch sensibel gestaltete" (with sensitivity for ecumenical aspects).

=== Theme and program ===
Limperg and Sternberg announced the motto for the event 26 October 2019: "schaut hin" (look), taken form the Gospel of Mark.

The program was structured around four topics:

1. Glaube, Spiritualität, Kirche (faith, spirituality, church)
2. Lebensräume, Lebenswelten, Zusammenleben (life areas, worlds of life, living together)
3. Schöpfung, Frieden, Weltgemeinschaft (creation, peace, world community)
4. Wirtschaft, Macht, Verantwortung (business, power, responsibility)

=== Oratorio Eins ===
On Friday, 14 May, the world premiere of the ecumenical oratorio Eins (One) was performed as a livestream. It was commissioned for the event, with texts by Eugen Eckert and Helmut Schlegel, and music by Bernhard Kießig and Peter Reulein.
