= Ein =

Ein or EIN may refer to:

== Science and technology ==
- Ein function, in mathematics
- Endometrial intraepithelial neoplasia, a lesion of the uterine lining
- Equivalent input noise, of a microphone
- European Informatics Network, a 1970s computer network

== Fictional characters ==
- Ein, a character in the anime series Cowboy Bebop
- Ein, a character in the video game series Dead or Alive
- Ein, the protagonist of the Game Boy Advance game Riviera: The Promised Land

== Other uses ==
- Aer Lingus (ICAO code), the flag carrier airline of Ireland
- Eindhoven Airport (IATA code), in the Netherlands
- Employer Identification Number, assigned by the US Internal Revenue Service
- EPODE International Network, a Belgian obesity organization
