= Friedenskirche, Stuttgart =

Lutheran church in Stuttgart, Germany

Friedenskirche
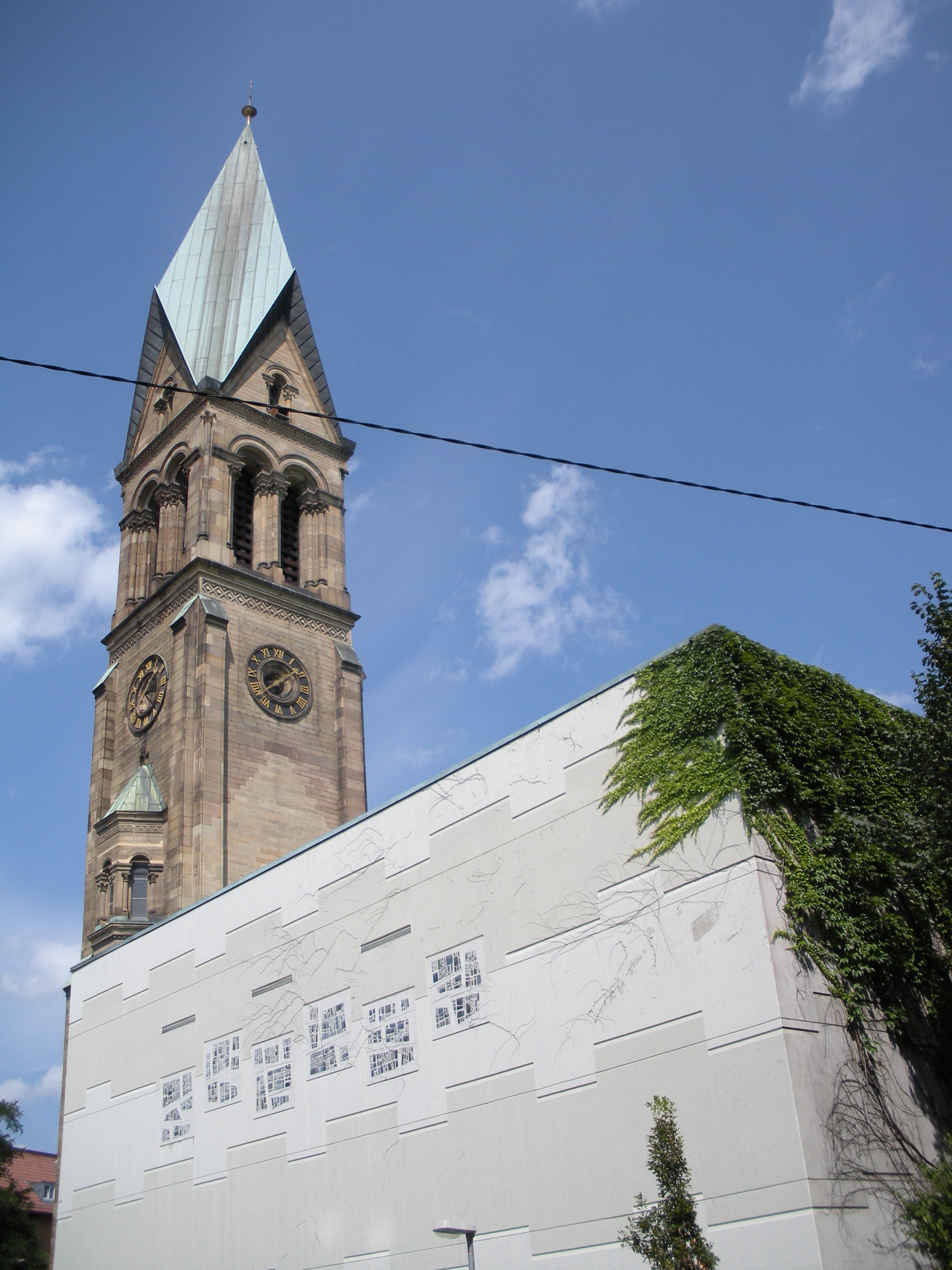
- Friedenskirche in 2008
- Friedenskirche
- 48°47′10″N 09°11′33″E
- Location: Friedensplatz, Stuttgart, Baden-Württemberg, Germany
- Denomination: Lutheran
- Website: www.friedenskirche-stuttgart.de

History
- Consecrated: 11 December 1892

Architecture
- Style: Romanesque Revival; Modern

Administration
- Diocese: Evangelische Landeskirche in Württemberg

Friedenskirche (Peace Church) is a Lutheran church in Stuttgart, Baden-Württemberg, Germany, and the parish church of the Evangelische Friedensgemeinde Stuttgart. The first church, in neo-Romanesque style was consecrated in 1892. Destroyed during World War II, with the exception of the tower, it was rebuilt in the 1960s in concrete, and consecrated anew in 1966. The church also serves as a concert venue.

== History ==
=== First Friedenskirche ===
The first Friedenskirche was built for the Lutheran parish in the centre of Stuttgart from 1890 in neo-Romanesque style, with a double choir and narrow gallery and ceiling supported on wooden columns, to designs by architect Conrad Dollinger, and consecrated on 11 December 1892. The tower, in the middle of the nave, was decorated with sculptures of apostles and Christ blessing.

The church, except for the tower and enclosing walls, burnt out and collapsed after bombing on 19 October 1944, during World War II.

=== New Friedenskirche ===
The church was initially left in ruins, with only the tower still intact; for the holding of services, the large hall in the parish centre was remodelled. In 1959, the parish council decided to commission a new church building. The 1960 competition was won by architect Eberhard Hübner. After the dynamiting in 1962 of the remaining sandstone walls of the former building, construction began in 1964. Although the architect favoured the use of natural stone, the parish decided on concrete, making it the first church in Stuttgart to be built using this material. The new church was built with a flat roof, and the tower topped with a metal helmet. Consecrated in 1966 with enough space for 700 worshippers, the church also serves a Korean parish and a Nambu parish.

The church features a pipe organ by Richard Rensch, and is a popular concert venue. In 2020, Volker Lutz wrote a book about the organ. A gospel choir holds monthly concerts.

== See also ==
- Kaiser Wilhelm Memorial Church
