= Eugen Eckert =

German social worker and minister

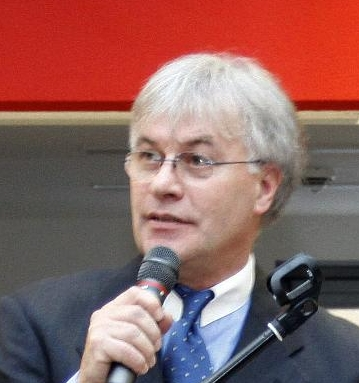
- Eckert in Frankfurt in 2008
- Born: 1954 (age 71–72); Frankfurt am Main
- Education: Frankfurt University; Mainz University
- Occupations: social worker; minister; singer-songwriter; academic teacher
- Organizations: Hochschule für Musik und Darstellende Kunst Frankfurt am Main; inTAKT

Eugen Eckert (born 1954) is a German social worker, minister, singer-songwriter and academic teacher. He is known for his lyrics for new spiritual songs (Neues Geistliches Lied), and his oratorios and musical plays.

== Career ==
Born in Frankfurt am Main, Eckert first worked as a social worker. He studied from 1977 Protestant theology, pedagogic psychology and Slavic languages at the Frankfurt University and the Mainz University. In 1990 he became the pastor of the Protestant parish of Offenbach-Lauterborn. He has been a pastor for students (Studentenpfarrer) of the Frankfurt University since 1996, and is the pastor of the stadium Commerzbank-Arena. He has also worked for broadcasters and wrote books. From 1993 to 2013 he lectured at the Hochschule für Musik und Darstellende Kunst Frankfurt am Main.

Eckert wrote from 1976 lyrics of Neues Geistliches Lied, producing more than thousand songs, ten oratorios, several Singspiele and cantatas. He was in 1975 founding member of the band Habakuk, for which he has worked as songwriter, singer and manager. Eckert was active in the Arbeitskreis Kirchenmusik und Jugendseelsorge im Bistum Limburg from 1980. When Franz-Peter Tebartz-van Elst, then the bishop, dismissed its president Patrick Dehm as director of the "Haus der Begegnung", Eckert resigned to express his protest.

Eckert is a founding member and vice president of the ecumenical association inTAKT, founded on 8 April 2013 to promote Neues Geistliches Lied.

== Selected works ==
Eckert wrote the lyrics for more than 1000 songs of the genre Neues Geistliches Lied, oratorios and musical plays. Several songs have been included in the Protestant hymnal Evangelisches Gesangbuch and the Catholic hymnal Gotteslob.

=== Oratorios ===
- Hiob, 1994, music: Jürgen Blume
- Daniel, 1996, music: Thomas Gabriel
- Emmaus, 2002, music: Gabriel
- Simeon, 2007, music: Gabriel
- Eleasar, 2008, music: Gerd-Peter Münden
- Junia, 2010, music: Gabriel
- Und dann war Licht, 2013, Merseburger Orgeltage, music: Gabriel
- Maria, 2014, music: Gabriel, premiered 29 March 2014, Evangelische Friedenskirche, Ratingen
- Feuerzungen, 2014, music: Peter Reulein, premiered 7 June 2014, Liebfrauen, Frankfurt
- So lang hier stehet Stein auf Stein, 2016, in memory of 350 years plague in Flörsheim
- Bruder Martin, 2017, Luther oratorio, music: Gabriel, premiered on 17 September 2017, open air in Tecklenburg
- Eins, 2021, Ecumenical oratorio for Ökumenischer Kirchentag 2021, text with Helmut Schlegel

=== Songs ===
- "Besser als ich noch", 1999, music: Horst Christill
- "Bewahre uns, Gott", music: Anders Ruuth
- "Da wohnt ein Sehnen tief in uns", translation of "There is a longing" by Anne Quigley
- "Eingeladen zum Fest des Glaubens", music: Alejandro Veciana
- "Einst warst du, Gott, uns gnädig", music: Gerd-Peter Münden
- "Fürwahr, er trug unsre Krankheit", music: from Chile
- "Gott, deine Liebe reicht weit", music: Winfried Heurich
- "Gott, der du warst und bist und bleibst", music: Herbert Heine (1993)
- "Gott hat mir längst einen Engel gesandt", music: Thomas Gabriel
- "Heilig, der da war", music: Heine
- "Ich lasse dich nicht", music: Reulein, song competition of the Ökumenischer Kirchentag in Berlin 2003
- "Jesus Christus, Sohn des Lebens", music: Peter Reulein
- "Jesus, Gottes Lamm", music: Reulein
- "Lamm Gottes, für uns gegeben", music: Christill
- "Meine engen Grenzen", music: Heurich and Gerhard Fleischer
- "Mit dir, Maria, singen wir" (1994, translation), music: Jean-Claude Gianadda
- "Noch ehe die Sonne am Himmel stand" (1991, after Psalm 90), music: Sergej A. Bazuk
- "Ob ich sitze oder stehe ("Von allen Seiten umgibst du mich"), music: Torsten Hampel
- "Sehnsucht nach dem ganz Anderen", music: Ludger Stühlmeyer
- "Seht, Brot und Wein, music: Reulein
- "Stille, finde mich", music: Christill
- "Wäre Gesanges voll unser Mund", music: Veciana
- "Was mein Herz schwer macht", music: Jürgen Kandziora
- "Weite Räume meine Füßen", music: Veciana
- "Wir haben seinen Stern gesehen", music: Reulein
- "Wo die Liebe wohnt", music: Veciana
