= Winfried Heurich =

German organist and composer

- Born: 13 February 1940 (age 86); Neuhof, Hesse
- Occupations: Director of church music; Composer; Academic teacher
- Organizations: Liebfrauen, Frankfurt; Frankfurt University of Music and Performing Arts

Winfried Heurich (born 13 February 1940) is a German organist and composer. He was director of church music at Liebfrauen, Frankfurt from 1966 to 2000 and composed music for more than 400 songs.

== Life ==
Born in Neuhof, Hesse, He took piao lessons from age 10 and organ lessons from age 12. He studied church music at the Musikhochschule Frankfurt from 1962, graduating in 1966. He then became director of church music at Liebfrauen in Frankfurt, holding the position to 2000. In 1973 he composed songs titled Ganz nah ist dein Wort, with new texts by Huub Oosterhuis and Lothar Zenetti. From 1978, he composed many songs on lyrics by Eugen Eckert.

From 1974 to 2000 he led the Arbeitskreis Kirchenmusik und Jugendseelsorge im Bistum Limburg. He lectured at the Musikhochschule Frankfurt from 1986 to 1997.

His song "Der Herr wird dich mit seiner Güte segnen", to a text by Helmut Schlegel, was the most successful German entry to an international competition of the genre Neues Geistliches Lied in 1983 in Rome. He also composed the official song of the Katholikentag 1998 in Mainz, "Schnee schmilzt" (Snow melts) on a text by Eckert.

=== Songs ===
- "Der Himmel, der ist", 1980, text: Kurt Marti
- "In uns kreist das Leben", 1987, text: Marti
- "Meine engen Grenzen", 1981, text: Eugen Eckert
- "Der Herr wird dich mit seiner Güte segnen", text: Helmut Schlegel
- "Gott, deine Liebe reicht weit", text: Eckert
- "Menschenkind, im Stall geboren", text: Eckert
- "Gebt Zeugnis von der Hoffnung", 1998, text: Eckert
- "Wunder der Nacht", 1997, text: Eckert
- "Schnee schmilzt", 1998, text: Eckert, official song for the Katholikentag 1998 in Mainz
- "Was sein wird", text: Lothar Zenetti
- "Wir sprechen verschiedene Sprachen", 1972, text: Zenetti
- "Meines Herzens Dunkel", text: Schlegel
- "Rosen blühn im Stacheldraht", text: Schlegel
- "Es bleibt dabei", 1996, text: Arnim Juhre
- "wir messen mit knospenden zweigen", text: Wilhelm Willms
- "Wo ein Mensch Vertrauen gibt", 1975, text: Hans-Jürgen Netz
- "Aus der Armut eines Stalles", text: Juhre
