= Horst Christill =

German church musician, composer and cantor

- Born: 1959 (age 66–67); Annweiler am Trifels
- Education: Musikhochschule Saarbrücken; Johannes Gutenberg-Universität Mainz
- Occupations: Pianist; Church musician; Composer
- Organizations: Habakuk

Horst Christill (born 1959) is a German church musician and composer of sacred music, especially hymns of the genre Neues Geistliches Lied (NGL).

== Life and career ==
Born in Annweiler am Trifels, Christill first studied from 1976 music pedagogy, focused on piano, at the Musikhochschule Saarbrücken, completing with the concert exam in 1983. He then studied Catholic church music at the Johannes Gutenberg-Universität Mainz, completing with the A exam in 1988. He was church musician in Dornburg-Frickhofen, working also as Bezirkskantor for the district within the Diocese of Limburg. He was pianist and keyboard player of the band Habakuk from 1995 to 1999, recording several albums.He was church musician at the Wetzlar Cathedral which is used by a Catholic parish and a Protestant parish, from 1996 to 2018, again also as Bezirkskantor. He was also a member of the group for church music aimed at young people in the diocese. From 2019, Christill has worked at the Marienkirche in Landau, also as Dekanatskantor and responsible for Neues Geistliches Lied (NGL) in the Diocese of Speyer.

== Work ==
Christill composed the music for many new hymns by Eugen Eckert, including:

- "Besser als ich noch" (1999)
- "Deinen Weg"
- "Der Engel sprach"
- "Es ist Zeit, Gott, hohe Zeit"
- "Frieden ist der alte Traum", 1999
- "Gib mir die Ohren der Hirten"
- "Heilig ist Gott, mein Halt" (1999)
- "Hirten gebt Acht"
- "In deinen Händen steht die Zeit"
- "Lamm Gottes, für uns gegeben"
- "Noch ist es Nacht"
- "Offen für dein Kommen"
- "Sei behütet Tag und Nacht"
- "Stille, finde mich"
- "Tausend Sterne oder mehr"
- "Über Gott nur reden"
- "Und dann sing ich"
- "Und dann warst du da"
- "Wege zur Krippe"
- "Weil der Himmel uns braucht"
- "Wir bitten für alle mit kraftlosen Händen"
