= Patrick Dehm =

German publisher (born 1962)

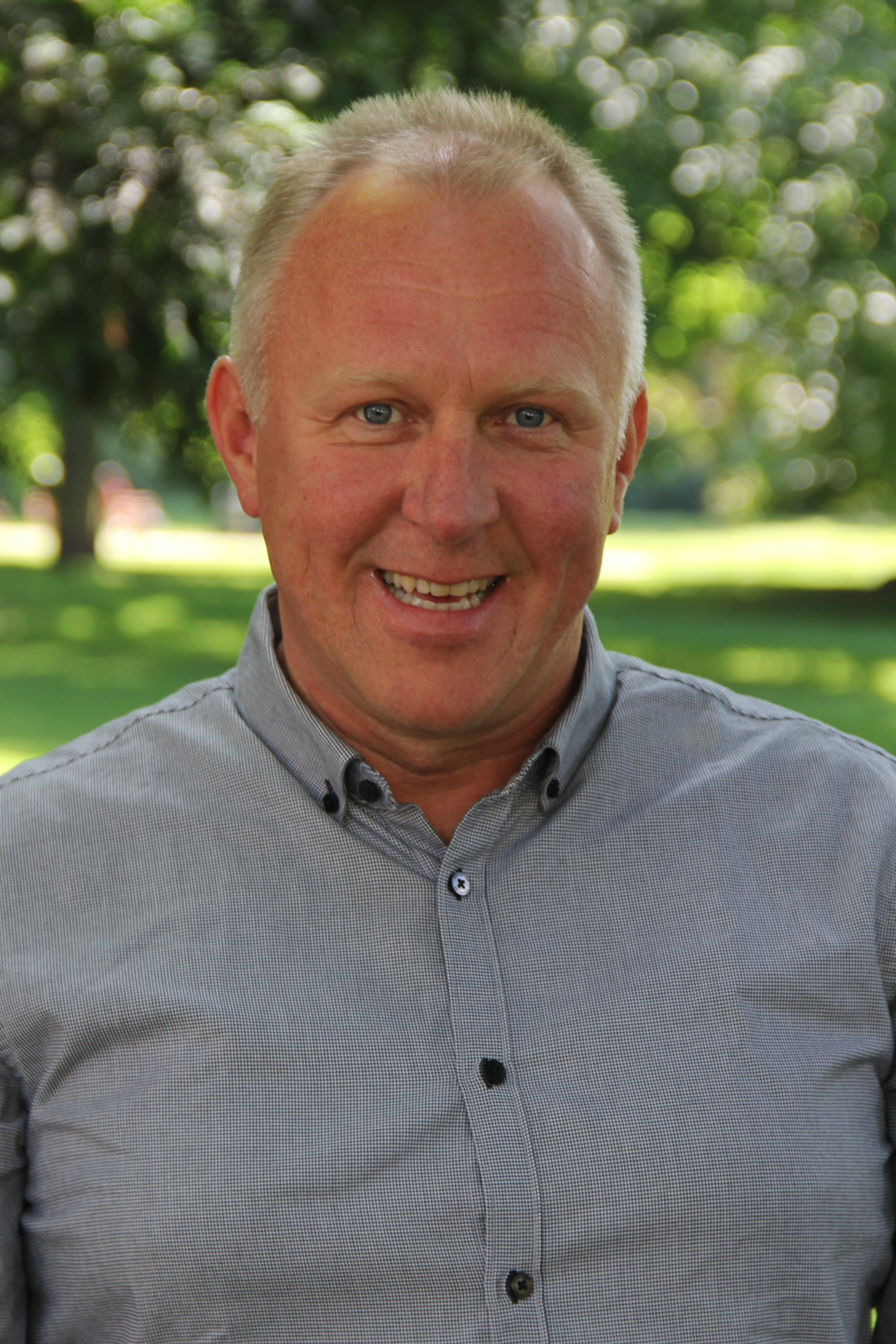
- Dehm in 2012
- Born: 1962 (age 62–63); Freigericht
- Education: University of Würzburg
- Occupations: Theologian; Gestalt therapist; Music publisher
- Organizations: Diocese of Limburg; Dehm Verlag; Eugen-Dehm-Stiftung; inTAKT

Patrick Dehm (born 1962) is a German Catholic theologian, supervisor and clinical Gestalt therapist. He and his brother founded the Eugen Dehm foundation, supporting a holistic health concept, in memory of their father.

Dehm is the director of the Dehm Verlag publishing music of the genre Neues Geistliches Lied (NGL), and president of the ecumenical association inTAKT for the support of NGL, which he initiated.

== Career ==
Born in Freigericht, Dehm studied Catholic theology at the University of Würzburg, and was trained to be a Personalentwickler (Human resource manager) and Gestalt therapist.

He worked for the Diocese of Fulda as Jugendreferent für kirchliche kommunale Jugendarbeit in Freigericht. He moved to the Diocese of Limburg in 1989, where he worked for 11 years as a member of the leading team for the ministry to young people. From 1996, he was president of the Arbeitskreis Kirchenmusik und Jugendseelsorge im Bistum Limburg. He published several song books with modern sacred songs (Neues Geistliches Lied), such as in 2011 a collection of 720 songs titled Ein Segen sein – Junges Gotteslob, and supported bands and youth choirs. From 2001, Dehm was director of the Haus der Begegnung (House of Meeting) in Frankfurt where he encouraged hospitality and openness, and a meeting of therapy, education and culture. He was suspended on 29 June 2012, allegedly because of a hostile remark about Bishop Franz-Peter Tebartz-van Elst, which caused protests from within the Church.

Dehm and Eugen Eckert, who expressed his solidarity with Dehm by stepping back from his posts in the diocese, responded by announcing the founding of an ecumenical association inTAKT for the support of Neues Geistliches Lied. On 8 April 2013 it was founded, with Dehm as president, Eckert as vice president, and Annette Kreuzer and Thomas Gabriel on the board, among others.

== Foundation ==
Together with his mother and his brother, Dehm founded the Eugen-Dehm-Stiftung (Eugen Dehm foundation) in 2008, after the death of his father Eugen Dehm, supporting a holistic health concept. The Eugen-Dehm-Stiftung was acknowledged on 11 November 2008 as a Stiftung des bürgerlichen Rechts.

== Dehm Verlag ==
Dehm has been the director of the Dehm Verlag from 2008, publishing mostly compositions, songbooks, choral books and oratorios of the genre Neues Geistliches Lied.

== Publications ==
- 2003: Lass dein Licht leuchten, choral book with 103 songs for Advent and Christmas
- 2006: NachKlänge, 69 songs (40 new songs), 15 proposals for evening prayers in parishes, youth groups and school
- 2007: Der Umgang mit dem urheberrecht – Was ist erlaubt uns was nicht?
- 2008: Weil du da bist – Kinder Gotteslob, collection of 380 new and known songs
- 2009: Weil der Himmel uns braucht, choral book, collection of 204 songs
- 2010: Lichter auf dem Weg, Messe mit Neuen geistlichen Liedern for three- to four-part mixed choir, text: Helmut Schlegel, music: Winfried Heurich
- 2011: Irische Messe: Die Saat geht auf, text: Alexander Bayer, music: Liam Lawton
- 2011: Wie Feuer in der Nacht – Eine Messe mit Neuen Geistlichen Liedern, text: Eugen Eckert, music: Ralph Grössler
- 2011: Ragtime-Mass. Lateinisches Messordinarium for solo, mixed choir, strings and Dixieland combo, music: Johann Simon Kreuzpointner
- 2011: Ein Segen sein – Junges Gotteslob, 720 songs
- 2011: Begegnen und Versöhnen, songs for up to four-part mixed choir and piano, music: Winfried Heurich
- 2012: Soul Messe, music: Kai Lünnemann
- 2012: Moderne geistliche Literatur für Männerchöre, for men's choir
- 2012: Sende uns Engel, in sign language and sheet music
- 2013: Von David, Saul & Goliath. – Kindermusical, children's musical, text: Eugen Eckert, musik: Horst Christill
- 2013: Die Träume hüten, Chorbuch, choral book of 169 songs
- 2016: Schlegel, Helmut. Laudato si' / Ein franziskanisches Magnificat. ISBN 978-3-943302-34-9.
