= Neues Geistliches Lied =

Contemporary genre of German music intended for use in churches

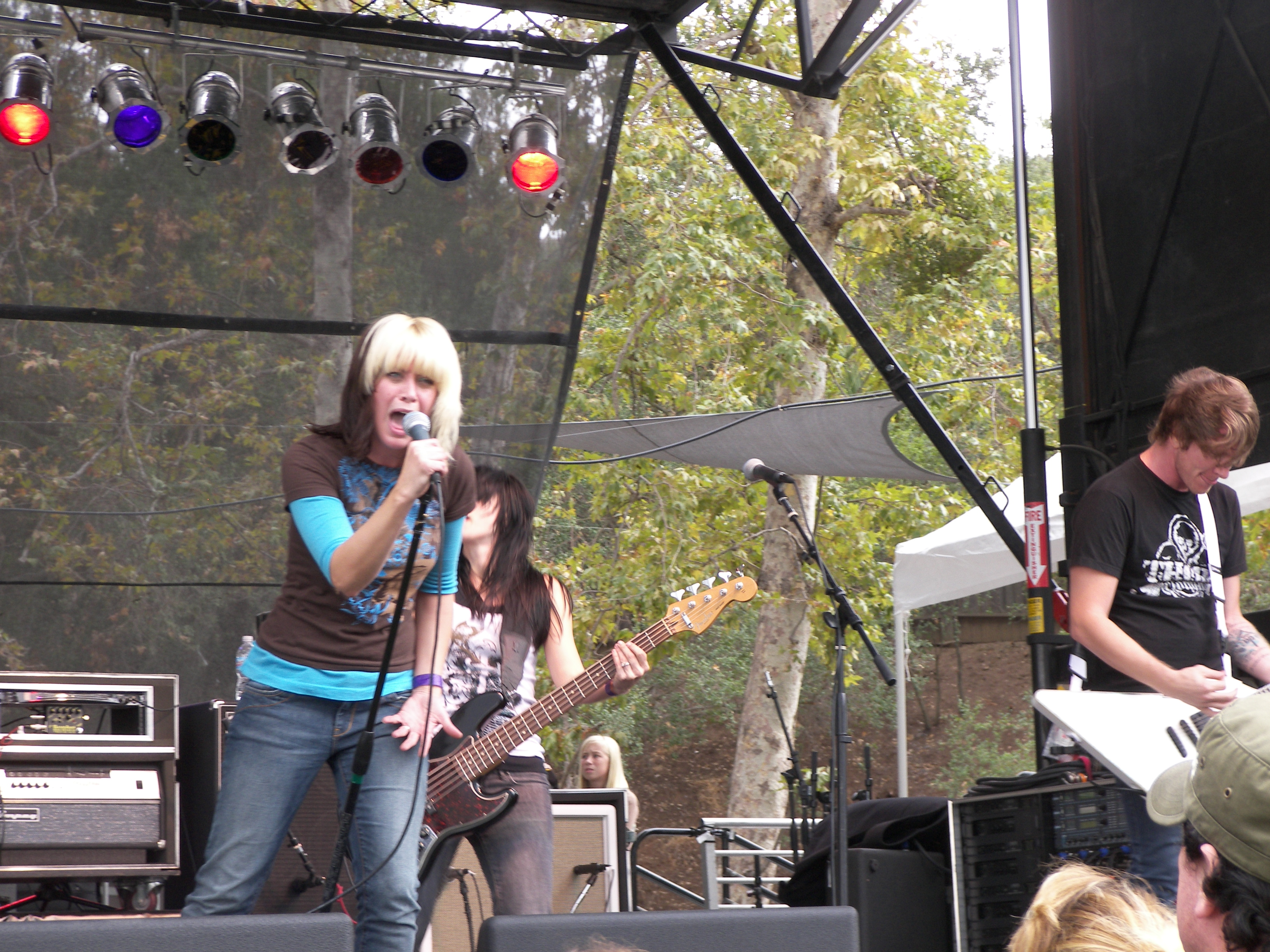
- Singer and band, a typical group performing contemporary sacred songs
- Genre: Song; musical
- Composed: 1961–present

Neues Geistliches Lied (German: [ˈnɔʏəs ˈɡaɪstlɪçəs ˈliːt], lit. new spiritual song), abbreviated NGL, is a music genre of songs in German intended for church usage, and based on contemporary lyrics and with music by contemporary composers.

== History ==
The idea to reach young people by new songs for church services began in the 1950s. The first song in the genre was in 1955 Seigneur, mon ami by Père Duval who performed his religious chansons at the Protestant church assembly Kirchentag in 1962. Christians looked for an expression for reformation of thoughts and liturgy in the churches. The Protestant Evangelische Akademie Tutzing organised competitions, initiated by the minister for students (Studentenpfarrer) in Munich, Günther Hegele. The first competition in 1962 received 996 entries, the first prize went to "Danke" with text and music by Martin Gotthard Schneider. "Stern über Bethlehem" was written by Alfred Hans Zoller for the third competition in 1964, and became a common song of the star singers. Musicals by Andrew Lloyd Webber, in 1968 Joseph and the Amazing Technicolor Dreamcoat and in 1970 Jesus Christ Superstar, nourished tendencies to write more new music for young people.

In 1972, Peter Janssens introduced the term Sacropop to Germany, for a fusion of sacred texts and musical styles derived from pop and rock. A 2001 study, presented at the Überdiözesane Fachtagung Neues Geistliches Lied reported more than 1895 choirs and bands active in the field of NGL. The songs became an established medium in services. Christoph Kießig of a Berlin band noted: "Das NGL ist eine der wenigen Stellen, an denen Jugendliche und Erwachsene nicht nur konsumieren." (The NGL is one of the few fields where adults and young people don't only consume.) René Frank wrote in 2003 that only songs that congregations like to sing in services are truly NGL ("Denn nur was sich bewährt, bleibt in den Gemeinden lebendig und wird als Neues Geistliches Lied praktiziert."). New elements compared to traditional hymns are rhythms with syncopes and stresses on the offbeat, contemporary lyrics, and melodies that can be easily learned.

=== Songbooks ===
Collections of NGL were for example in 1970 Jericho, edited by Karl Natiesta and Tom Runggaldier, and a year later in Schalom – Ökumenisches Liederbuch (Schalom – Ecumenical songbook).

Josef Mittermair published in 1979 the collection Das Lob (Praise), which tried to represent the bandwidth of spirituals with German texts, chansons by Maurice Cocagnac, Duval, Alfred Flury and Sœur Sourire, the Gen Rosso mass, the Tiroler Jugend- und Kindermessen by Raimund Kreidl, and the mass for children Pfälzer Kindermesse by Hartmut Wortmann. A 14th edition of this song book appeared in 2013.

Other song books have included

- 1986: Singe Jerusalem
- 1994: Cantate I, 2007: Cantate II
- 2002: Liederquelle
- 2006: du mit uns
- 2008: Kindergotteslob – Weil du da bist
- 2011: Junges Gotteslob – Ein Segen sein

Several NGL were included in the Protestant hymnal Evangelisches Gesangbuch in 1996, including songs by Clemens Bittlinger, Oskar Gottlieb Blarr, Siegfried Fietz, Kurt Rommel, Martin Gotthard Schneider, Manfred Siebald, Peter Strauch, Dieter Trautwein, Jürgen Werth and Christoph Zehendner. The second version of the Catholic hymnal Gotteslob has included NGL in its main section from 2013.

=== Initiative in Limburg ===
The Catholic Diocese of Limburg established in 1971 a work group for church music and youth (Arbeitskreis Kirchenmusik und Jugendseelsorge im Bistum Limburg). It established means of publication to familiarise congregations and musicians with new songs. Members have included Horst Christill, Patrick Dehm, Eugen Eckert, Dietmar Fischenich, Winfried Heurich, Joachim Raabe and Peter Reulein. A new group has been dedicated especially to NGL.

The group initiated more than books for choir books and song books, including:

- 1994 Vom Leben singen, choir book, 188 songs
- 1999 die Zeit färben, choir and band book, 161 songs
- 2003 Lass dein Licht leuchten, choir book, 103 songs
- 2008 Weil du da bist – Kinder-Gotteslob, song book, 380 songs
- 2009 Weil der Himmel uns braucht, choir and band book, 200 songs
- 2011 Junges Gotteslob – Ein Segen sein, song book, 720 songs

== Literature ==
- Peter Hahnen: Das Neue Geistliche Lied als zeitgenössische Komponente christlicher Spiritualität. 2nd ed, LIT-Verlag, Münster 2003, ISBN 3-8258-3679-7.
- Peter Hahnen: Liederzünden! Theologie und Geschichte des Neuen Geistlichen Liedes. Lahn-Verlag/Haus Altenberg, Kevelaer/Düsseldorf 2009, ISBN 978-3-7840-3433-1.
- Dorothea Monninger (ed.): Neue Geistliche Lieder. Töne – Texte – Temperamente. Arbeitsstelle Gottesdienst der EKD, Informations- und Korrespondenzblatt, 16th year, issue 2 (2002).
- Peter Deckert: Literatur zum Neuen Geistlichen Lied. Bücher, Zeitschriftenartikel, collected references from theses related to "Neues Geistliches Lied (NGL) – Sacro-Pop – Religiöse Popularmusik". Köln 1975–2016.
- Bernward Hofmann (collection): Troubadour für Gott – Neue Geistliche Lieder. 6. Auflage. Kolping-Bildungswerk Diözesanverband Würzburg e.V., Würzburg 1999.
- Peter Bubmann: Das "Neue Geistliche Lied" als Ausdrucksmedium religiöser Milieus. In: Zeithistorische Forschungen/Studies in Contemporary History 7 (2010), pp 460–468.
