= Gerhard Pieschl =

German Roman Catholic prelate (born 1934)

The Most Reverend Gerhard Pieschl
- Auxiliary Bishop Emeritus of Limburg
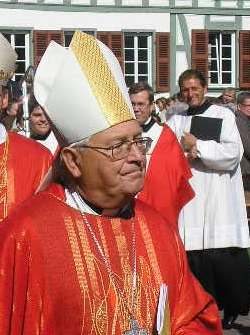
- Diocese: Limburg
- Appointed: 24 August 1977
- Term ended: 15 June 2009
- Other post: Titular Bishop of Misenum

Orders
- Ordination: 8 December 1961
- Consecration: 23 October 1977 by Wilhelm Kempf

Personal details
- Born: 23 January 1934 (age 92) Moravská Třebová, Czechoslovakia
- Denomination: Catholic Church
- Motto: Non recuso laborem
- Coat of arms

Gerhard Pieschl (born 23 January 1934) is a German Roman Catholic prelate, who served as an Auxiliary Bishop of the Diocese of Limburg from 1977 until his retirement in 2009.

== Early life and education ==
Pieschl was born in Moravská Třebová in Czechoslovakia. Following the expulsion of Germans from Czechoslovakia after World War II, his family settled in Hesse, Germany. He was ordained a priest for the Diocese of Limburg on 8 December 1961.

== Episcopal ministry ==
On 24 August 1977, Pope Paul VI appointed Pieschl as Auxiliary Bishop of Limburg and Titular Bishop of Misenum. He received his episcopal consecration on 23 October 1977 from Bishop Wilhelm Kempf, with Bishop Walther Kampe and Bishop Joseph Maria Reuss serving as co-consecrators.

During his tenure, Pieschl was known for his advocacy for displaced persons and ethnic German refugees (Heimatvertriebene). He served as the commissioner for the German Bishops' Conference for the pastoral care of displaced persons and as the national praeses of the Sudetendeutsche Landsmannschaft.

On 15 June 2009, Pope Benedict XVI accepted his resignation from the office of auxiliary bishop upon reaching the age limit of 75. He continues to reside in Limburg as a bishop emeritus.
