= Bätzing =

Bätzing is a German surname. Notable people with the surname include:

- Georg Bätzing (born 1961), German Roman Catholic bishop
- Sabine Bätzing-Lichtenthäler (born 1975), German politician
