= Wolfgang Rösch =

German Roman Catholic priest

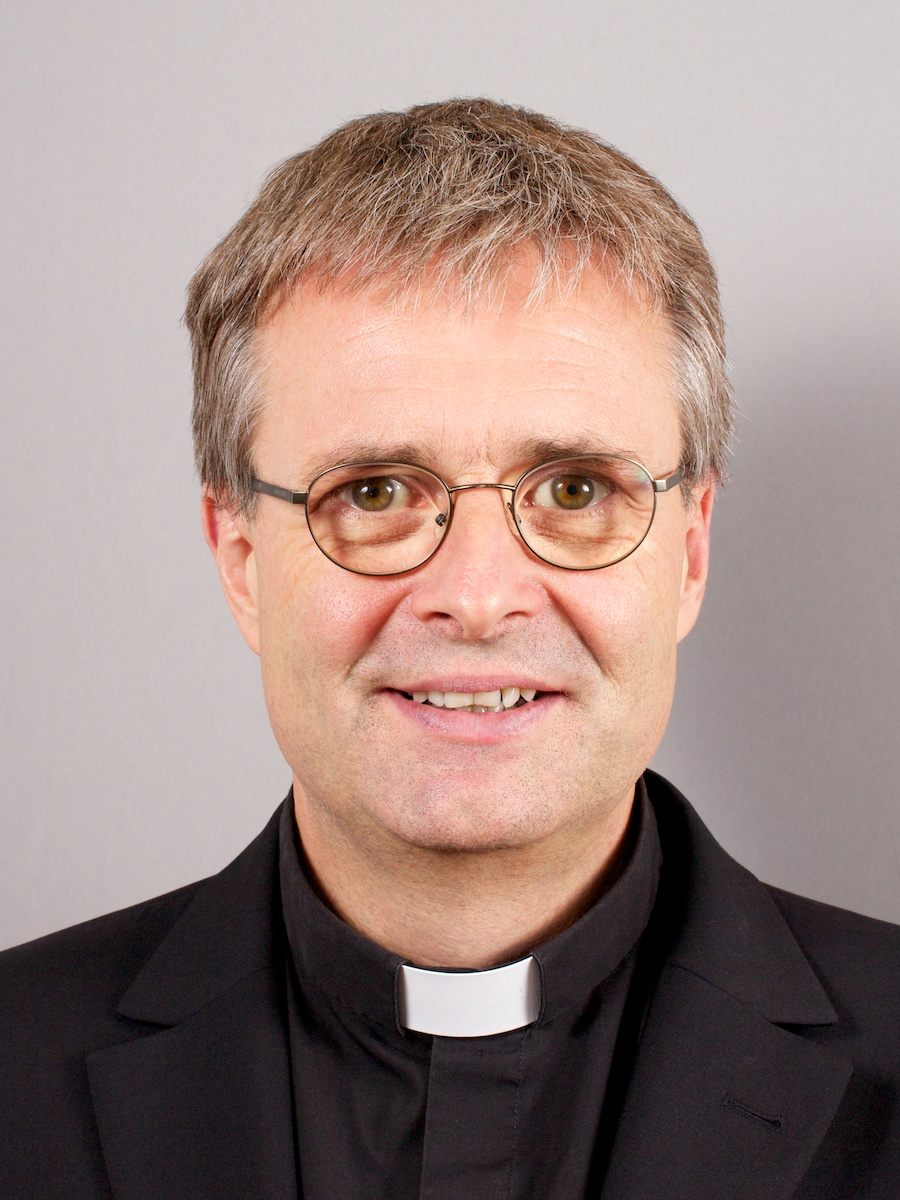
- Portrait, 2012
- Born: 25 August 1959 (age 67); Wiesbaden, Germany
- Education: Technische Universität Darmstadt; Hochschule Sankt Georgen; Pontifical Gregorian University
- Occupation: Catholic priest
- Years active: 2010–2013 St. Bonifatius, Wiesbaden; from 2013 Vicar general of Limburg

Wolfgang Rösch (born 25 August 1959) is a German Catholic priest. He was from 2010 to 2013 Dean of Wiesbaden at the parish St. Bonifatius. From 23 October 2013 he has been vicar general of the Diocese of Limburg, also administering the diocese during the absence of the bishop.

== Career ==
Born in Wiesbaden, Rösch grew up in Erbach, Rheingau as one of four brothers. He first studied mechanical engineering for five years at the Technische Universität Darmstadt. A month after completing his studies he began to study philosophy and theology at the Philosophisch-Theologische Hochschule Sankt Georgen in Frankfurt, later at the Pontifical Gregorian University in Rome. He was ordained as a priest in Rome in 1990 by Karl Lehmann.

His first positions were as Kaplan (assisting minister) in Wetzlar and Hadamar. He led the office Diözesanstelle Berufe der Kirche of the Diocese of Limburg. In 1997 he succeeded Thomas Löhr as Regens (director) of the Priesterseminar Limburg (seminary for candidates for the priesthood). In 2003 bishop Franz Kamphaus made him minister of the parishes of Königstein and Kronberg.

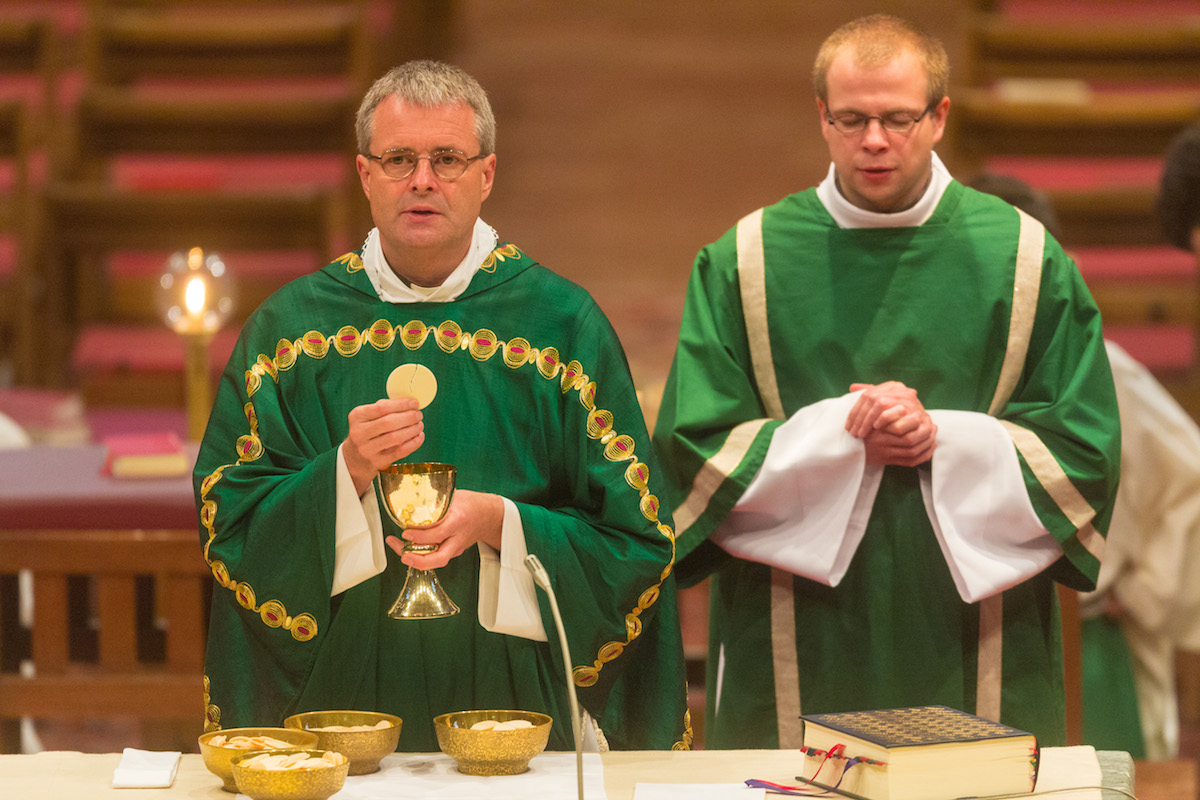
Rösch (left) celebrating mass in St. Bonifatius on 27 October 2013

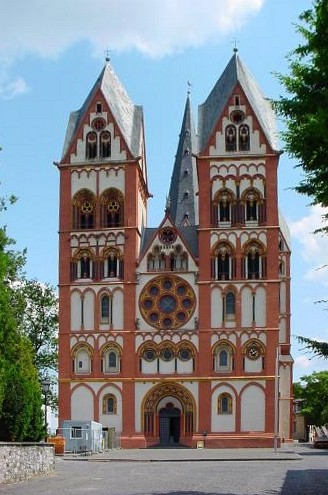
Limburg Cathedral

From 2010 to 2013, Rösch was Catholic dean of the city of Wiesbaden and minister of St. Bonifatius, He managed in 2012 the union of eight parishes to a larger parish (Pastoraler Raum, literally: pastoral space). He was also at the same time president of the Wiesbaden chapter of Caritas.

He succeeded Franz Kaspar as general vicar of Limburg from 23 October 2013, not only assisting the bishop Franz-Peter Tebartz-van Elst as originally planned but leading the diocese while the bishop is suspended by the Vatican. Vatican Radio published: "Vicar General Rösch will administer the diocese of Limburg during the absence of the diocesan bishop, within the sphere of competence associated with this office". At a press conference in Limburg, he spoke about plans for personal meetings to re-establish trust, admitting that it is difficult. ("Es ist immer schwer, verlorenes Vertrauen zurückzugewinnen.") He stated that whatever the investigation commission will reveal, there will be no winner. ("Egal wie es ausgeht, es wird keinen Sieger geben.") He described himself as "eher ein Mann der zweiten Reihe, ein Mann, der den direkten Kontakt suche, ein Mann der Demut" (rather a man in the second row, a man who seeks direct contact, a man of humility").

A farewell service was held in Wiesbaden on 12 January 2014, attended by 1,200 people. Rösch invited participants not to concentrate on what is missing but rely on creative energy ("kreative Kraft") and hope.
