= Holy Cross – Centre for Christian Meditation and Spirituality =

Roman Catholic institution in Germany, 2007–2025

Coordinates: 50°07′37″N 08°43′06″E

Heilig Kreuz – Zentrum für christliche Meditation und Spiritualität Holy Cross – Centre for Christian Meditation and Spirituality
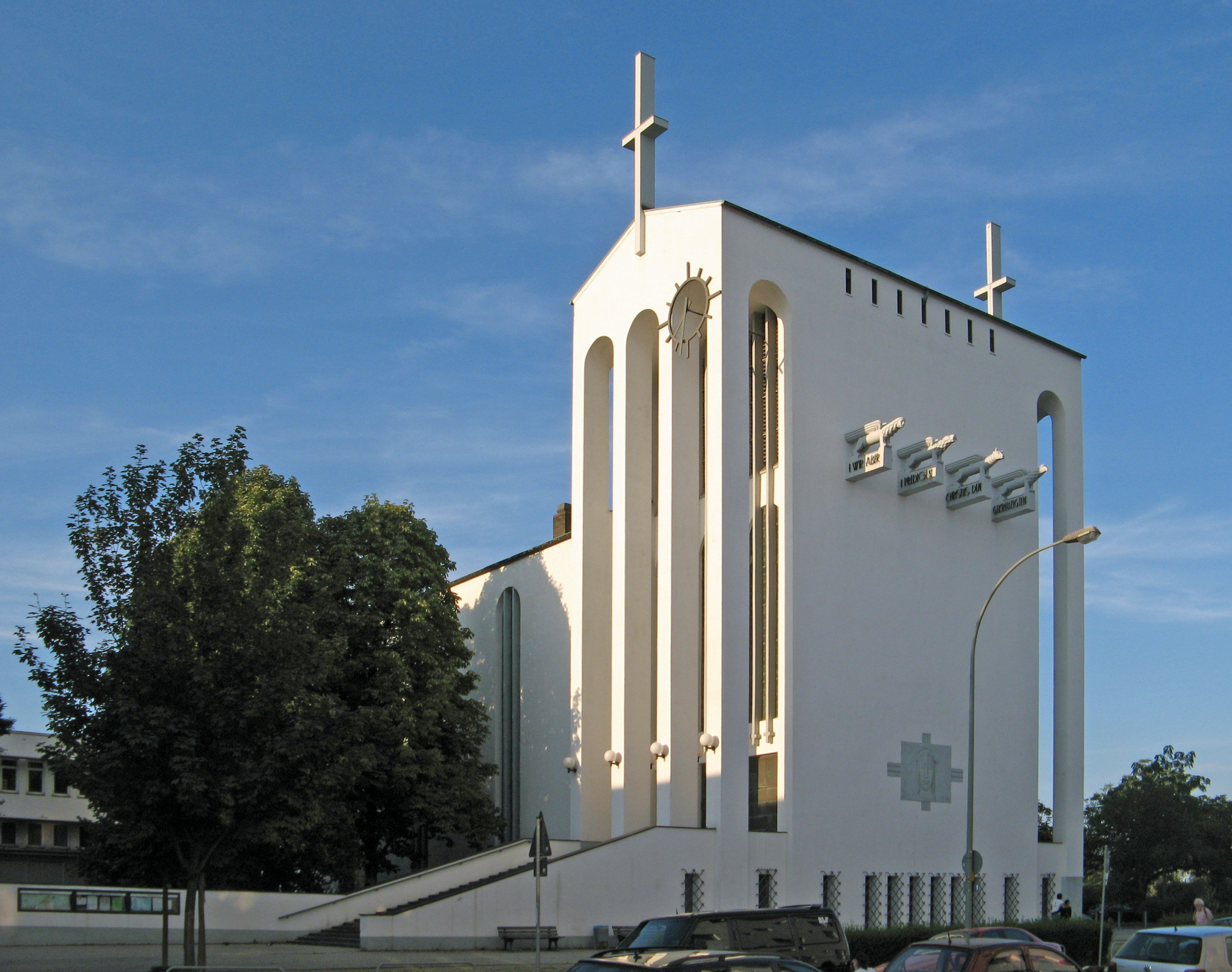
- Heilig Kreuz – Zentrum für christliche Meditation und Spiritualität; Holy Cross – Centre for Christian Meditation and Spirituality
- Location: Bornheim, Frankfurt, Hesse
- Country: Germany
- Language: German
- Denomination: Catholic
- Website: https://meditationszentrum.bistumlimburg.de/

History
- Status: Meditation church
- Founded: 1 July 2007
- Founder: Franz Kamphaus

Architecture
- Closed: 20 December 2025

Administration
- Diocese: Diocese of Limburg

Clergy
- Priest: Olaf Lindenberg (until 2025)

The Holy Cross – Centre for Christian Meditation and Spirituality (German: Heilig Kreuz – Zentrum für christliche Meditation und Spiritualität) was an institution of the Diocese of Limburg, Germany founded in 2007. It was based at the Holy Cross Church in Bornheim, Frankfurt and was dedicated to services, contemplation, meditation, retreats, counseling and other events such as concerts.

At the end of August 2025, the closure of the centre was announced for the end of 2025 with a celebration on 20 December 2025. In addition, the establishment of the Spirituality Centre as a successor organisation was announced. As the future use of the church had not yet been decided at the end of December 2025, some events remain scheduled for January 2026 in rooms such as the crypt.

== History ==
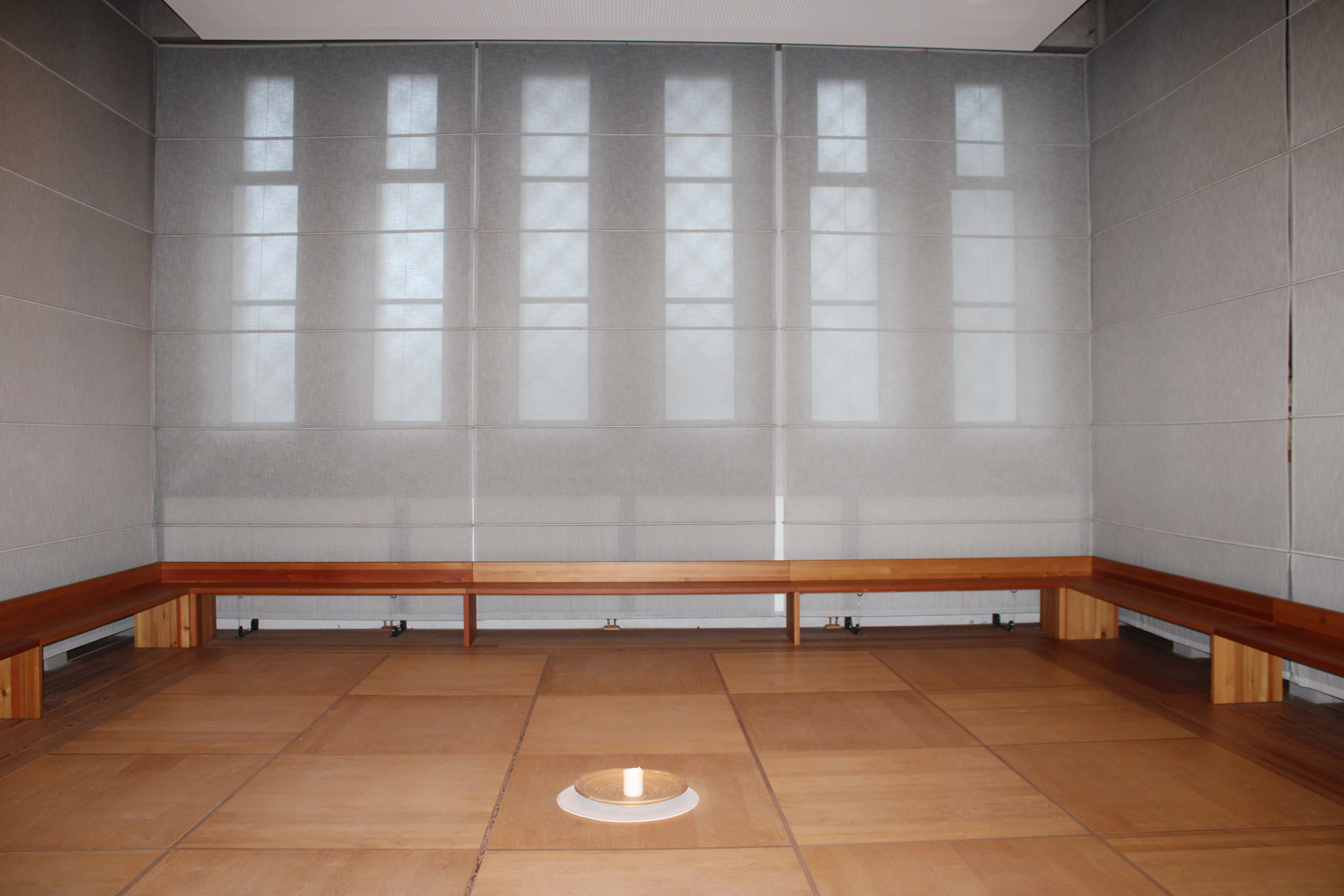
Meditation area in the crypt of the church

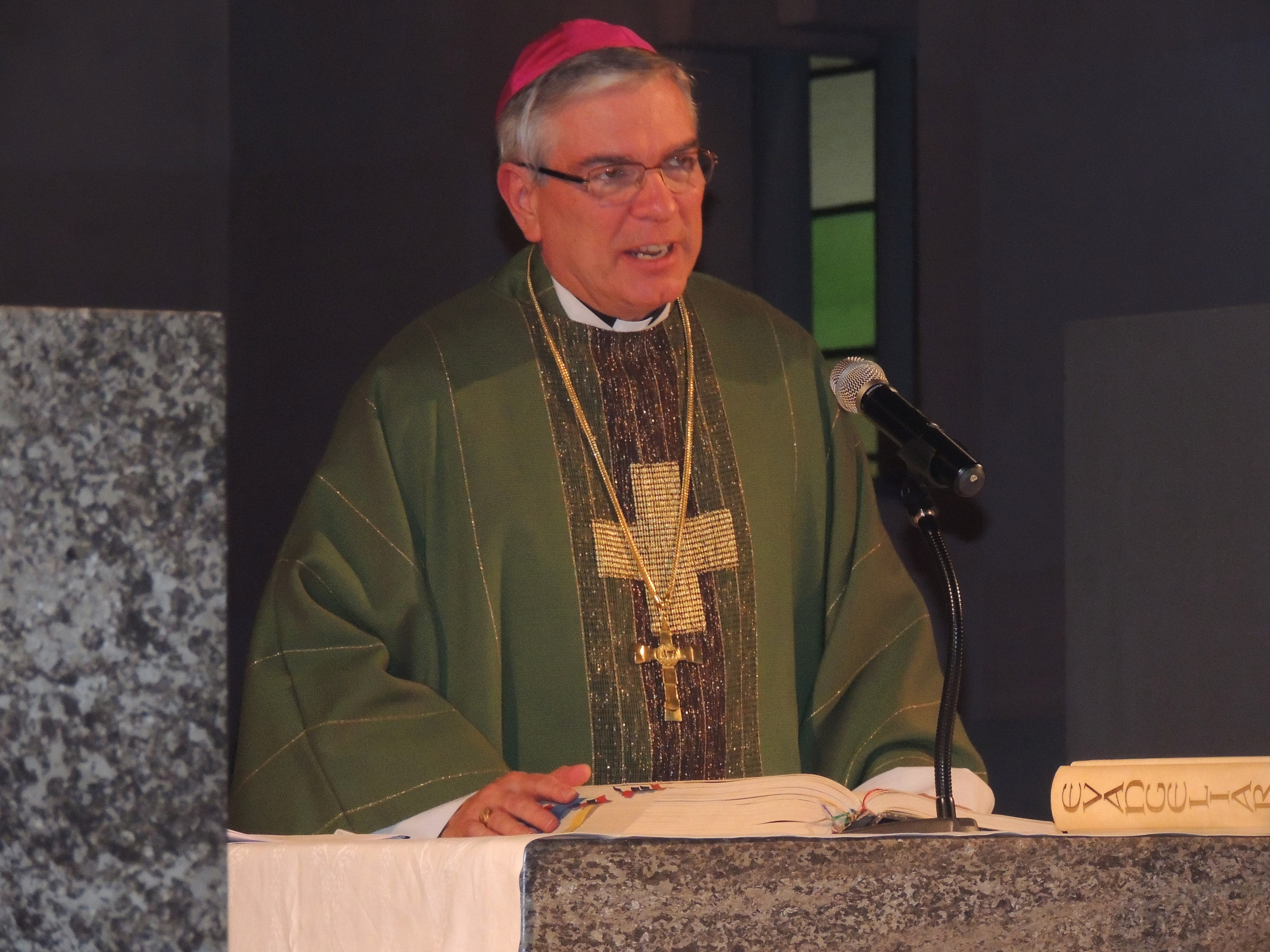
Auxiliary bishop Thomas Löhr during the fifth anniversary of the centre in 2012

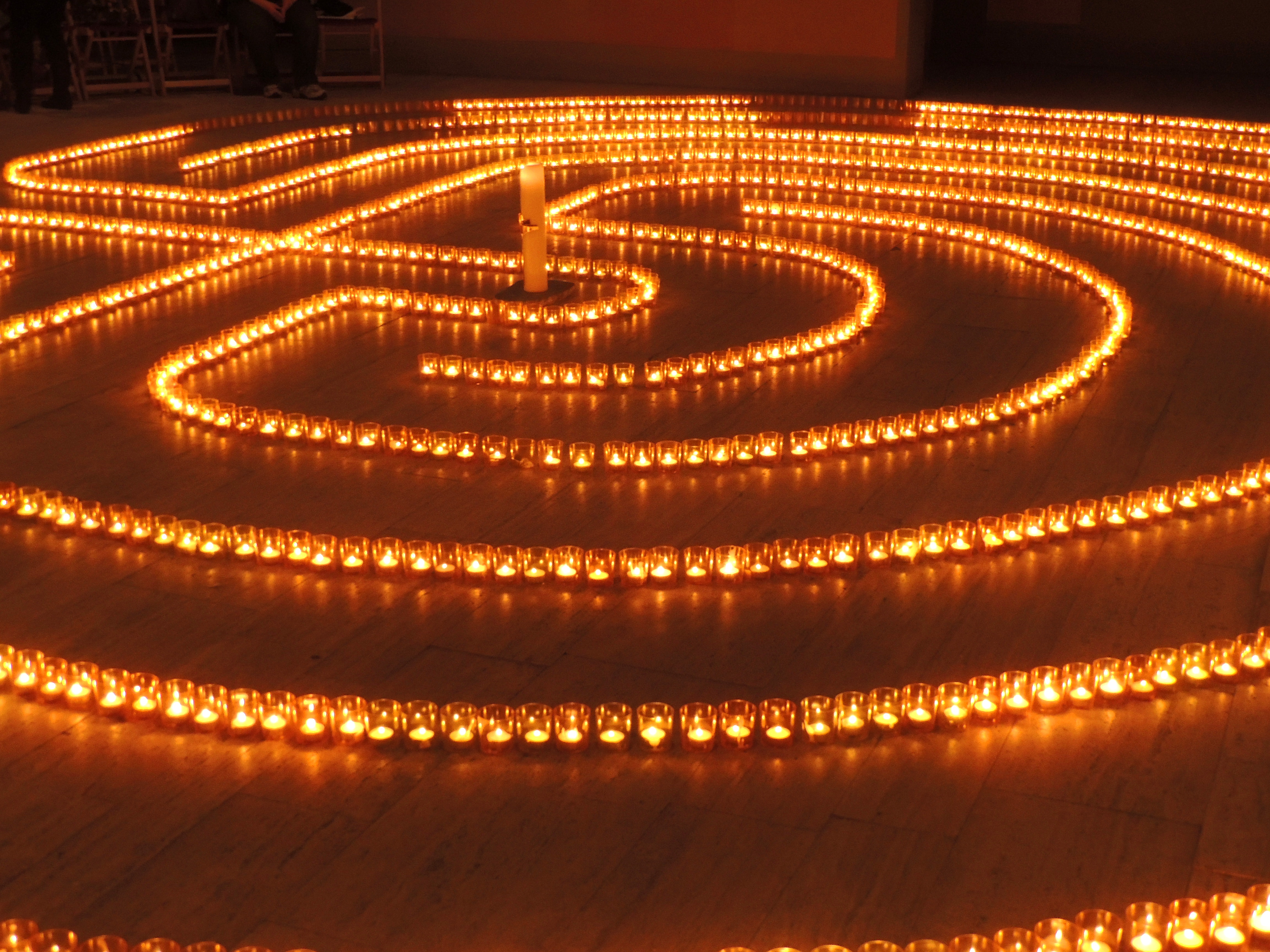
Cretan style advent-labyrinth consists of 2,500 burning tealights inside the church in 2012

Creation and use of the Advent labyrinth in 2013

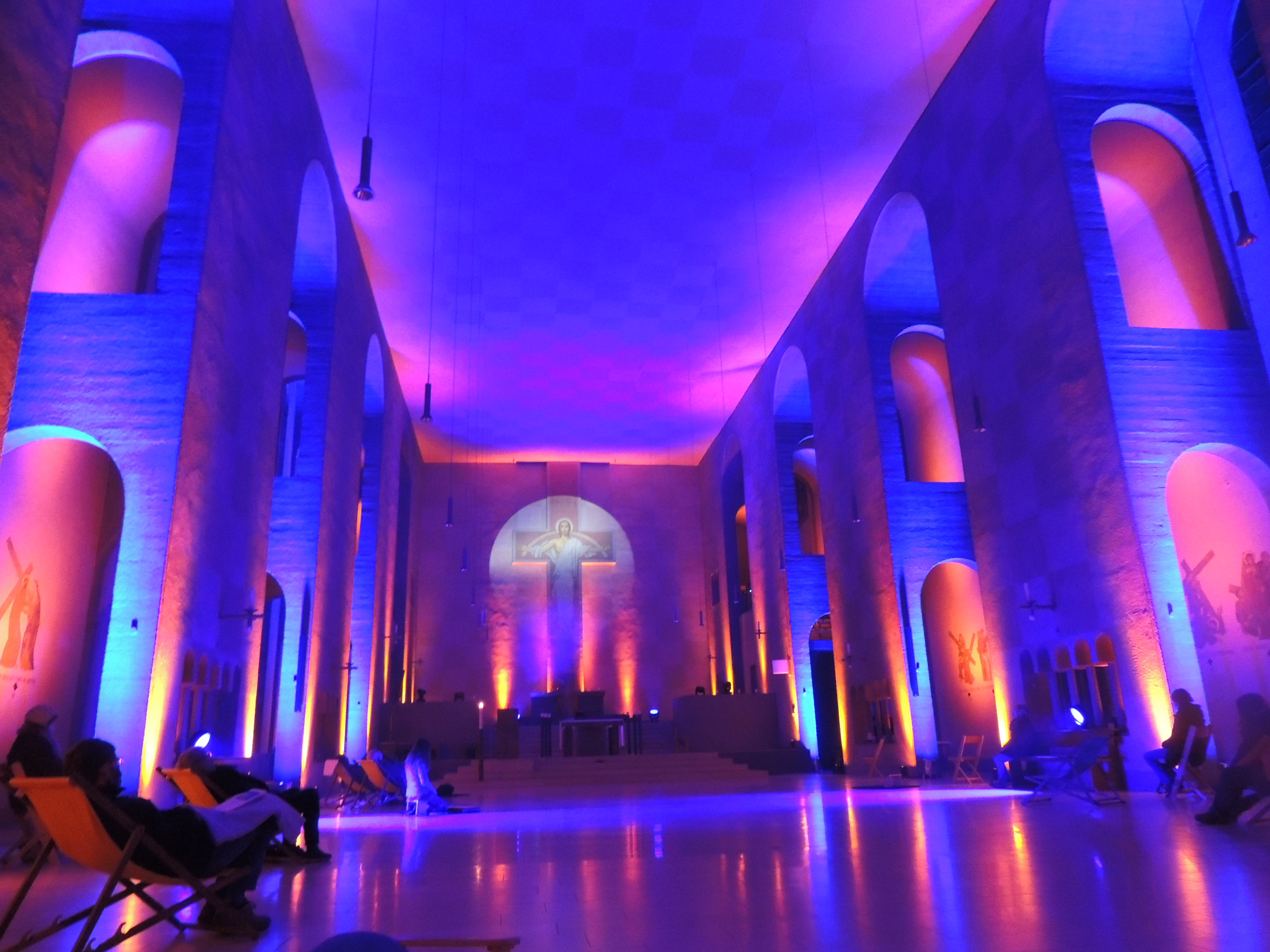
Part of the lightshow at the first weekend in advent 2020 inside the church

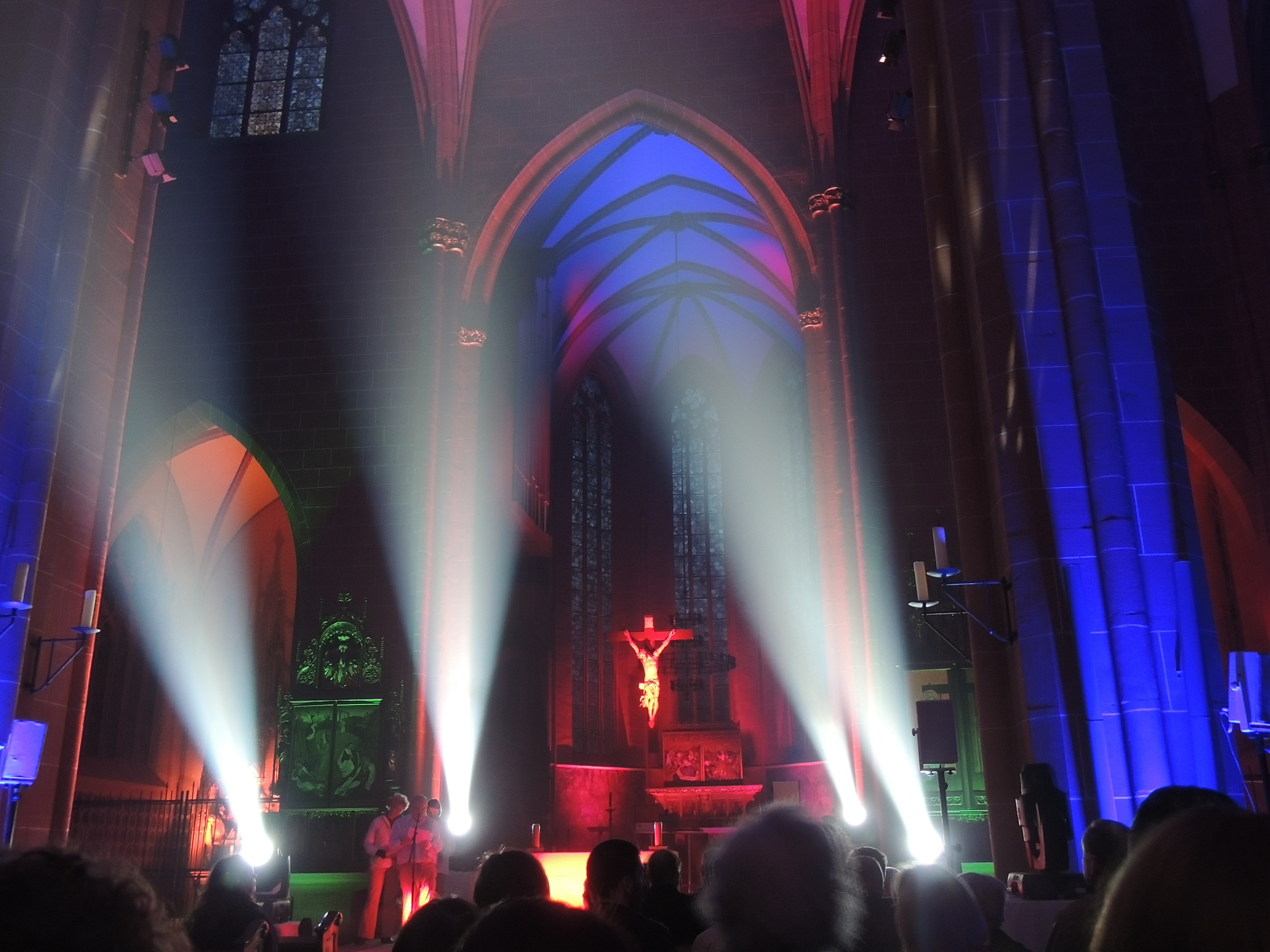
Compositions of light, words, and music during the Luminale festival in Frankfurt Cathedral in collaboration with the Youth Church JONA in 2014

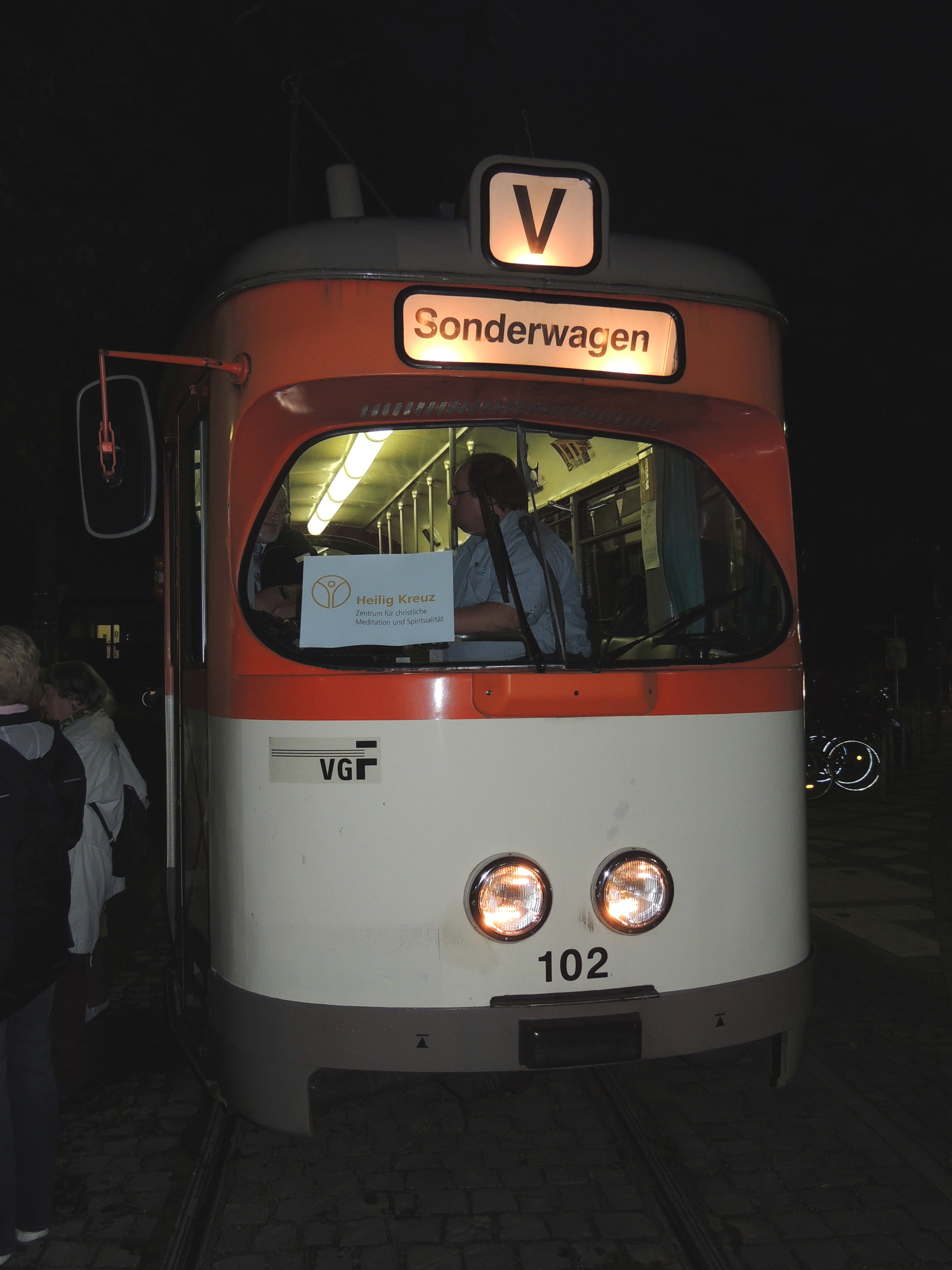
"Tram of Silence" with M-type railcar 102 in 2013

When Franz Kamphaus, then bishop of Limburg, visited the parishes of Frankfurt in 2004, he met people who were open to spiritual experiences but not within the traditional churches. He founded the centre in 2007. On 15 January he signed the charter of foundation for the theme church Holy Cross – Centre for Christian Meditation and Spirituality in Frankfurt-Bornheim. The charter of foundation came into effect on 1 July 2007.

The Holy Cross Church accommodated one of five profile churches of the Diocese of Limburg. The others were the Centre for Mourning Counselling in St. Michael in Frankfurt-Nordend and the three youth churches: Crossover in St. Hildegard in Limburg an der Lahn, Jona in St. Bonifatius in Frankfurt-Sachsenhausen, and Kana in Maria-Hilf in Wiesbaden-Nordost. Like the church St. Michael, the Holy Cross Church was from 2007 to 2015 a branch church of the parish St. Josef Frankfurt. The centre is a pastoral institution of the diocese under the responsibility of the Pastoral Care and Education Division, Pastoral Care and Development Department (as of 9/2025). It was directed from 2007 until July 2018 by the Franciscan Helmut Schlegel OFM, where he worked until June 2019 as a retreat and meditation leader and priestly co-worker. Since November 2018 the centre was directed by the theologist Samuel Stricker. In August 2019 Olaf Lindenberg took over the role as priestly co-worker. The team previously included other course instructors, including representatives from the Medical Mission Sisters. In May 2024, Sr. Kristina Wolf MMS took over as acting director until the centre closed, as Samuel Stricker moved to another position within the Diocese of Limburg. They work with a team of contributors, for example from the order of Medical Mission Sisters.

The centre was the first institution of its kind in Germany as a meditation church. The meditation centre celebrated its 5th anniversary in 2012 and its 10th anniversary in 2017.

In March 2020, the Center's program had to be suspended because all worship services in Germany and thus all other events had to be cancelled due to the COVID 19 pandemic in Germany. However, at certain times the church is open for meditation for a limited number of people. In May services were resumed on Saturdays under special conditions.

In December 2020, a Protestant vicar of the Protestant Church in Hesse and Nassau was employed for the first time in a six-month special vicariate in the center.

On 20 August 2025, it was announced that the meditation center of the Diocese of Limburg would be closing at the end of 2025 with a celebration on the Saturday before the fourth Sunday of Advent, 20 December 2025, after more than 18 years. The future use of the premises in Heilig Kreuz had not yet been decided at that time. This is determined jointly by the Diocese of Limburg; the parish of St. Josef Frankfurt, in whose parish territory the Holy Cross Church is located; and the Association of Catholic Parishes in Frankfurt. The last event held at the meditation center in Holy Cross Church after its official closure on 20 December 2025, was the Midnight Mass at Christmas Eve on 24 December 2025.

On 20 May 2025, a team from the diocese decided to establish a centre for spirituality in place of the meditation centre, whose location, venues and programme were not yet known at that time. The Missionary Medical Sisters continue to work in this facility. The opening of the Spirituality Centre was planned for March 2026 at the beginning of December 2025. The location in a central location in Frankfurt and the various decentralised and partly temporary venues have not yet been announced. Provided that future use of Holy Cross Church is compatible with specific offerings from the Spirituality Center, the Center may continue to use the church premises if necessary.

== Program ==
Although the offerings of the centre reflected the tenets of Christianity, the target audience included people of all religious denominations, worldviews, and cultures. The team normally published a new program annual. The centre offered different kinds of church services, such as expressionist dance, meditation courses, contemplative prayer, Zen-meditation courses, days of reflection, spiritual exercises, retreats, special events like for example lectures by guest speakers such as Anselm Grün, meditations with the Sōtō-Zen-priest and veteran of the Vietnam War Claude AnShin Thomas, external events like retreats on the North Sea island Wangerooge or sailing retreats and many other kinds of events. The Meditation Center also participated in the virtual Ecumenical Church Congress (Ökumenischer Kirchentag) in May 2021 in Frankfurt am Main. Since 2020, online offerings have supplemented the face-to-face events during the Corona period. In addition, the church was open every day from 5 to 7 p.m. for free meditation. Depending on staff availability, this offer was maintained until 2025.

Event series included days of exercises of Christian mysticism, meditative singing, meditative archery, seminars concerning the bible a male conversation group, spiritual guided city tours in which topics by Frankfurt tourist guides were joined with spiritual topics or pilgrim hikes with a picnic and devotions. One-time events were also part of the program, for example, the Tram of Silence tram rides on a historic railcar of the Frankfurt tramway system, including elements such as silence with short, thought-provoking impulses to the senses of seeing, hearing, feeling, and smelling.

The dialogue between the cultures and major religious groups concerning meditation and spirituality was another important aspect of the work of the centre. These included panel discussions with representatives of Buddhism, Hinduism, Islam, and Christianity about meditation, with personal field reports from the different religions. Other examples were courses in Qi Gong, Yoga and Yoga nidra, or dance performances of an Indian Jesuit padre who figures elements of traditional meditative dances such as Bharatanatyam from Hinduism as a kind of prayer to God.

For the last few years since 2011, a Cretan-style labyrinth consisting of between 2,000 and 2,500 tealights was formed on the third Saturday of Advent. This labyrinth was part of the respective evening service on Saturday evening and could be walked through by visitors. For the first time in Advent 2020, four theme weeks were held with a special light show, the Advent Labyrinth, the Peace Light and about light figures.

During the Frankfurt Luminale festival of light in 2014 the team members of the centre offered a meditation consisting of light, words, music, and sound in cooperation with the Jona youth church in the Frankfurt Cathedral.

Concert performances at the center have included for example A German Requiem by Johannes Brahms and meditative music from the Middle Ages by Hildegard of Bingen, Peter Abelard, and Rabanus Maurus.

In 2021, a pilgrimage guide was published for a 5.5 km city pilgrimage route with 11 stops in Innenstadt (Frankfurt's city centre) and Altstadt (old town) from the Liebfrauenkirche (Church of Our Lady) via Hauptwache (Main Guard), Börse (Stock Exchange), Willy-Brandt-Platz, Paulskirche (St Paul's Church), Römer (Roman), Kaiserdom St Bartholomäus (St Bartholomew's Cathedral), Jüdischer Friedhof Börneplatz at the Battonnstraße (Old Jewish Cemetery at Battonnstraße) and Börneplatz (Börne Square), Alter Brücke (Old Bridge), Eiserner Steg (Iron Footbridge) to the Church of St Leonhard.

In 2019, Father Olaf Lindenberg introduced a special form of evening service on Saturday evenings called the Freiraumgottesdienst (open space service). This included special spiritual elements such as a short meditation. This form was retained until Christmas Eve Mass on 24 December 2025. Due to the closure of the meditation centre, it was initially unclear how this series of services would continue. However, plans were made to continue it at another location.

In recent years, the Effata service of the Medical Mission Sisters was held on the first Wednesday of every month at Holy Cross Church. After the meditation centre closed, there were plans to continue the service at another church.

In addition, in collaboration with members of the Protestant Church, a special meditative service called ‘Gottesdienst aus der Stille’ (Service from Silence) has been offered four times a year at the Holy Cross Church since 2017. This service is to be continued at various locations in Frankfurt and the surrounding area from 2026 onwards.

== Interior ==
The interior of the church was modified for the new purpose, completed in 2010. The fixed pews were removed and replaced by folding chairs which enabled a more flexible use. While the former main altar was normally not used, a smaller wooden altar had been added, typically surrounded by circles of folding chairs. Stair lifts and wheelchair ramps were installed. The former crypt and the rooms of the former clergy house were transformed to be used for meditation. In the crypt, the floor was changed to wood, and the meditation area was enclosed by textile panels made from linen.

== Church building and parish ==
The Centre of Christian Meditation and Spirituality was located in the parish area of the Catholic parish St. Josef Frankfurt am Main, which was founded as a "parish of a new type" on 1 January 2015. In the new greater parish area there are four churches located as "church places" and two churches as "theme churches". One of the two theme churches was the Holy Cross Church, which headquarters the meditation centre and was used for church services of the centre and other centre events. The buildings are administrated by the Catholic Church of the city of Frankfurt am Main. There was an active collaboration with the parish of St. Josef Frankfurt am Main.

Since the beginning of the restoration of the interior of St. Leonhard in Frankfurt-Altstadt, the services of the local St. Leonhard's International English-Speaking Catholic Parish have been held in the Holy Cross Church since 7 May 2011. This remains the home of the Holy Cross Church even after the end of the work.

== Transport connections ==
The Holy-Cross-Church could easily be reached by walk in one minute from the tram stop Ernst-May-Platz of the tramline 14 of the Frankfurt tramway and the Stadtbahn station Eissporthalle/Festplatz of the line U7 of the Frankfurt light rail system (German: Frankfurt U-Bahn). Bus line 38 connects the sports centre (SCB) of the Turngemeinde Bornheim sports club and the Bornheimer Hang settlement with the district centre and the neighboring district of Seckbach. Also not far away is the motorway exit Frankfurt-Ost of the Federal Motorway 661 (German: Bundesautobahn 661).

== Camino de Santiago ==
Beneath the Bornheim slope to the east of the meditation centre runs a branch of the German Camino de Santiago (Way of St. James). The route is based on the ancient trade route from Leipzig to Frankfurt am Main (Des Reiches Straße). The way starts in the bishop city Fulda and continues through Schlüchtern, Steinau an der Straße, Bad Soden-Salmünster, Gelnhausen, Langenselbold, Erlensee, and Bruchköbel. It belongs to the network of main pilgrimage routes to the grave of St. James in the Cathedral of Santiago de Compostela. This branch, which is 116 km long, passes the Holy Cross Church and leads through the Ostpark, and then passes the Seat of the European Central Bank at the former Großmarkthalle (Wholesale Market Hall) on its route to the Main River and the inner city of Frankfurt am Main. It also passes the Eiserner Steg (an iron footbridge) and continues to Mainz and Trier.

== Gallery ==
Advent Labyrinth meditative

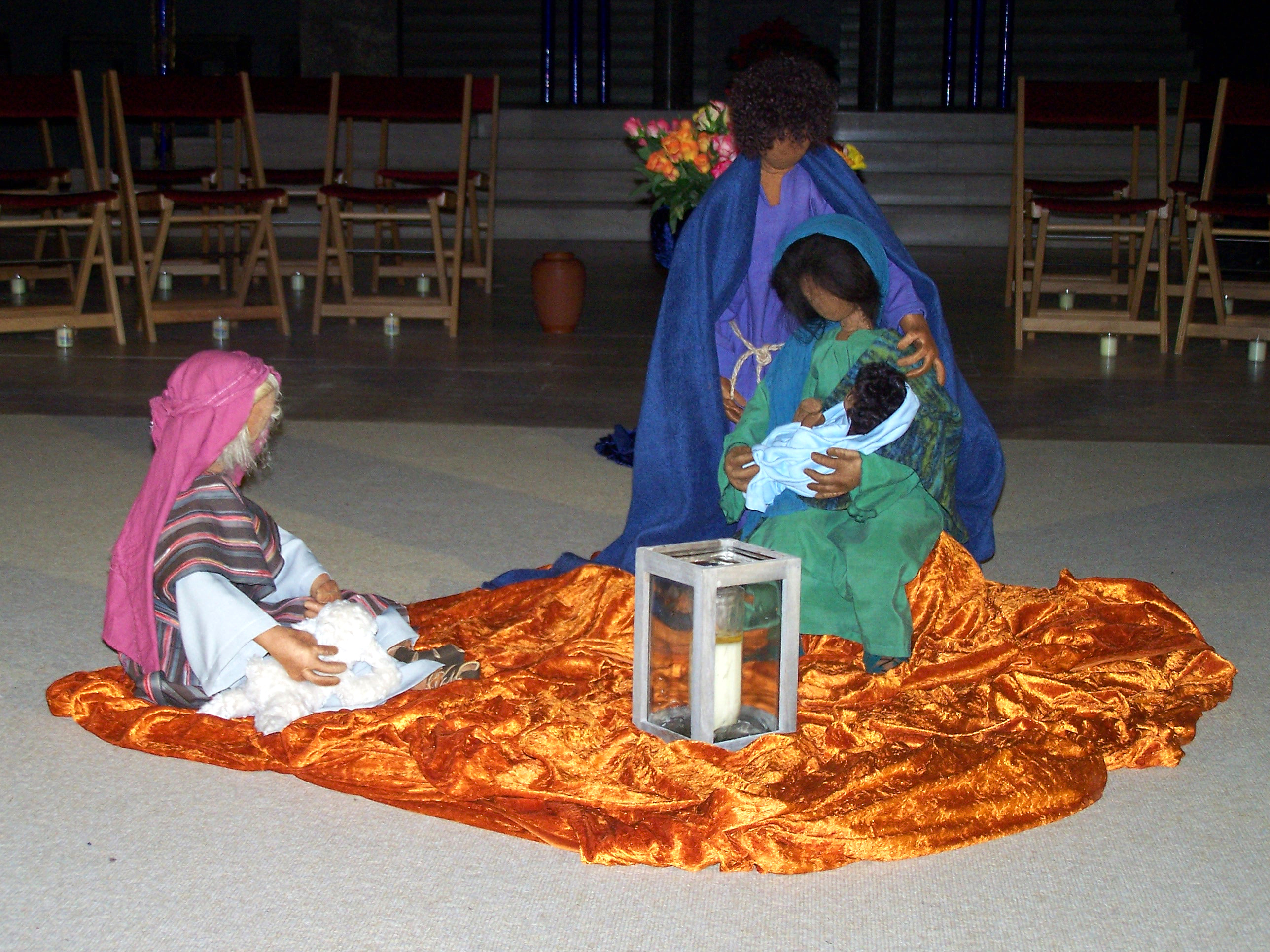
Nativity scene with Biblical narrative figures

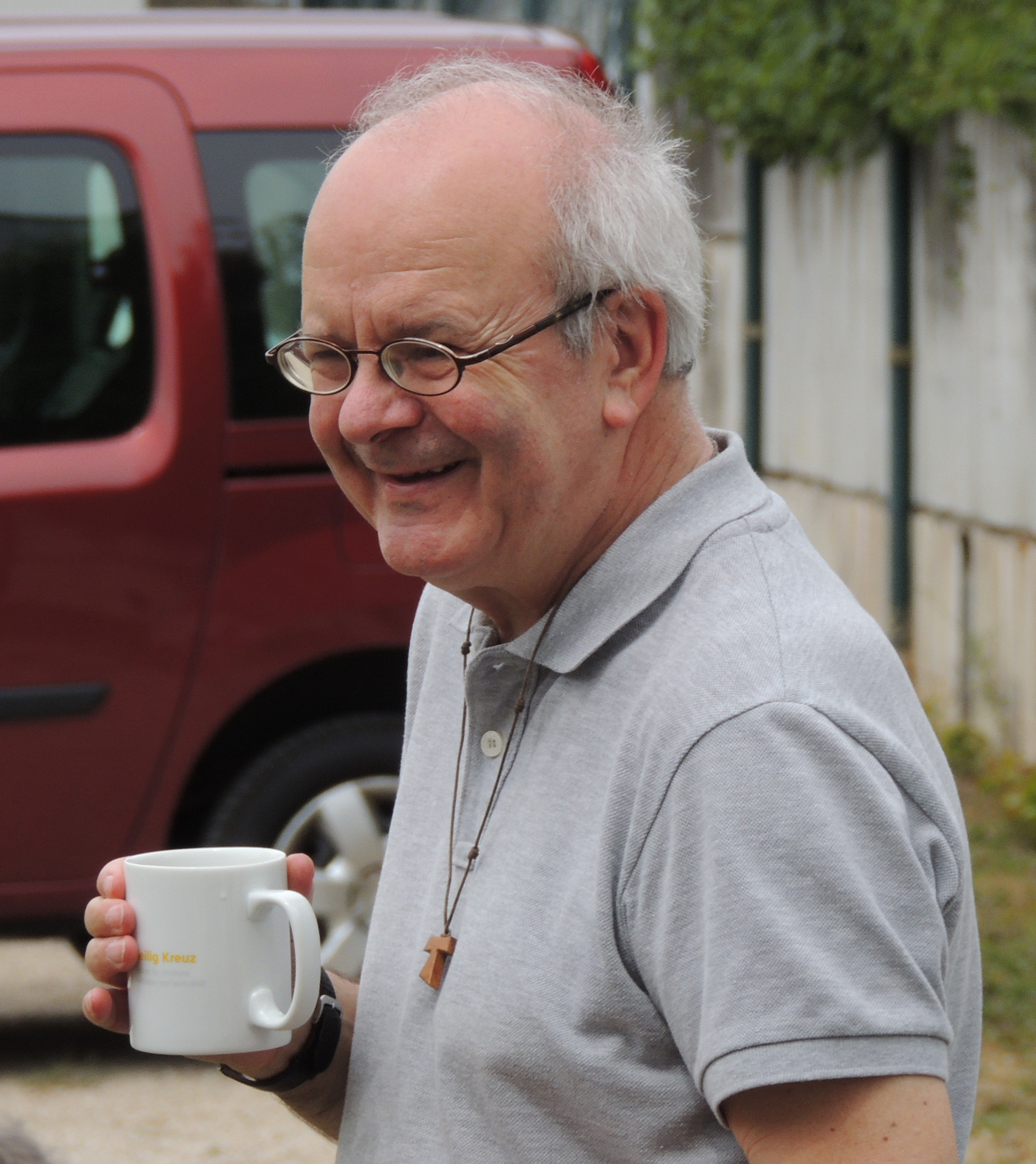
Helmut Schlegel, director of the centre from 2007 until 2018

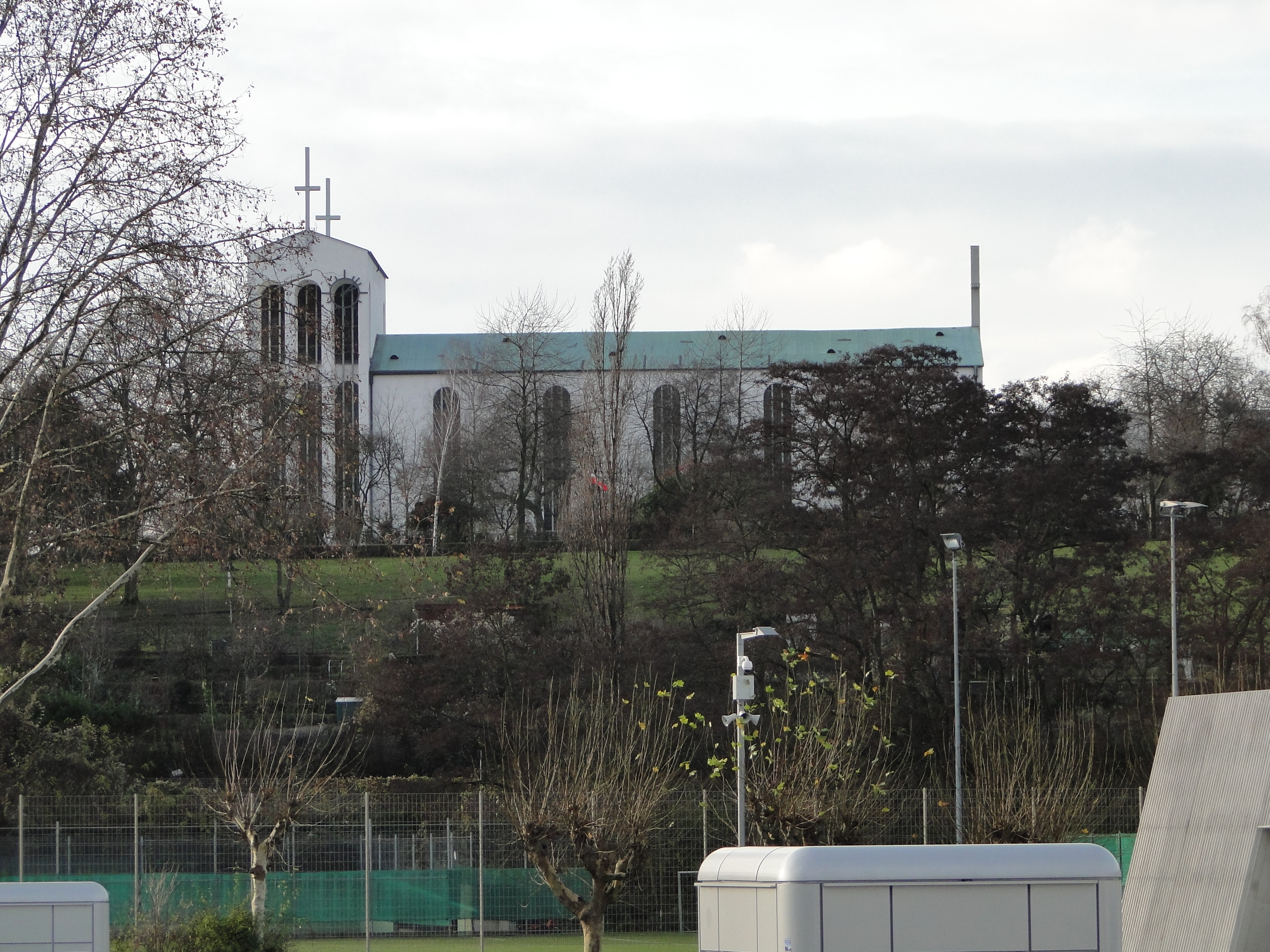
Holy Cross Church crowning the Bornheim slope

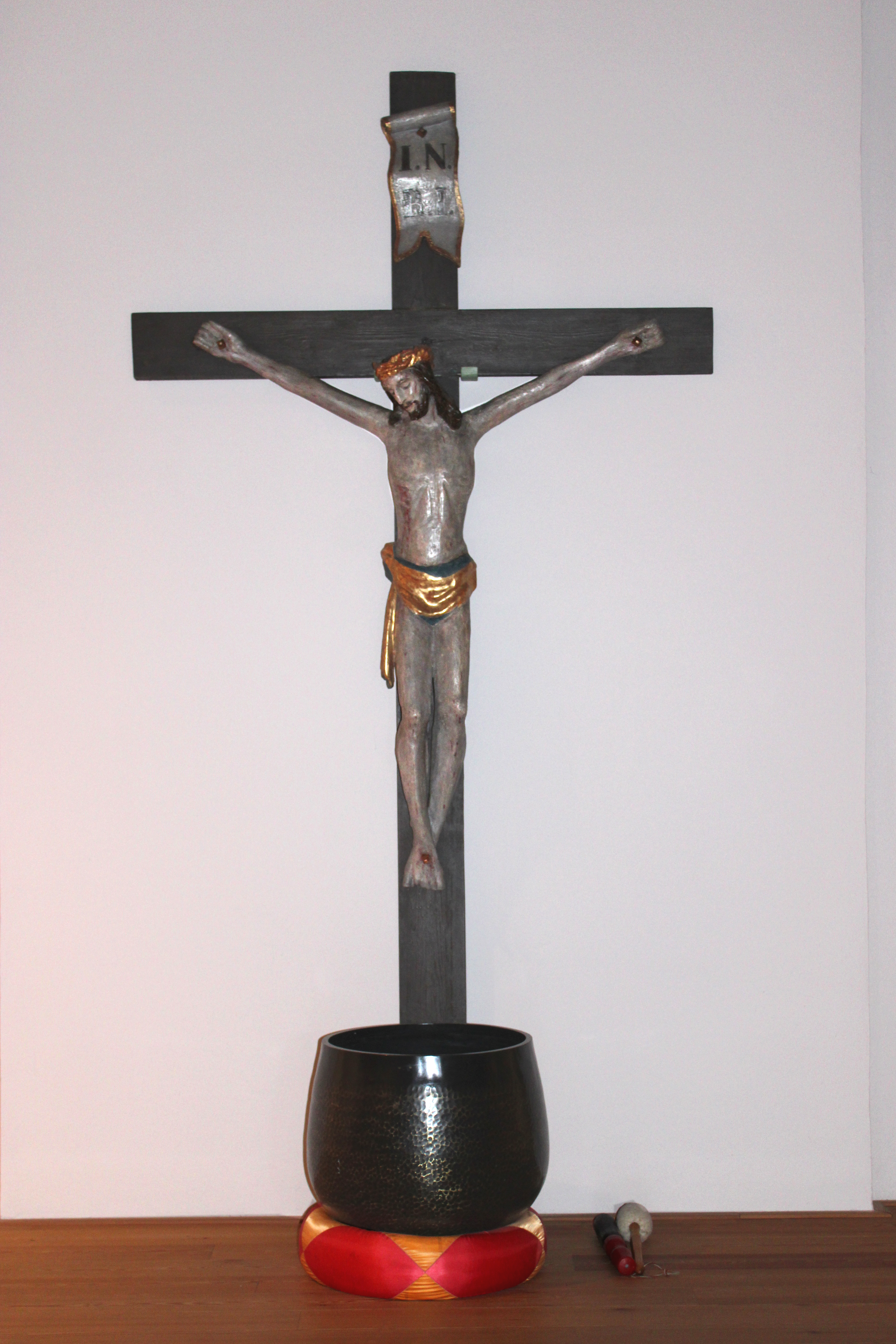
Wooden crucifix formerly owned by May, wife of Carl von Weinberg, in the crypt

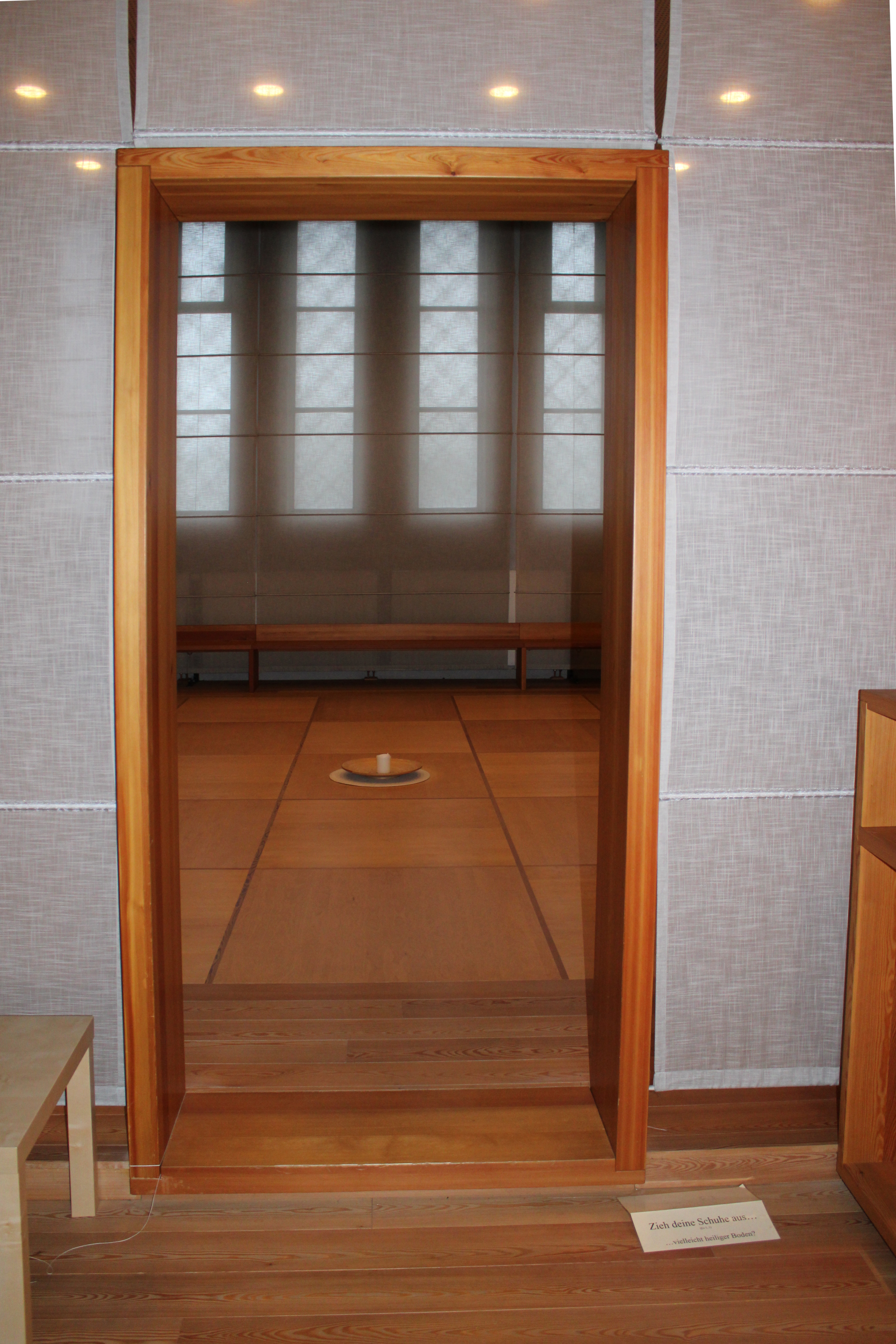
Entrance to the meditation area in the crypt
