= Franz-Peter Tebartz-van Elst =

German Catholic prelate and theologian (born 1959)

The Most Reverend Franz-Peter Tebartz-van Elst
- Bishop Emeritus of Limburg
- Tebartz-van Elst in 2012
- Church: Catholic
- See: Limburg
- In office: 28 November 2007 – 26 March 2014
- Predecessor: Franz Kamphaus
- Successor: Georg Bätzing
- Previous post: Auxiliary Bishop of Münster

Orders
- Ordination: 26 May 1985
- Consecration: 18 January 2004 by Reinhard Lettmann

Personal details
- Born: 20 November 1959 (age 66) Twisteden, Kleve, North Rhine-Westphalia, West Germany
- Coat of arms

Styles of Franz-Peter Tebartz-van Elst
- Reference style: The Most Reverend
- Spoken style: Your Excellency
- Religious style: Bishop

Franz-Peter Tebartz-van Elst (born 20 November 1959) is a German Catholic prelate and theologian. He was a vicar and an auxiliary bishop in Münster before becoming the Bishop of Limburg in January 2008. Pope Francis removed him from the exercise of his episcopal office on 23 October 2013 and on 26 March 2014 accepted his resignation as Bishop of Limburg, following a long-standing public dispute about the costs and financing of a diocesan construction project.

== Early life and career ==
Born on 20 November 1959, Tebartz-van Elst is the second of five children to a farming family in Twisteden, near the Catholic pilgrimage village of Kevelaer in North Rhine-Westphalia.

He studied philosophy and Catholic theology at the Wilhelms University of Münster and the Albert-Ludwigs-University of Freiburg. He completed further theological studies at the University of Notre Dame in Indiana. From 1990 to 1996 he was vicar and chaplain at St. Paul's Cathedral in Münster, before receiving a teaching appointment at the University of Münster. His work in pastoral theology focused on the baptism and catechism for adults, and his manual for adult baptism reflects his focus on the Catholic evangelism of adults in an increasingly secular Germany.

In 2003, Pope John Paul II named him titular bishop of Girus Tarasii and auxiliary for the Diocese of Münster.

== Bishop of Limburg ==
On 28 November 2007, Pope Benedict XVI appointed him Bishop of Limburg. In Limburg, he replaced Franz Kamphaus, whose liberal views had brought him into conflict with Pope John Paul II. Tebartz-van Elst, who had been popular with his clergy, was seen as a representative of Roman discipline and authority.

In 2008, Tebartz-van Elst admonished one of his priests, the Rev. Peter Kollas, for joining a Lutheran pastor in blessing a homosexual couple. The bishop argued that the relationship did not conform to Catholic teachings; Kollas argued that offering a blessing contradicted no norms of Catholic practice. Citing broken trust, the bishop removed Kollas from an administrative appointment within the diocese, while leaving him as parish priest of his local church in Wetzlar.

In 2012 Der Spiegel reported that Tebartz-van Elst and a travel companion flew to India in first class earlier that year, contradicting the Catholic Church's position on personal austerity. Tebartz-van Elst sued the magazine and swore in affidavits submitted to the court that he had travelled in business class using accumulated bonus miles. The state's attorney determined that he had actually flown in first class and cited him for perjury, for which he was fined €20,000.

=== Diocesan Centre St. Nicholas ===
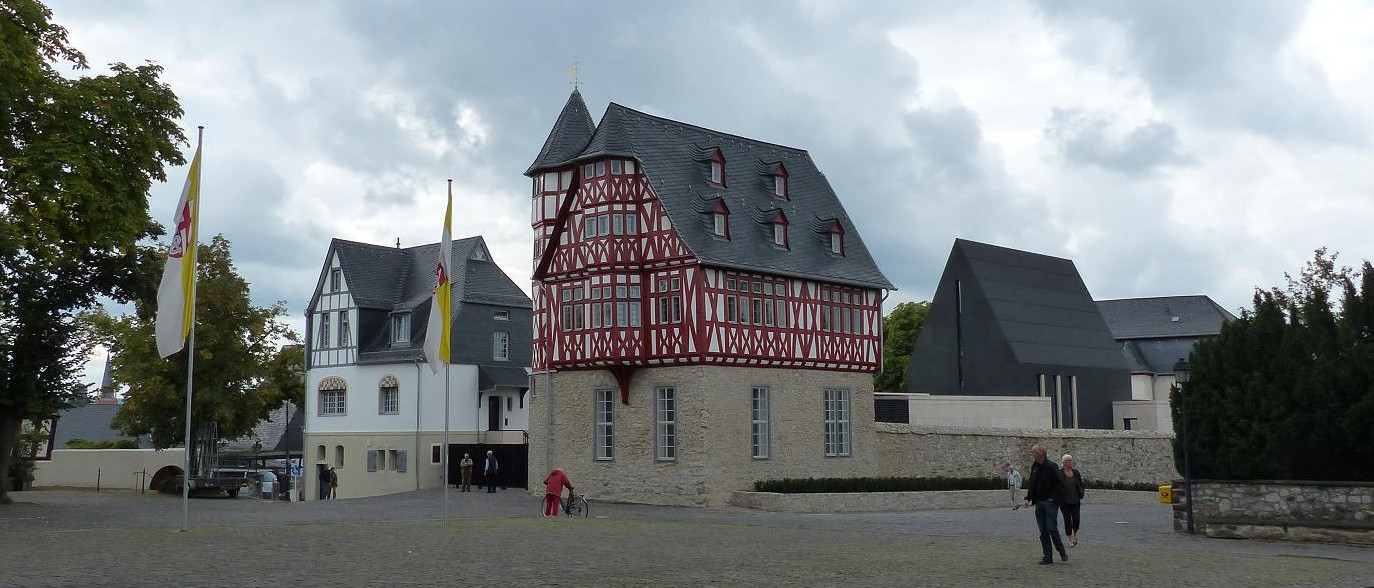
The diocesan centre St. Nikolaus in Limburg

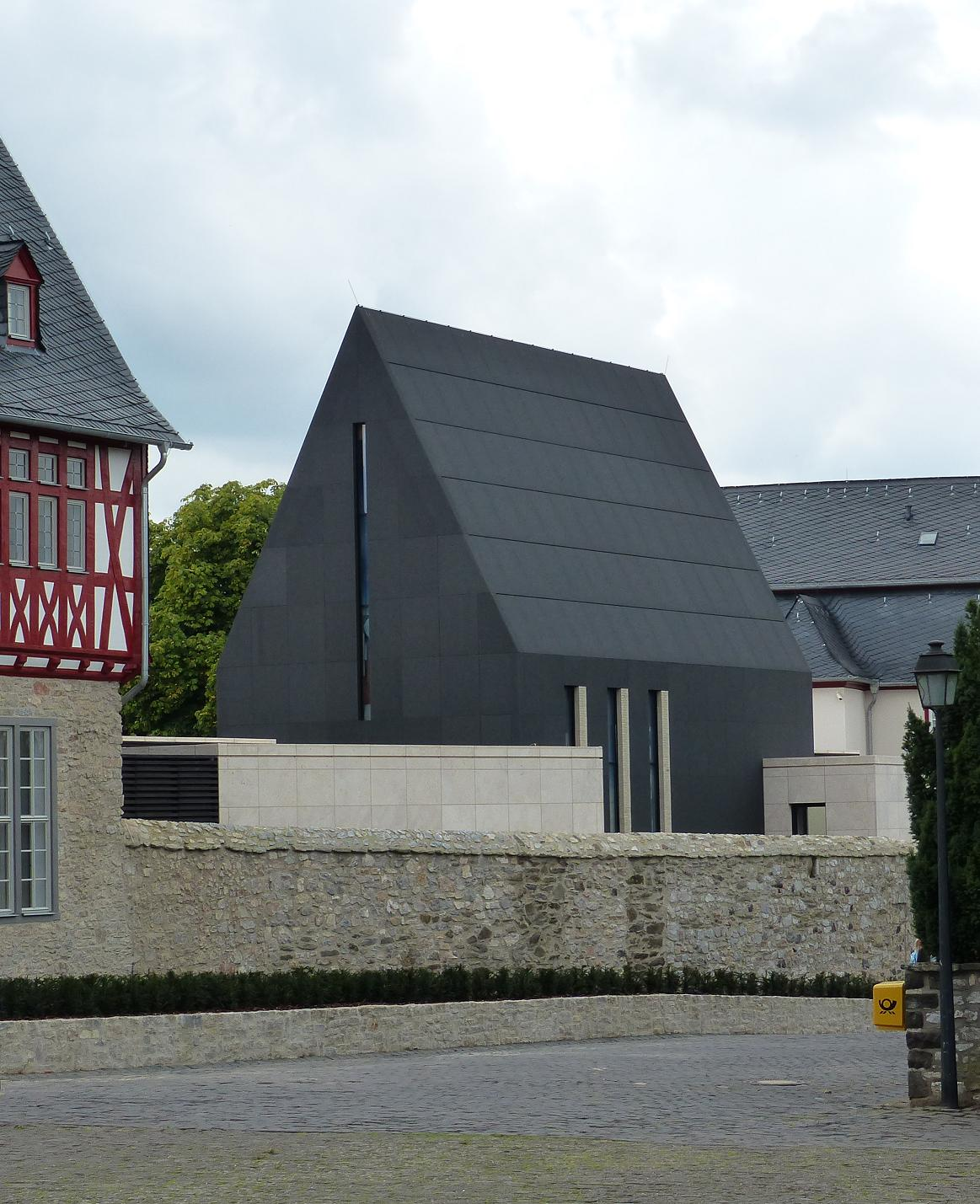
The Private Chapel of St. Maria, built 2012

In 2002, the Diocese of Limburg committed to financial austerity, cutting salaries and expenses. In that context, the diocese's 2007 announcement of plans for a €6 million building renovation project was criticised by some of the laity. The diocese announced it was allocating €5.5 million, with €200,000 for the bishop's apartment, €300,000 for his private chapel, €500,000 for the administrative and guest area, €2 million for the renovation of the historic walls and display of archaeological finds and €2.5 million for the rehabilitation of the old clergy house. Years later, on 14 October 2013, as the controversy continued, the project's architect Michael Frielinghaus said that the 2010 figure of €5.5 million was always understood to be well below the true cost of the project. When the building complex opened on 29 June 2013, the diocese announced that the final costs would be €9,850,000. It revised that number the next day after an internal audit committee complained that the number was totally unrealistic.

In September 2013, a Vatican inspector, Cardinal Giovanni Lajolo, visited Limburg to hold discussions with diocesan officials. A Vatican audit of the construction project determined that the costs of the project had grown to €31 million. Archbishop Robert Zollitsch, chair of the German Bishops' Conference warned that the Limburg scandal was affecting the Catholic Church throughout Germany and said he would discuss that impact with Pope Francis. He also set up a commission to investigate the finances of the Limburg diocese. A spokesman for the Limburg diocese said Tebartz-van Elst was "concerned about the escalation of the current discussion" and that "It is obvious to the bishop that the decision on his episcopal ministry in Limburg lies in the hands of the Holy Father."

=== Suspension and resignation ===
On 21 October 2013, Tebartz-van Elst met in Rome with Pope Francis, just after Cardinal Joachim Meisner, Archbishop of Cologne, met with the Pope. On 23 October 2013, Pope Francis suspended Tebartz-van Elst from the exercise of his episcopal office as Bishop of Limburg because he thought Tebartz van Elst could no longer exercise his duties as bishop. His statement noted the recent visit of the Vatican monitor and the investigation of the diocese's finances by the German Bishops. The pope named Wolfgang Rösch as vicar general, with the appointment to take effect immediately.

In January and February 2014, details of the German Bishops commission's investigation became known, including material sufficient to require an investigation by the public prosecutor, including evidence of the misuse of funds. The commission finalised its report on 4 March 2014.

On 26 March 2014, Pope Francis accepted Tebartz-van Elst's resignation as Bishop of Limburg. The Vatican statement said that a fruitful execution of a bishop's duty could no longer be expected from Tebartz-van Elst.

On 28 March 2014, Tebartz-van Elst met again with Pope Francis for a quarter-hour. Afterwards he told reporters that "with today's knowledge I realize I have made mistakes. Though I never intended to, I have destroyed trust."

Tebartz-van Elst defended himself. He said the vicar general was responsible for the deteriorating situation and that when he arrived he found the diocese had "an administrative situation which was ... hardly factual and disordered". He said he wanted to invest in high-quality construction in light of earlier problems with construction projects in the diocese.

After obtaining the report from the German Bishops commission, the state attorney in Limburg was examining whether Tebartz van-Elst's actions constituted a criminal offence.

== Later career ==
Following his resignation, Tebartz-van Elst moved to Regensburg. In December 2014, he was appointed to a position in the Roman Curia beginning in March 2015 as a delegate to the Pontifical Council for Promoting the New Evangelisation, assigned there to the International Council for Catechesis.

For several months in 2015, Apostolic Administrator Grothe and other officials of the Limburg diocese sought to hold Tebartz-van Elst personally liable for the construction costs. This raised legal questions that only the Vatican could resolve. In September, the Holy See announced following discussions between Grothe, the Congregation for Bishops, and the Secretariat of State, that the diocese would not initiate legal proceedings against Tebartz-van Elst.

== Sources ==
- Joachim Valentin (editor): Der "Fall" Tebartz-van Elst. Herder, Freiburg 2014, ISBN 978-3-451-31244-1.
- Otto Kettmann (editor): Limburg 2013 – Anatomie eines Skandals. LIT, Berlin 2016, ISBN 978-3-643-13337-3.
- Barbara Stühlmeyer (editress): Auf Christus getauft. Glauben leben und verkünden im 21. Jahrhundert. Butzon & Bercker, Kevelaer 2019, ISBN 978-3-7666-2488-8.
