= Kirchen (Sieg) =

- Town
- Coat of arms

- Location of Kirchen within Altenkirchen district
- Interactive map of Kirchen
- Location within Germany Location within Rhineland-Palatinate
- Coordinates: 50°48′31″N 7°53′0″E
- Country: Germany
- State: Rhineland-Palatinate
- District: Altenkirchen
- Municipal assoc.: Kirchen (Sieg)

Government
  - Mayor (2019–24): Andreas Hundhausen (SPD)

Area
  - Total: 39.76 km^{2} (15.35 sq mi)
- Elevation: 230 m (750 ft)

Population (2025-12-31)
  - Total: 8,199
  - Density: 206.2/km^{2} (534.1/sq mi)
- Time zone: UTC+01:00 (CET)
  - Summer (DST): UTC+02:00 (CEST)
- Postal codes: 57548
- Dialling codes: 02741
- Vehicle registration: AK
- Website: www.kirchen-sieg.de

Kirchen (Sieg) (German pronunciation: [ˈkɪʁçn̩]) is a town and Luftkurort (climatic spa) in the district of Altenkirchen in the north of Rhineland-Palatinate, Germany. It is situated on the river Sieg, approx. 12 km southwest of Siegen. Among its notable features is the Freusburg castle.

Kirchen is the seat of the Verbandsgemeinde Kirchen (Sieg) (Verbandsgemeinde, collective municipality).

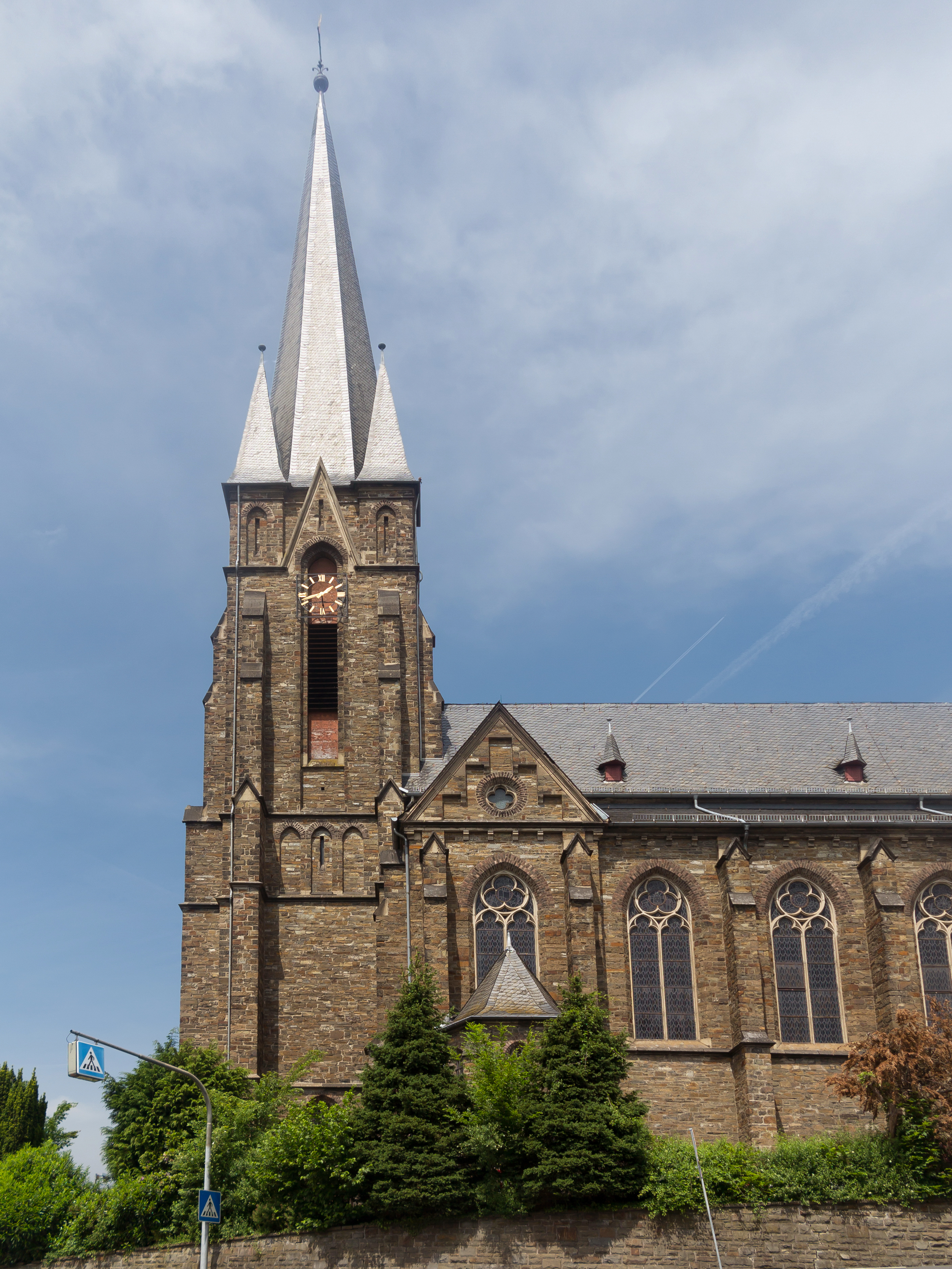
Church in Kirchen {Sieg}

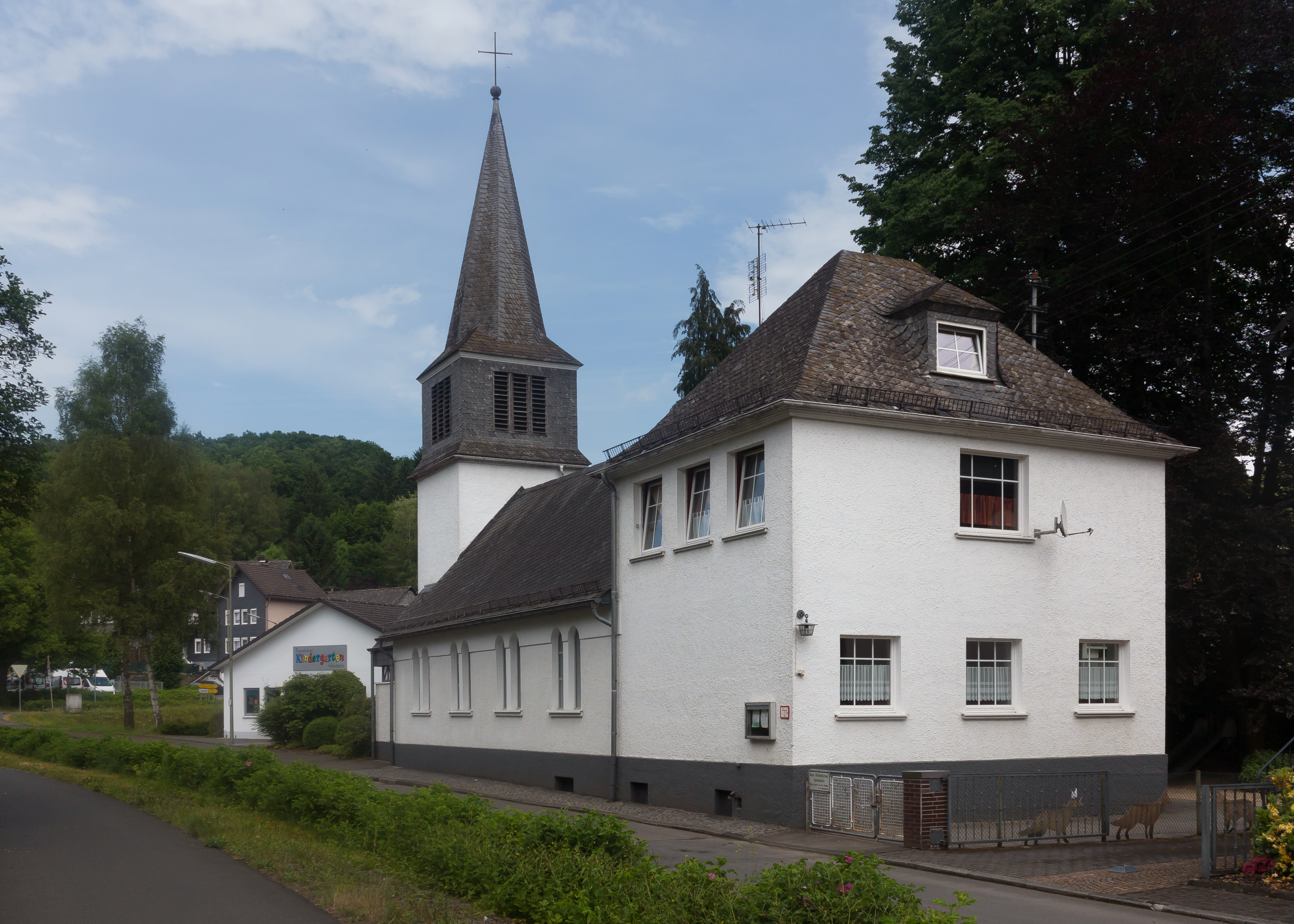
Wehbach, reformed church at the Gilsbachstrasse

== History ==
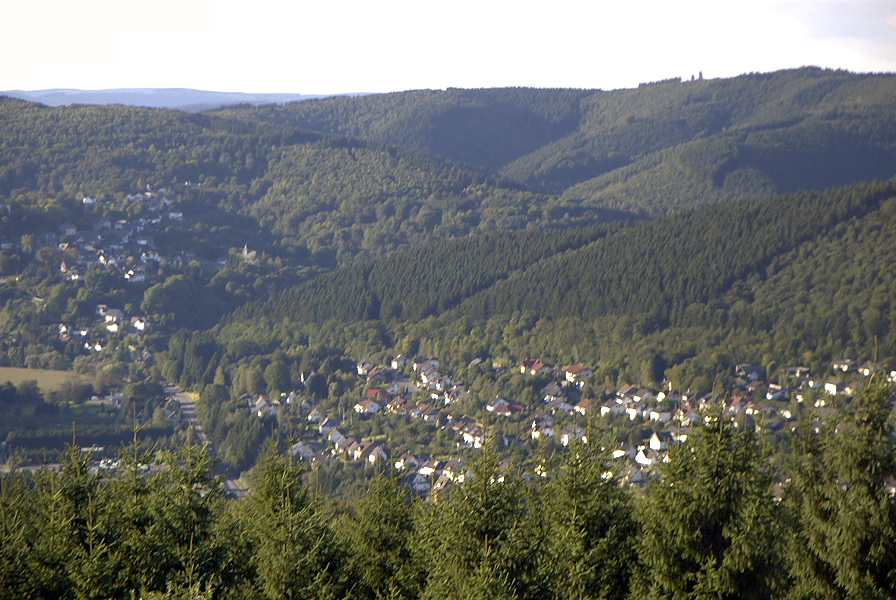
View from the Otto Tower

In early 1942, Kirchen and Wehbach were forcibly united with the Nazi government and renamed Kirchen-Wehbach (Sieg). Despite protests from the people of Wehbach, this merger and renaming persisted even after the end of the war for two and a half decades, until additional former municipalities were annexed. On 7 June 1969, the municipalities of Freusburg, Herkersdorf, Offhausen, Wingendorf, and Katzenbach, with the exception of the Unterbüdenholz district, which was incorporated into Brachbach, were amalgamated. On the same day, the municipality was renamed Kirchen (Sieg). Kirchen (Sieg) was granted town rights on 6 November 2004.

== Personalities ==
- Jürgen Alzen (born 1962), automobile racing driver
- Uwe Alzen (born 1967), automobile racing driver
- Georg Bätzing (born 1961), Catholic clergyman, bishop of Limburg
- Christoph Klein (born 1964), pediatric oncologist and medical director of the Haunersch Children 's Hospital of the Clinic of LMU Munich
- Heinrich Kraemer (1842-1907), mayor, parliamentary and state parliament deputy
- Thomas Kraft (born 1988), football player
- Barbara Rudnik (1958-2009), actress
- Luca Stolz (born 1995), automobile racing driver

== Transport ==
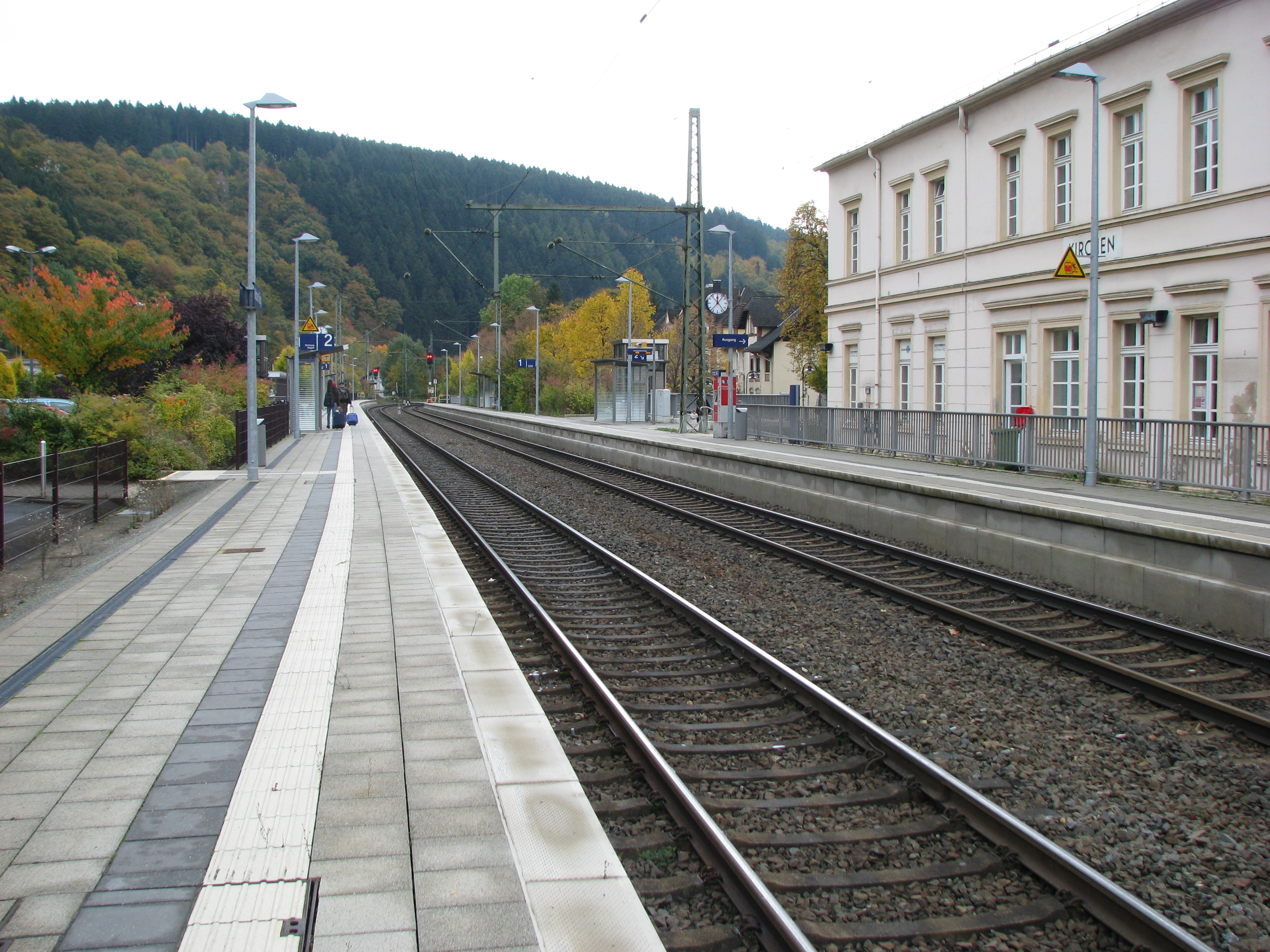
Kirchen train station

Kirchen station is located on the Sieg Railway and served by lines RE9, Rhein-Sieg-Express of DB, RB90 and RB93 of DreiLänderBahn, a section of Hessische Landesbahn (HLB). In the past there also was train service on the Kirchen - Freundesberg Railway, which has been closed. Kirchen is located in the area of the transport association Verkehrsverbund Rhein-Mosel (VRM), zones 926 and 932. At Kirchen train station there also is a park and ride parking lot for public transport users.
