= Wilhelm Kempf (bishop) =

German Catholic theologian and bishop (1906–1982)

- Bishop of Limburg
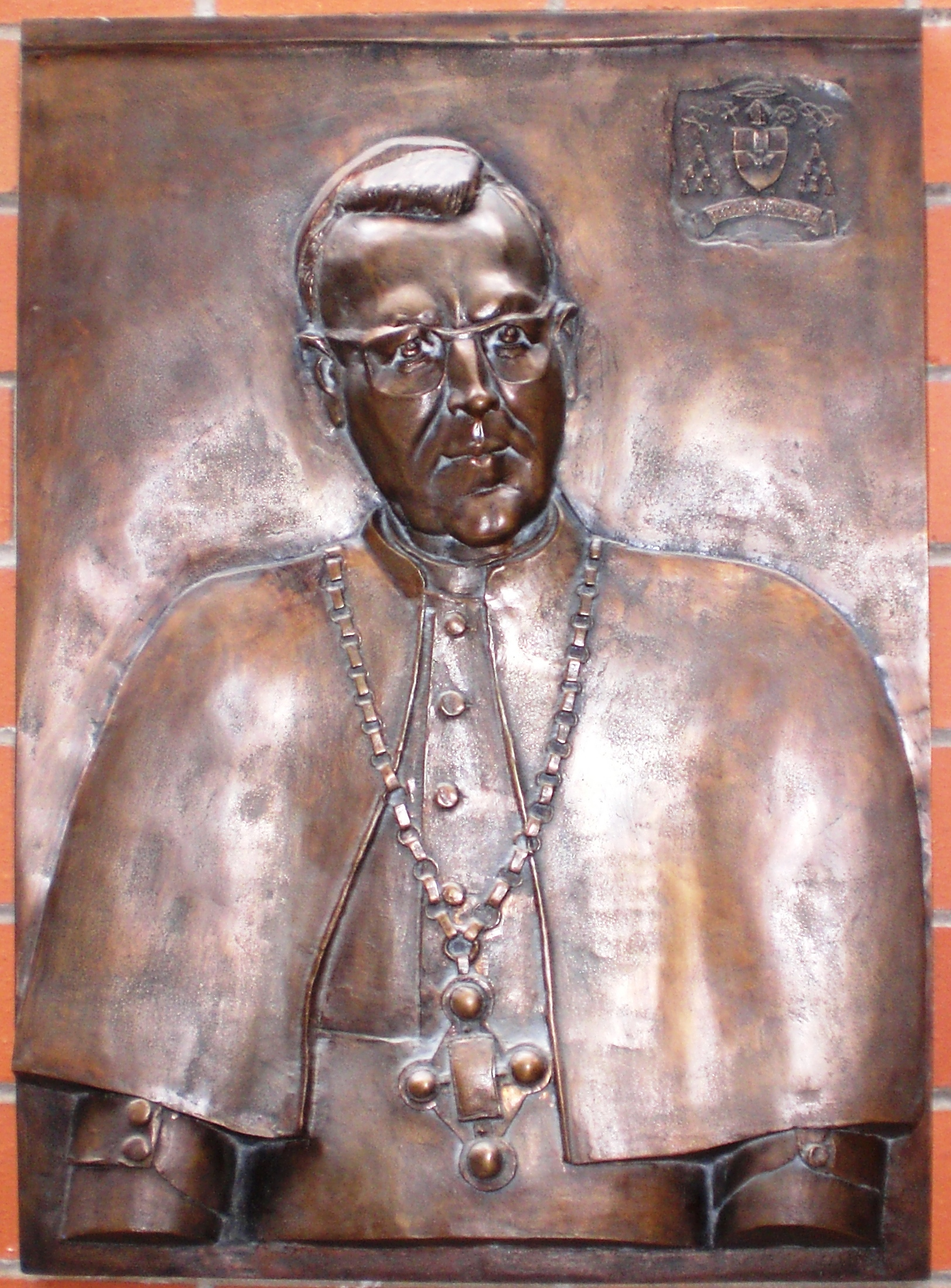
- Relief in the Wilhelm-Kempf-Haus, Wiesbaden
- Church: Catholic
- See: Limburg
- In office: 1949–1981
- Predecessor: Ferdinand Dirichs
- Successor: Franz Kamphaus
- Previous post: Heilig Geist, Frankfurt

Orders
- Consecration: 25 July 1949 by Joseph Frings

Personal details
- Born: 10 August 1906 Wiesbaden, Province of Hesse-Nassau, Kingdom of Prussia, German Empire
- Died: 9 October 1982 (aged 76) Wiesbaden, Hesse, West Germany
- Coat of arms

Wilhelm Kempf (10 August 1906 – 9 October 1982) was a German Catholic theologian who served between 1949 and 1981 as Bishop of Limburg. After the Second World War, he introduced the reforms of the Second Vatican Council to his Diocese.

== Career ==
Born in Wiesbaden on 10 August 1906, Kempf was the eldest of four sons of a middle school headmaster. He grew up in Wiesbaden. He studied theology and philosophy at the seminary for priests in Fulda, at the Gregoriana in Rome and at St. Georgen in Frankfurt, earning a PhD in Rome in 1928. He was consecrated as a priest on 8 December 1932 at Limburg Cathedral. After several positions as chaplain, Kempf became the parish priest of the Church of the Heilig Geist in Riederwald, part of Frankfurt, from 1942 to 1949. On 25 July 1949, Kempf was consecrated as Bishop of Limburg, succeeding Ferdinand Dirichs who had died in a car accident. He was ordained by Cardinal Joseph Frings, Archbishop of Cologne, assisted by Albert Stohr, Bishop of Mainz, and the US bishop and later first Apostolic Nuncio in the German Federal Republic, Aloisius Joseph Muench.

As bishop, Kempf contended with the aftermath of the war, including the rebuilding of damaged churches, integration of displaced persons (Heimatvertriebene), and establishment of new parishes in the major cities of Frankfurt and Wiesbaden. He took part in the Second Vatican Council between 1962 and 1965 and introduced its changes in the diocese in an exemplary way. He promoted spiritual discourse and open dialogue ("geistige Auseinandersetzung und offenen Dialog), introduced liturgical reform, and a structure in which priest and lay people cooperated. Particularly interested in church music, he founded the Limburger Domsingknaben boys' choir in 1967. From 1969, he gave more influence to the councils of mostly lay people who were democratically elected in parishes. He was regarded as conservative but tolerant and open to reform.

On 10 August 1981, his 75th birthday, Kempf requested his retirement, which was granted. He died on 9 October 1982 in Wiesbaden and is buried in the Limburg Cathedral.

== Awards and legacy ==
In 1973, Kempf was awarded the Großes Verdienstkreuz of the Federal Republic, to which a star and Schulterband were added in 1981. He was made an honorary citizen of Wiesbaden in 1976. The University of Tübingen awarded an honorary doctorate of theology to him in 1981. He was also an honorary citizen of Limburg from 18 June 1974.

The central meeting house of the diocese of Limburg in Wiesbaden-Naurod, which he had planned as a place of spiritual intercourse and open dialogue, is named after him.

== Publications ==
Kempf's publications include:

- Glaubensüberzeugung und Geistesfreiheit. Knecht, Frankfurt am Main 1962
- Auf dein Wort hin. Briefe des Bischofs von Limburg an die Gemeinden des Bistums zur österlichen Bußzeit 1972-1981. Verlag des Bischöflichen Ordinariats, Limburg, ISBN 3-921221-01-3
- Für euch und für alle. Brief des Bischofs von Limburg zur Fastenzeit 1981 an die Gemeinden des Bistums, besonders an die Fernstehenden. Verlag des Bischöflichen Ordinariats, Limburg 1981, ISBN 3-921221-02-1

== Literature ==
- Walther Kampe: Ein Leben für die Kirche: Festrede zum 75. Geburtstag von Dr. Wilhelm Kempf. Knecht, Frankfurt am Main 1981, ISBN 3-7820-0468-X
- Martin Persch (1992). "Wilhelm Kempf (bishop)". In Bautz, Friedrich Wilhelm (ed.). Biographisch-Bibliographisches Kirchenlexikon (BBKL) (in German). Vol. 3. Herzberg: Bautz. cols. 1340–1343. ISBN 3-88309-035-2.
