= Ferdinand Dirichs =

German Roman Catholic bishop

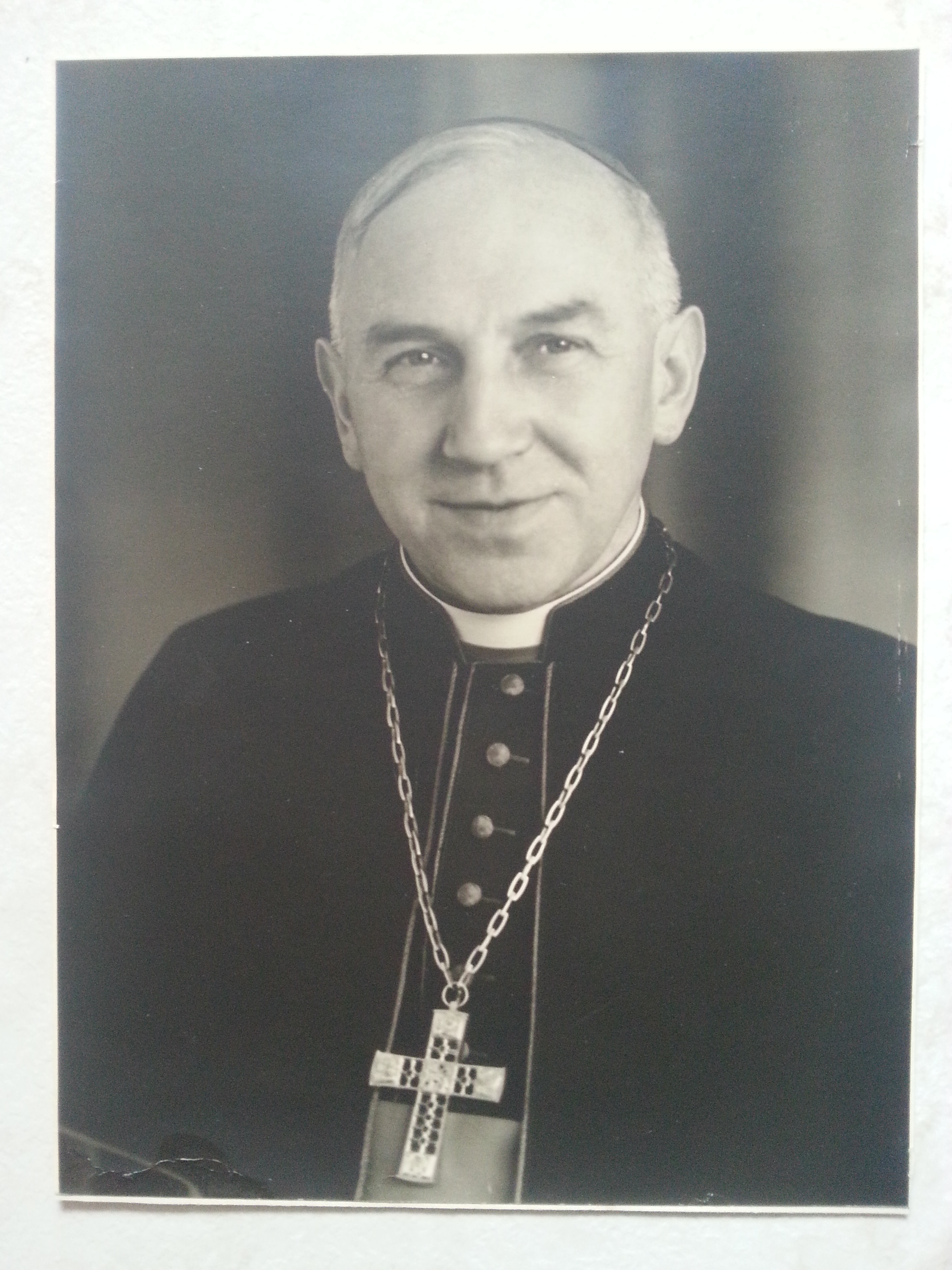

Coat of arms of Ferdinand Dirichs.

Ferdinand Dirichs (24 November 1894 – 27 December 1948) was a German Roman Catholic bishop.

Dirichs was born in Germany and was ordained to the priesthood in 1922. He served as bishop of the Roman Catholic Diocese of Limburg from 1947 until his death in 1948.
