= Georg Bätzing =

German bishop and theologian

The Most Reverend Georg Bätzing
- Bishop of Limburg
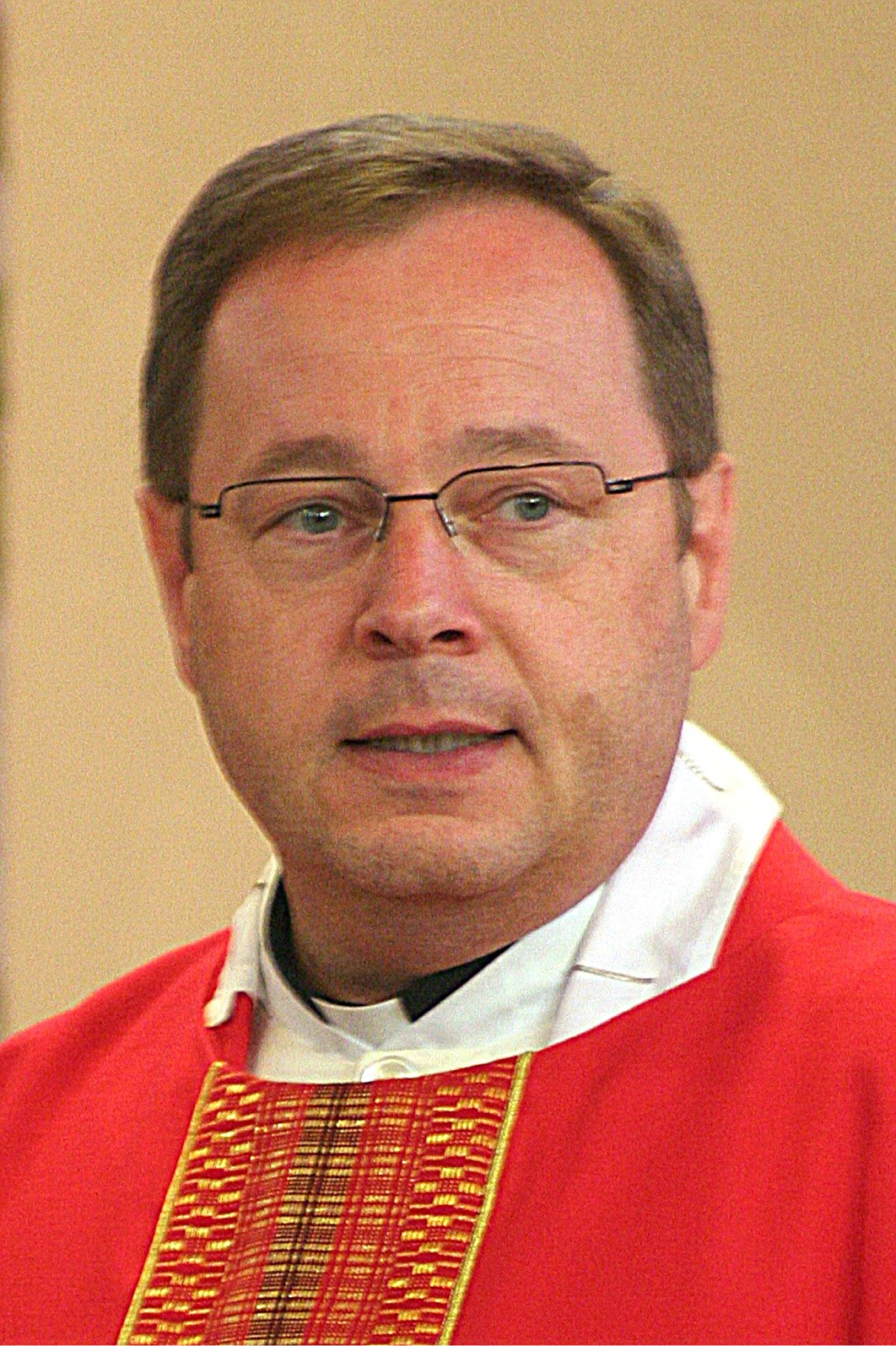
- Bätzing in 2009
- Church: Catholic
- See: Limburg
- Appointed: 1 July 2016
- Installed: 18 September 2016
- Predecessor: Franz-Peter Tebartz-van Elst

Orders
- Ordination: 18 July 1987
- Consecration: 18 September 2016 by Rainer Maria Woelki, Manfred Grothe & Stephan Ackermann

Personal details
- Born: 13 April 1961 (age 65) Kirchen, West Germany
- Motto: Congrega in unum (Gather into one)
- Coat of arms

Georg Bätzing (born 13 April 1961) is a German Catholic prelate who has served as Bishop of Limburg since 2016 and chairman of the German Bishops' Conference from March 2020 to February 2026.

He is known for his progressive views and heading the Bishops' Conference during the controversial Synodal Way conferences and its subsequent reform plan.

== Early life and career ==
Bätzing was born in Kirchen and grew up in Niederfischbach. He was an altar boy, sang in the church choir, and served as an organist there. After his Abitur, he entered the major seminary of the Diocese of Trier. He studied theology and philosophy at Trier University and Freiburg University, graduating in 1985.

As a deacon, he was assigned to Sankt Wendel. He was ordained a priest in Trier on 18 July 1987 by Bishop Hermann Josef Spital. He worked as assistant priest (Kaplan) at the pilgrimage church Maria Heimsuchung in Klausen and in the parish of St. Josef in Koblenz until 1990. He then was vice-rector (Subregens) of the Trier major seminary until 1996. That same year he received his doctorate and became rector (Regens) of the seminary. One of his functions was the organization of the Heilig-Rock-Wallfahrt in Trier in 2012, a pilgrimage to the most important relic of the Trier Cathedral, the seamless robe of Jesus, which was displayed in the cathedral from 13 April 2012 for the first time since 1996.

On 1 November 2012, Bätzing was appointed vicar general of the Diocese of Trier.

== Bishop ==
In 2016, he was elected by the Limburg Cathedral chapter (Domkapitel) to succeed Franz-Peter Tebartz-van Elst as bishop of Limburg. Bätzing's appointment as bishop by Pope Francis was later announced on 1 July 2016. He was consecrated by Archbishop Rainer Woelki of Cologne on 18 September 2016.

From 2020 to 2026, Bätzing was the chairman of the German Bishops' Conference.

In May 2023, Cardinals Pietro Parolin, Marc Ouellet, and Luis Ladaria Ferrer wrote a letter to Bätzing as chairman of the German Bishops on the Synodal Way. It stated that the German bishops "are not empowered to create a governing or decision-making synodal assembly" made up of clergy and laity.

== Positions ==
In 2019, Bätzing said that he would support a voluntary celibacy of priests. Bätzing supports the ordination of women in the Catholic church.

He has supported the secular legalisation of civic marriage between homosexual people who are "faithful in their relationship".

Bätzing is a proponent of intercommunion with Protestants and he gives the Holy Eucharist to any Protestant who asks for it.

In 2021, he told KNA that he was "not happy" that the Vatican had now decided to participate so determinedly in the debate on blessings for homosexual couples. He added that "It suggests that one wants to end the ongoing controversial theological discussions [on the subject] in various parts of the World Church, including in Germany, as soon as possible".

In March 2022, in an interview with Bunte, he stated that sex outside of marriage is not a sin and that same-sex relationships are "OK if it's done in fidelity and responsibility".

In May 2022, Bätzing expressed disappointment that Pope Francis had not changed the teachings of the Catholic Church regarding homosexuality and women's ordination. Citing the public departure of Andreas Sturm, the former vicar general of the Diocese of Speyer who had left the Roman Catholic Church to join the German Old Catholic Church, Bätzing said that he too would consider leaving the church if he "got the impression that nothing would ever change."

In November 2022, Bätzing spoke at a news conference at the end of a week of talks between Pope Francis and Vatican officials on one side, and all of Germany's bishops on the other. Their focus was on the progressive Synodal Path, a series of conferences of the Catholic Church in Germany to discuss a range of contemporary theological and organizational questions concerning the Catholic Church, as well as possible reactions to the sexual abuse crisis in the Catholic Church in Germany. "As far as the ordination of women is concerned, for example, (the Vatican's) view is very clear, that the question is closed. But the question exists and it has to be elaborated on and discussed," Bätzing said. "All these questions are on the table (of the German Synodal Path) and all attempts to cancel them will not have success," he said. "Popes have tried to say the question (of women priests) is closed but the fact is that the question exists. Many young women say 'a church that refuses all of this cannot be my church in the long run.'"

In late August 2024, a week before the 2024 Thuringian state election, Bätzing stated that Christians could not vote for political parties like the Alternative for Germany.

== Publications ==
Doctoral dissertation:

- Kirche im Werden. Ekklesiologische Aspekte des Läuterungsgedankens, Trierer theologische Studien 56, Trier: Paulinus, 1996, ISBN 978-3-7902-1284-6

Spiritual writings and published homilies

- Die Eucharistie als Opfer der Kirche (1986)
- Suchbewegungen (2000)
- Helfer im Einsatz Gottes (2001)
- Der Kreuzweg Jesu Christi (2003)
- Bleib doch bei uns, Herr (2005)
- Das Leben ausloten (2006)
- Gott der kleinen Leute (2007)
- Es gibt keine größere Liebe (2007)
- Nachgefragt. Hilfen zum Verständnis des christlichen Glaubens (2008)
- Beten üben. Anleitung zu einer christlichen Gebetspraxis (2009)
- Das Trierer Christusgebet. Entstehung, Auslegung und Praxis eines Elementes bistumseigener Gebetstradition (2010)
- Jesus Christus, Heiland und Erlöser. Impulse auf dem Weg der Erlösung (2011)
