= Franz Kamphaus =

German Roman Catholic prelate (1932–2024)

- Bishop Emeritus of Limburg
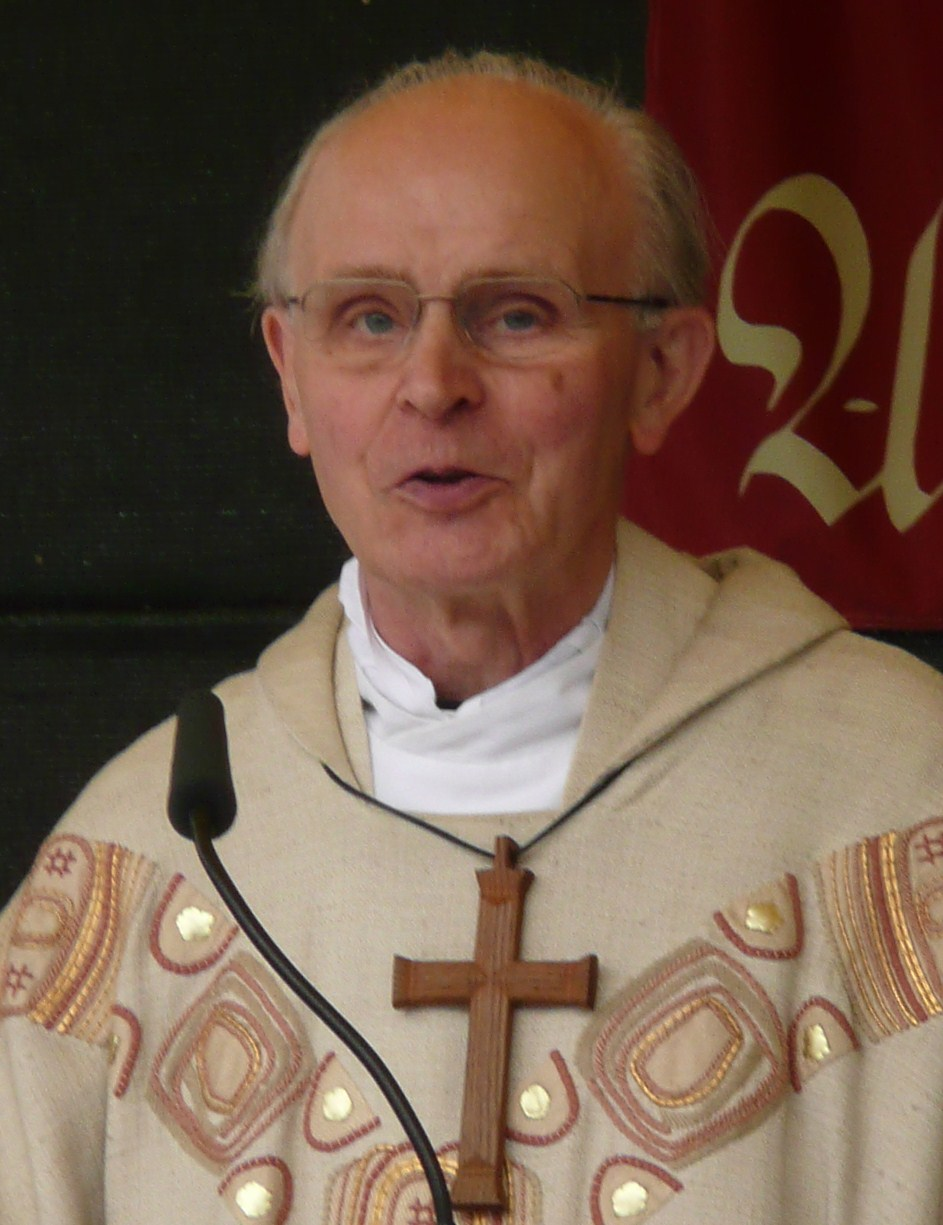
- Kamphaus in 2008
- Archdiocese: Cologne
- Diocese: Limburg
- Appointed: 3 May 1982
- Term ended: 2 February 2007
- Predecessor: Wilhelm Kempf
- Successor: Franz-Peter Tebartz-van Elst

Orders
- Ordination: 21 February 1959 by Michael Keller
- Consecration: 13 June 1982 by Joseph Höffner

Personal details
- Born: 2 February 1932 Lüdinghausen, Westphalia, Prussia, Germany
- Died: 28 October 2024 (aged 92) Aulhausen, Hesse, Germany
- Education: University of Münster; Ludwig-Maximilians-Universität München
- Motto: "Evangelizare pauperibus"
- Coat of arms

Franz Kamphaus (2 February 1932 – 28 October 2024) was a German Catholic prelate, bishop emeritus of the Diocese of Limburg. He was bishop of the diocese from 1982 after teaching pastoral theology and homiletics at the University of Münster. He was the only German bishop to oppose Pope John Paul II in the matter of counseling pregnant women in conflict situations. After his term ended in 2007, he took residence in the St. Vincenzstift, Aulhausen, a home for people with physical and mental disabilities, where he first served as priest.

== Career ==
=== Münster ===
Born in Lüdinghausen as the fifth child of a peasant family, Kamphaus achieved his Abitur from the Collegium Augustinianum Gaesdonck. He studied theology and philosophy at the University of Münster and the Ludwig-Maximilians-Universität München, and he was ordained as a priest on 21 February 1959 by the bishop of Münster, Michael Keller. He worked as Kaplan (assistant minister) in Münster and Ahaus. From 1964, he was responsible for the diocese's Predigtausbildung (education for sermon).

Kamphaus obtained a doctoral degree at the University of Münster in 1968 with the dissertation Von der Exegese zur Predigt. Über die Problematik einer schriftgemäßen Verkündigung der Oster-, Wunder- und Kindheitsgeschichten, on the topic of preaching about the biblical stories of Easter, miracles and the youth of Jesus. From 1971, he led the diocese's continuing education of preachers. From 1972, he taught pastoral theology and homiletics at the University of Münster. From 1973, he was also Regens (director) of the diocese's Priesterseminar, the seminary for candidates for the priesthood.

=== Limburg ===
On 3 May 1982, Pope John Paul II announced Kamphaus as bishop of Limburg. He was ordained on 13 June by cardinal Joseph Höffner. He chose as his motto "Evangelizare pauperibus" ("preach the gospel to the poor"), quoted from Luke 4:18. His bishop's cross was made from a beam of the farmhouse where he grew up. Kamphaus lived in an apartment in the Priesterseminar, while a family of refugees lived in the bishop's residence. He spoke of a "Bundesrepublik Erde" (Federal Republic of Earth) granting peace, freedom and justice for all, and said that Christians need to stand side by side with the victims, the hungry, the injured, those who flee and cry.

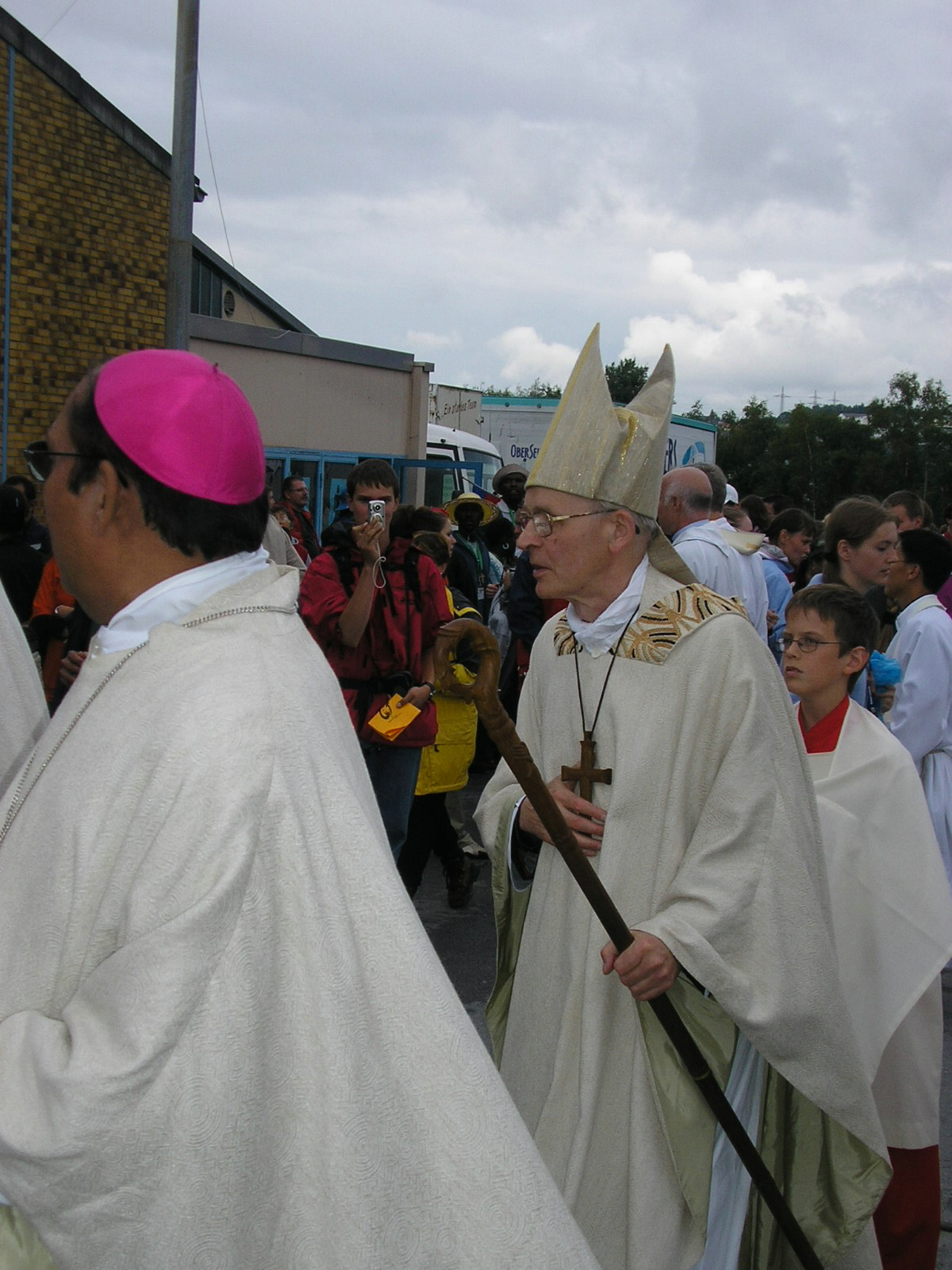
The bishop at the final open air service of the diocese's "Tage der Begegnung" as part of World Youth Day, 15 August 2005

In 1999, Kamphaus was the only German bishop who opposed the pope in the matter of Schwangerschaftskonfliktberatung, the counseling of pregnant women in difficult situations. In his diocese, women were able to receive "Beratungsscheine" (certificates after counseling) which made unpunished abortions possible. He said that prayer and meditation helped him to take the side of the women in need, against the pope. A letter from the pope received by Kamphaus on 7 March 2002 stripped the bishop from his responsibilities for the counseling in his diocese. Kamphaus said: "I am still convinced that our way of counselling women would save the lives of many more children". A private association, "Donum vitae", took over the counseling, as in other dioceses before.

From 1999 to 2006, Kamphaus was president of the Kommission Weltkirche of the German Bishops' Conference which is responsible for international collaboration and the dialogue between religions. He travelled to Africa, Asia and Latin America, requesting more solidarity and social justice.

On his 75th birthday, Kamphaus submitted his resignation to Pope Benedict XVI, who accepted it. A farewell service was held in a vespers service that day. His successor was Franz-Peter Tebartz-van Elst.

=== Aulhausen ===
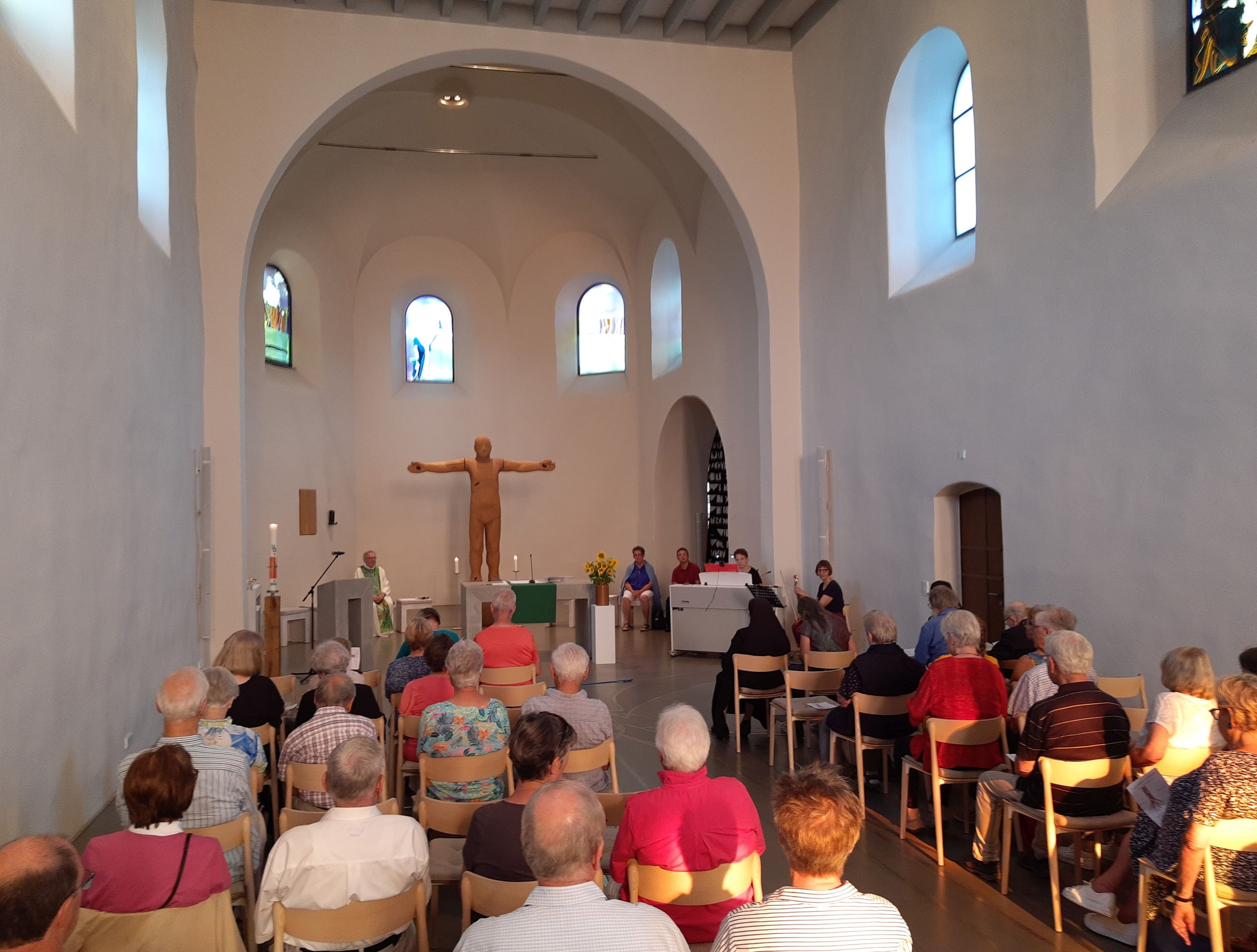
Attending a service (second row, right) at the Marienkirche Aulhausen, 1 September 2024

After his retirement, Kamphaus served as priest of the St. Vincenzstift, Aulhausen, a home for people with physical and mental disabilities. He realised that the humanity of a society can be seen in its way to deal with illness and disabilities in all phases of life. Kamphaus himself suffered from tremor. Facing the challenge to preach for handicapped people, he said: "Es geht darum, unsere großen biblischen Wörter zu elementarisieren, ohne dabei banal zu werden" (We need to simplify our big biblical words without getting trivial). He stressed the importance of songs for the mostly illiterate people, and he said: "Das Allerwichtigste ist, einfach da zu sein. Entscheidend ist nicht so sehr, was ich sage oder tue, sondern dass ich hier wohne und lebe." (Most important is to simply be there. It's not important what I say or do, but that I live here). He remained a resident of the facility when he retired from service as a priest, and kept writing books.

Kamphaus died on 28 October 2024, at the age of 92. Boris Rhein, minister-president of Hesse, commented that he shaped not only the Catholic Church, living in integrity and humanity as a model for engagement for the poor and disadvantaged, in service to the community.

== Awards ==
Kamphaus accepted only two of the many awards offered to him:

- 10 January 2004 Ignatz-Bubis-Preis of Frankfurt
- 13 June 2007 honorary citizen of Limburg

== Publications ==
A compilation of texts by Franz Kamphaus was published in 2013, titled Mach's wie Gott, werde Mensch (Do It like God, Become Human).

- Von der Exegese zur Predigt. Dissertation University of Münster. Matthias-Grünewald-Verlag, Mainz 1968, OCLC 721986926
- Gospels for Preachers and Teachers. Sheed & Ward Ltd 1974, ISBN 0-72207411-5
- Die Welt zusammenhalten. Reden gegen den Strom. Herder, 2008, ISBN 978-3-451-29754-0
- Gott ist kein Nostalgiker. Anstöße für die Fasten- und Osterzeit. Herder, 2012, ISBN 978-3-451-33329-3
- Mach's wie Gott, werde Mensch Herder, 2013, ISBN 978-3-451-32586-1
- Tastender Glaube: Inspirationen zum Matthäus-Jahr (in German). Ostfildern: Patmos Verlag. 2016. ISBN 978-3-8436-0782-7.

Catholic Church titles
Preceded by Wilhelm Kempf	Bishop of Limburg; 1982–2007	Succeeded by Franz-Peter Tebartz-van Elst
