= Andreas Boltz =

German church musician and composer

- Born: 13 July 1964 (age 61); Würzburg, Germany
- Education: Hochschule für Musik Würzburg
- Occupations: Church musician; Concert organist; Composer
- Organization: Frankfurt Cathedral
- Website: www.andreasboltz.de

Andreas Boltz (born 13 July 1964) is a German church musician and composer. From autumn 1993 until 2011, he was the Regional Cantor of the diocese of Mainz in Darmstadt. He was awarded the Premio Speciale in 1992 at the International Composers Competition in Trieste. Since June 2011, he has been cathedral music director at the Frankfurt Cathedral.

== Life ==
Boltz was born in Würzburg. He studied Catholic church music at the Hochschule für Musik Würzburg. In 1989 he passed the A Diploma and the State music teachers examination.

In 1992 he earned his Master Class Diploma of artistic organ playing in the master class of Günther Kaunzinger. He studied further with Fritz ter Wey and Eric Ericson (choral conducting), Daniel Roth, Françoise Renet, Guy Bovet and Jon Laukvik (organ), Glen Wilson (harpsichord), Kurt Suttner (vocal physiology) and Zsolt Gárdonyi (composition).

From 1989 to 1993 he was assistant to the Kapellmeister at the Würzburg Cathedral. From autumn 1993 until 2011, he was the Regional Cantor of the diocese of Mainz in Darmstadt and lecturer in choral conducting and organ at the Institut für Kirchenmusik Mainz (Institute of Sacred Music Mainz).

As organist and choir director, he recorded for the broadcasters ZDF, Bayerischer Rundfunk, Hessischer Rundfunk, Deutschlandfunk, ORF, RAI, and Catalunya Ràdio. Concerts as a soloist and accompanist led him to many European countries. From 1994 to 1995 he prepared the choir Musikverein Darmstadt for performances with the Staatstheater Darmstadt. In 1995, he founded the project choir Vocalensemble Darmstadt and conducted the group of about 35 people until 2011.

His compositional activity was awarded a Premio Speciale in 1992 at the International Composers Competition in Trieste. In 1998 he was commissioned to compose for the concluding mass of the Katholikentag in Mainz. In 2006, he composed Saphir for the Frankfurt Book Fair, a stage work based on a parable by the Indian author Dilip Chitre. In fall 2010, his musical theatre production Das wahre Buenos Aires was premiered in Frankfurt in collaboration with the cultural association "con tempo".

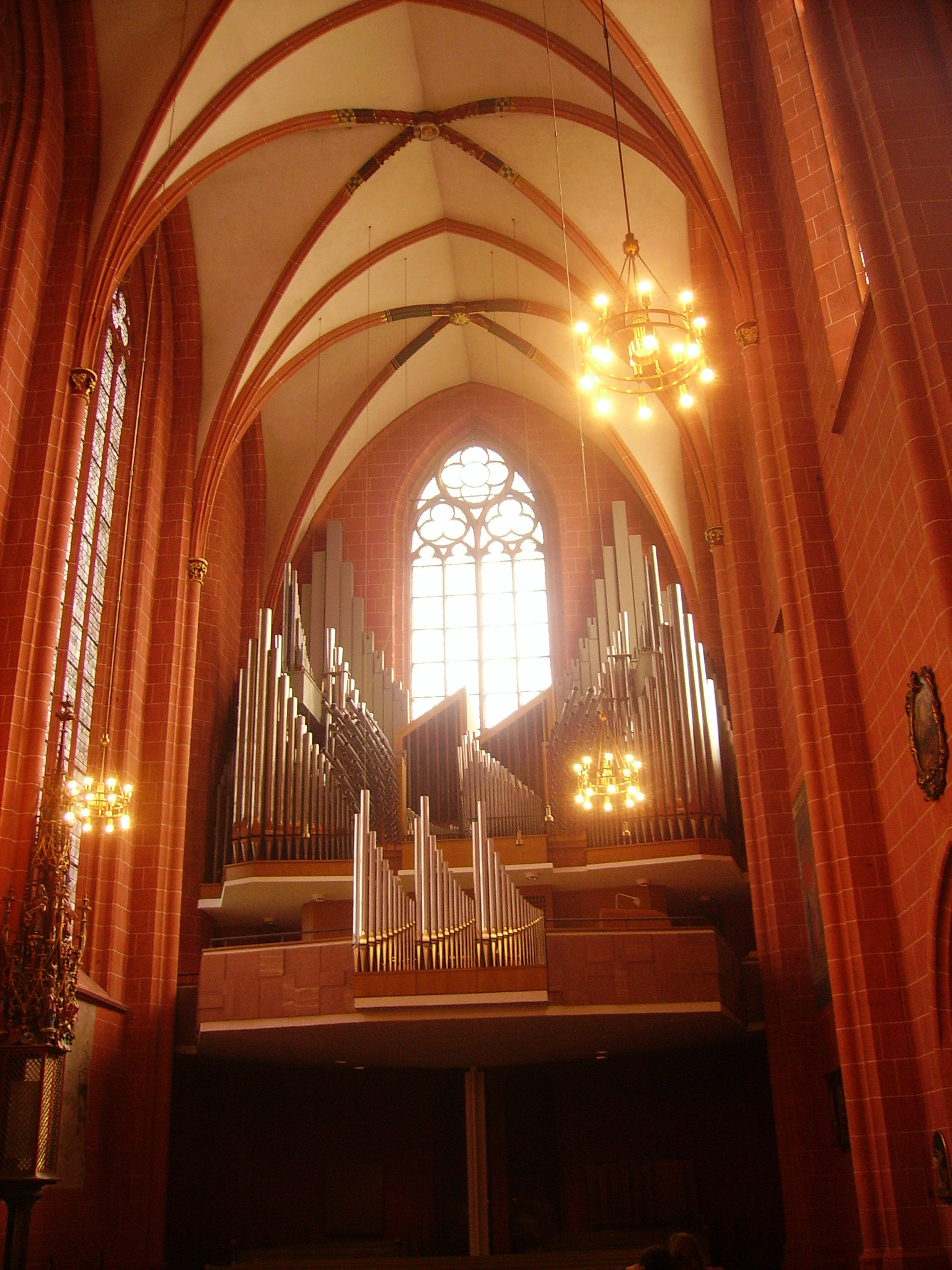
Klais Organ of the Frankfurt Cathedral

Since June 2011, Andreas Boltz has been Dommusikdirektor (cathedral music director) at the Frankfurt Cathedral, the Kaiserdom St. Bartholomäus (Imperial Cathedral St. Bartholomew). Since September rehearsals began for a Domsingschule to be built under his direction, following the example of the Thomasschule in Leipzig.

As a composer, he participated in the project Mainzer Bistumsmesse (Mass of the Mainz Diocese), a collaboration of six regional cantors to create a mass in German for choir, a high voice (children's choir or soprano) and organ. Dan Zerfaß composed Herr, erbarme dich, Nicolo Sokoli Ehre sei Gott, Thomas Gabriel Ich glaube an Gott, Boltz Gottheit tief verborgen, Ralf Stiewe Heilig, Ruben J. Sturm Lamm Gottes.

On 3 November 2012, he played in the cathedral the organ part of Colin Mawby's Missa solemnis Bonifatius-Messe in the work's second performance by the Chor von St. Bonifatius, conducted by Gabriel Dessauer.

== Recordings ==
- Weihnachtslied – Improvisationen of Darmstädter Glockenspiel
- Orgelmusik des 19. Jahrhunderts an Dreymann-Orgeln in Rheinhessen
- Ehre sei Gott in der Höhe – Weihnachtliche Orgelmusik at the Winterhalter-Orgel of St. Ludwig, Darmstadt
- Duettissimo A 3 – Christina Bockschweiger (soprano), Manfred Bockschweiger (trumpet), Andreas Boltz (organ)
- Mainzer Bistumsmesse - Joint composition of the six regional cantors of the Diocese of Mainz: Dan Zerfass, Nicolo Sokoli, Ruben J. Sturm, Ralf Stiewe, Thomas Gabriel, Andreas Boltz (2010)
- Mainmixtures - Composers in Frankfurt, recorded at the Frankfurt Cathedral (2013)
- Ave Maria - Marianische Orgelmusik, recorded at the Wallfahrtskirche St. Maria in Dieburg (2014)
- Mainstream - Klangströme und Stromklänge, recorded at the Frankfurt Cathedral St. Bartholomew) (2017)
