= Helmut Schlegel =

German Catholic priest (born 1943)

Helmut Schlegel OFM
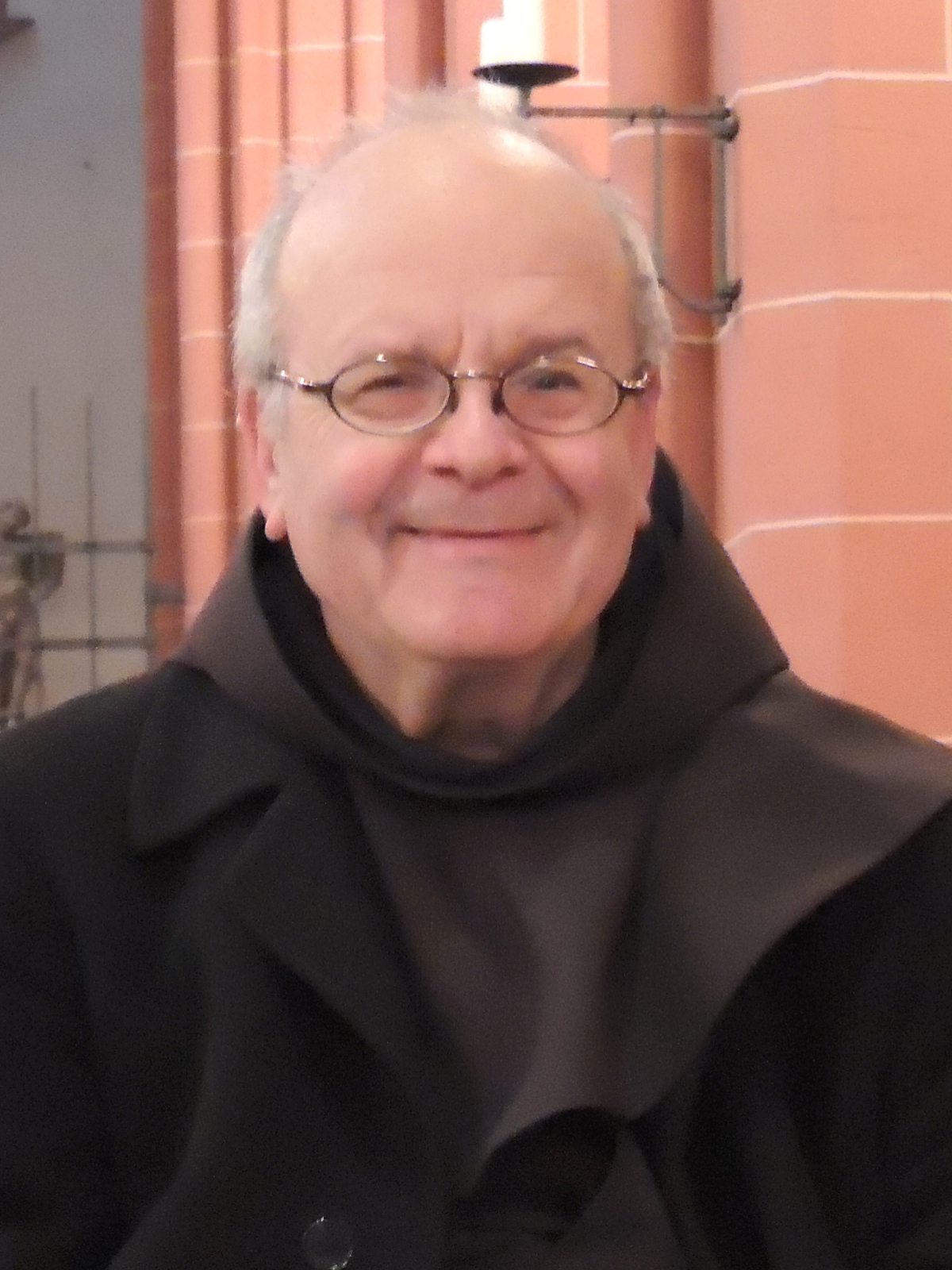
- Schlegel in 2017
- Born: 15 May 1943 (age 83); Riedlingen, Germany
- Occupations: Catholic priest; meditation instructor; author; librettist; song writer
- Website: Official website

Helmut Alfons Schlegel OFM (born 15 May 1943) is a German Franciscan Catholic priest, meditation instructor, author, librettist and songwriter. He is known for writing new spiritual songs (Neues Geistliches Lied), set to music by various composers.

== Career ==
Born Helmut Alfons Schlegel in Riedlingen, he grew up on his parents' farm in Upper Swabia and attended boarding schools of the Franciscans in Riedlingen and in Rottweil. He felt a connection to Francis of Assisi and joined the Franciscan Order. Then he studied philosophy and theology in Monastery Gorheim in Sigmaringen, Monastery Frauenberg in Fulda and Munich and was ordained priest in 1969 in Fulda. An extra-occupational course for meditation and retreat accompanist as well as in meaning-oriented psychology (Logotherapy) complemented his education.

Schlegel worked for ten years in Wiesbaden and in other places as chaplain and as minister for young people (Jugendpfarrer). From 1988 he directed the Franziskanisches Zentrums für Stille und Begegnung (Franciscan centre for silence and meeting) in Hofheim am Taunus. In 1998 he was elected the provincial superior of Thuringian Franciscan province. In this function, he was also for six years the president of the German Franciscan missionaries, organized as Missionszentrale der Franziskaner in Bonn. From 2007 until October 2018, he has directed a centre for Christian meditation and spirituality of the Catholic Diocese of Limburg (Holy Cross – Centre for Christian Meditation and Spirituality (Heilig Kreuz – Zentrum für christliche Meditation und Spiritualität)) at the church Heilig Kreuz in Frankfurt-Bornheim. where worked until June 2019 as a retreat and meditation leader and priestly co-worker. Even after the end of his activity in Bornheim he continues to offer events in the retreat house Hofheim and in cooperation with the Holy Cross – Centre for Christian Meditation and Spirituality.

Schlegel worked also in the diocese's Arbeitskreis Kirchenmusik und Jugendseelsorge im Bistum Limburg, dedicated to new church music for young people. Schlegel wrote the texts for new spiritual songs (Neues Geistliches Lied, NGL), first in collaboration with the composer and church musician Winfried Heurich. Their song "Der Herr wird dich mit seiner Güte segnen" (The Lord will bless you with his goodness), with music by Thomas Gabriel, was acknowledgeded in a worldwide competition in 1983 as the best entry in German. It was included in the Catholic hymnal Gotteslob as GL 452. Schlegel wrote around 300 NGL, with melodies also by Stephan Sahm, Joachim Raabe, Rudolf Schäfer and Sieglinde Weigt, among others.

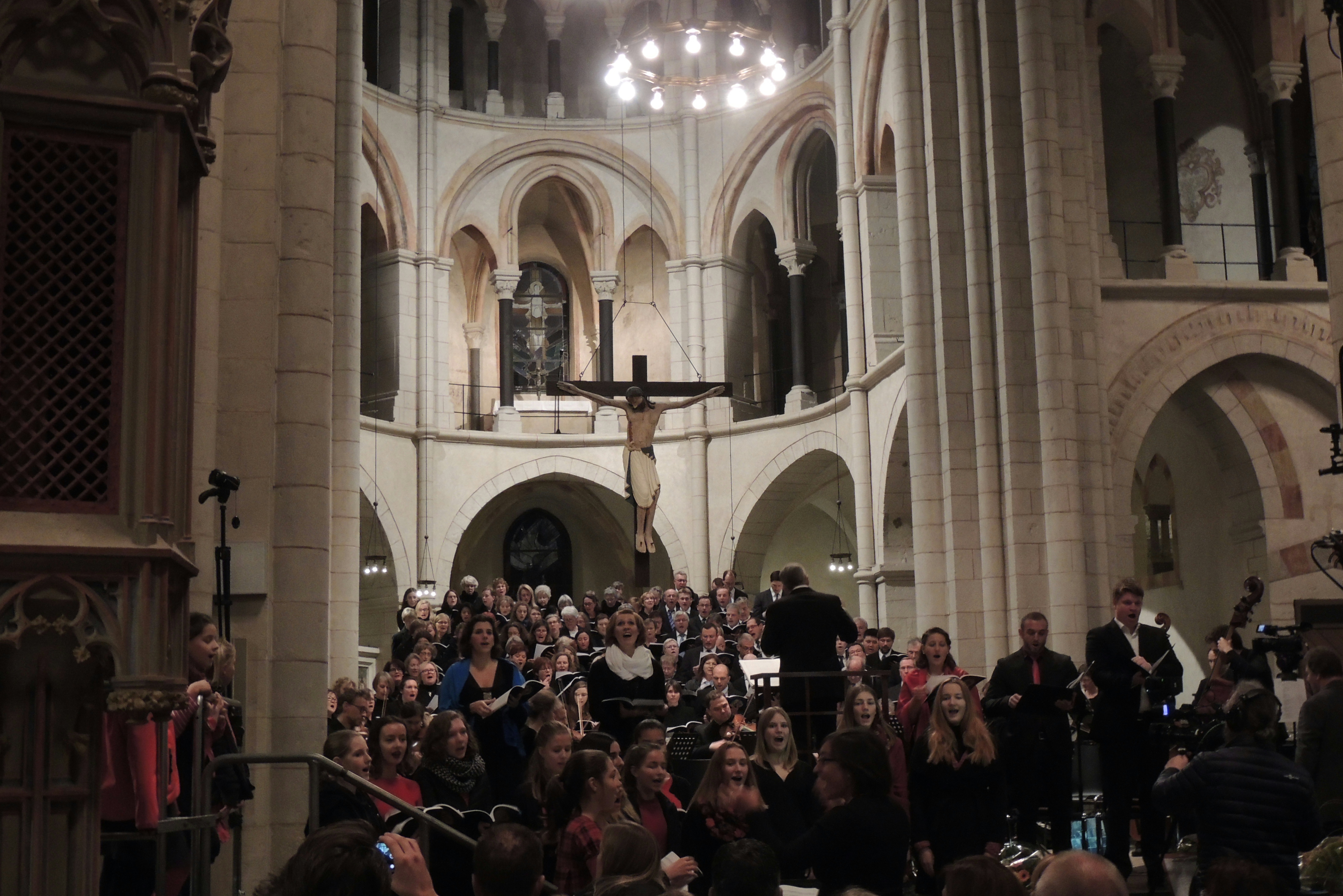
Premiere of Laudato si' on 6 November 2016 at the Limburg Cathedral, conducted by the composer Peter Reulein

He wrote texts for more than 200 hymns, which inspired various composers to write music of the genre Neues Geistliches Lied. Many of the songs appeared in the 2013 Catholic hymnal Gotteslob, some in the common section, others in the Limburg regional section. They also became part of other hymnals and songbooks, such as Junges Gotteslob, the hymnal for young people, the 2013 choral songbook Die Träume hüten (Guarding the dreams), published by Dehm-Verlag, and the Freiburger Kinderchorbuch (children's choir book), commissioned by the Diocese of Freiburg and published by Carus-Verlag.

Schlegel was from 1998 to 2013 the editor of the Franciscan magazines Wege mit Franziskus and Franziskaner. From 2013 he has edited, together with Mirjam Schambeck sf the book series Franziskanische Akzente in the Echter Verlag in Würzburg.

On a commission by the Diocese of Limburg, he wrote the text for an oratorio with music by Peter Reulein, Laudato si' – Ein franziskanisches Magnificat, published by the Dehm-Verlag in 2016. He structured the work, based on the Magnificat in Latin, in a prologue and five scenes; he included texts by Francis of Assisi who began the praises of his Canticle of the Sun with "Laudato si'", Clare of Assisi and Pope Francis who wrote the encyclical Laudato si'.

== Hymns ==
=== List of hymns ===
Several of Schlegel's hymns are part of the Gotteslob (No.).

No.	Title	Composer	Year	Notes
452	Der Herr wird dich mit seiner Güte segnen	Thomas Gabriel	1988	blessing
764	Jesus Christus, Menschensohn	Helmut Föller		Kyrie
843	Ich glaube dir, du Freund des Lebens	Joachim Raabe	2008/2009	Credo
849	Der Herr wird dich mit seiner Güte segnen	Winfried Heurich		blessing
885	Glauben können wie du	Winfried Heurich	2009	Marian song
	Auf zu neuen Horizonten	Stephan Sahm		
	Der Tag bricht an	Johannes Schröder		Magnificat
	Du ewiges Sein	Thomas Gabriel		Psalm 17
	Ein jeder Tag	Peter Reulein	2016	
	Ich kehre zurück	Ricarda Moufang		Nunc dimittis
	Jesus Christus, Menschensohn	Joachim Raabe		Kyrie
	Wenn mein Lebenstag sich neigt	Arndt Büssing		Nunc dimittis

=== Jesus Christus, Menschensohn ===
Schlegel wrote "Jesus Christus, Menschensohn" as a three-fold call to the Jesus, like the liturgical Kyrie, addressed as the Son of man. The first stanza requests enlightenment to see God face to face. The second stanza recalls that Jesus carried on the Cross what we suffer. The third stanza requests that Jesus, called ("gerufen") from grave and death, may be with us on life's steps ("Stufen").

The text was set to music by both Helmut Föller, a church musician responsible for the musical education of priests and pastoral workers at the Sankt Georgen Graduate School of Philosophy and Theology in Frankfurt, as by Joachim Raabe.

=== Der Tag bricht an ===
Schlegel wrote "Der Tag bricht an" (The day will break) as a free paraphrase of the Magnificat. With music by Johannes Schröder, it appeared in the collection for evensong, Auf dem Weg durch diese Nacht, published by Dehm Verlag.

== Other works ==
=== Selected books ===
- Die Zukunft ist ein Samenkorn – Ein Buch zum Lesen, Beten, Meditieren und Singen für junge Leute (in German). Großkrotzenburg: Verlag Bruder Franz. 1991. p. 160. ISBN 3-87163-183-3.
- Helmut Schlegel (1986). Das Rosenkranzgebet: Meditationen, Bilder und Predigten (in German). München: Pfeiffer. p. 160. ISBN 3-7904-0476-4.
- Helmut Schlegel (1989). Fenster in meiner Seele – Geschichten, Gedanken und Gebete auf dem Weg zu mir selbst, zu den Menschen und zu Gott (in German). Limburg: Lahn-Verlag. p. 96. ISBN 3-7840-2674-5.
- Helmut Schlegel (1993). Singen, beten, feiern mit Klara von Assisi: Lieder, Gebete, Meditationen (in German). Werl: Dietrich-Coelde-Verlag. p. 86. ISBN 3-87163-198-1.
- Helmut Schlegel (11 May 2024). Der Sonnengesang: Exerzitien im Alltag mit Franz und Clara von Assisi (in German). Würzburg: Echter Verlag. p. 160. ISBN 978-3-429-02311-9.
- Franziskus bedeutet mir...: persönliche Zeugnisse (in German). Würzburg: Echter Verlag. 2004. p. 79. ISBN 3-429-02621-0.
- Helmut Schlegel (2005). Auszeit im Alltag: Ein geistlicher Wegbegleiter durch das Jahr mit Texten von Franz und Clara von Assisi (in German). Würzburg: Echter Verlag. p. 150. ISBN 3-429-02676-8.
- Helmut Schlegel (2007). Dem Herzen trauen: Mit Elisabeth von Thüringen durch das Jahr; ein geistliches Übungsbuch (in German). Würzburg: Echter Verlag. p. 133. ISBN 978-3-429-02879-4.
- Helmut Schlegel (2007). Spiritual Coaching – Führen und Begleiten auf der Basis geistlicher Grundwerte (in German). Würzburg: Echter Verlag. p. 207. ISBN 978-3-429-02923-4.
- Helmut Schlegel (2008). Ich bin das Feuer, und du bist der Wind: biblische Meditationen zum Werden und Wachsen des inneren Menschen (in German). Kevelaer: Topos plus. p. 112. ISBN 978-3-8367-0663-6.
- Helmut Schlegel (2010). Farben – still leuchtende Gebete: Eine geistliche Begleitung durch den Alltag (in German). Würzburg: Echter Verlag. p. 189. ISBN 978-3-429-03215-9.
- Helmut Schlegel (2013). Assisi für Pilger: Ein spiritueller Reisebegleiter (in German). Würzburg: Echter Verlag. p. 253. ISBN 978-3-429-03586-0.
- Helmut Schlegel und Ricarda Moufang (2012). Heute, nur heute – Zehn Gebote der Gelassenheit von Johannes XXIII. – Geistliche Übungen (in German). Würzburg: Echter Verlag. p. 180. ISBN 978-3-429-03535-8.
- Helmut Schlegel (2014). Die heilende Kraft menschlicher Spannungen. Franziskanische Akzente, vol. 2 (in German). Würzburg: Echter Verlag. p. 79. ISBN 978-3-429-03749-9.
- Helmut Schlegel (2016). Glaubensgeschichten sind Weggeschichten – Die Emmauserzählung als Modell christlicher Existenz (in German). Würzburg: Echter Verlag. p. 88. ISBN 978-3-429-03986-8.

=== Song books, oratorio ===
- Stephan Sahm (music); Winfried Heurich (music); Helmut Schlegel (text) (1994). Pace e bene – Friede und Brot – Neue Geistliche Lieder für Clara und Franz von Assisi (Audio-CD) (in German).
- Sonnenmusikant – Ein Franziskanisches Liederbuch (in German). Werl: Dietrich-Coelde-Verlag. 1999. p. 330. ISBN 3-87163-250-3.
- Winfried Heurich (music); Helmut Schlegel (text). Schalom, Jerusalem: Pilgermesse nach biblischen Texten (in German). München: Friedemann Strube. p. 17 Lieder.
- Winfried Heurich (music); Helmut Schlegel (text). Lichter auf dem Weg: Eine Messe mit neuen geistlichen Liedern; für drei- bis vierstimmigen gemischten Chor, Gemeinde und Klavier (in German). Limburg an der Lahn: Dehm-Verlag. p. 23.
- Winfried Heurich (music); Helmut Schlegel (text). Feuer im Herzen: Eine Messe mit neuen geistlichen Liedern (in German).
- Schlegel, Helmut (2016). Laudato si' / Ein franziskanisches Magnificat. Limburg: Dehm-Verlag. ISBN 978-3-943302-34-9.

=== Texts for sacred musical plays ===
Schlegel wrote the texts for sacred plays with music about the lives of Clare of Assisi and St. Elizabeth.

- music: Winfried Heurich, text: Helmut Schlegel. Franz von Assisi: Traum oder Wirklichkeit? Ein geistliches Musikspiel (in German).
- music: Stephan Sahm, text: Helmut Schlegel. Mulier fortis – Clara von Assisi. Ein geistliches Spiel mit Texten und Liedern, Pantomime und Tanz (in German).
- music: Stephan Sahm, text: Helmut Schlegel. Wächter, sag mir die Zeit! Ein geistliches Musikspiel zur Geschichte der Franziskanerinnen von Reute (in German).
- music: Stephan Sahm, text: Helmut Schlegel. Katharina – Närrin Gottes. Ein Geistliches Musikspiel zum 100. Todestag von Maria Katharina Kasper (in German).
- music: Mea Kauß und Werner Dannemann, text: Helmut Schlegel. clara.francesco – musica per forma – music performance: Eine Collage aus Texten, Musik, Tanz und Ausdruck (in German).
- music: Rudi Schäfer, text: Helmut Schlegel. David Fuchs: Spiel mit dem Leben. Ein geistliches Musiktheater (in German).
- music: Stephan Sahm, text: Helmut Schlegel. Elisabeth von Thüringen: Ein geistliches Musikschauspiel (in German).
