= Der Herr wird dich mit seiner Güte segnen =

- Christian poem and hymn
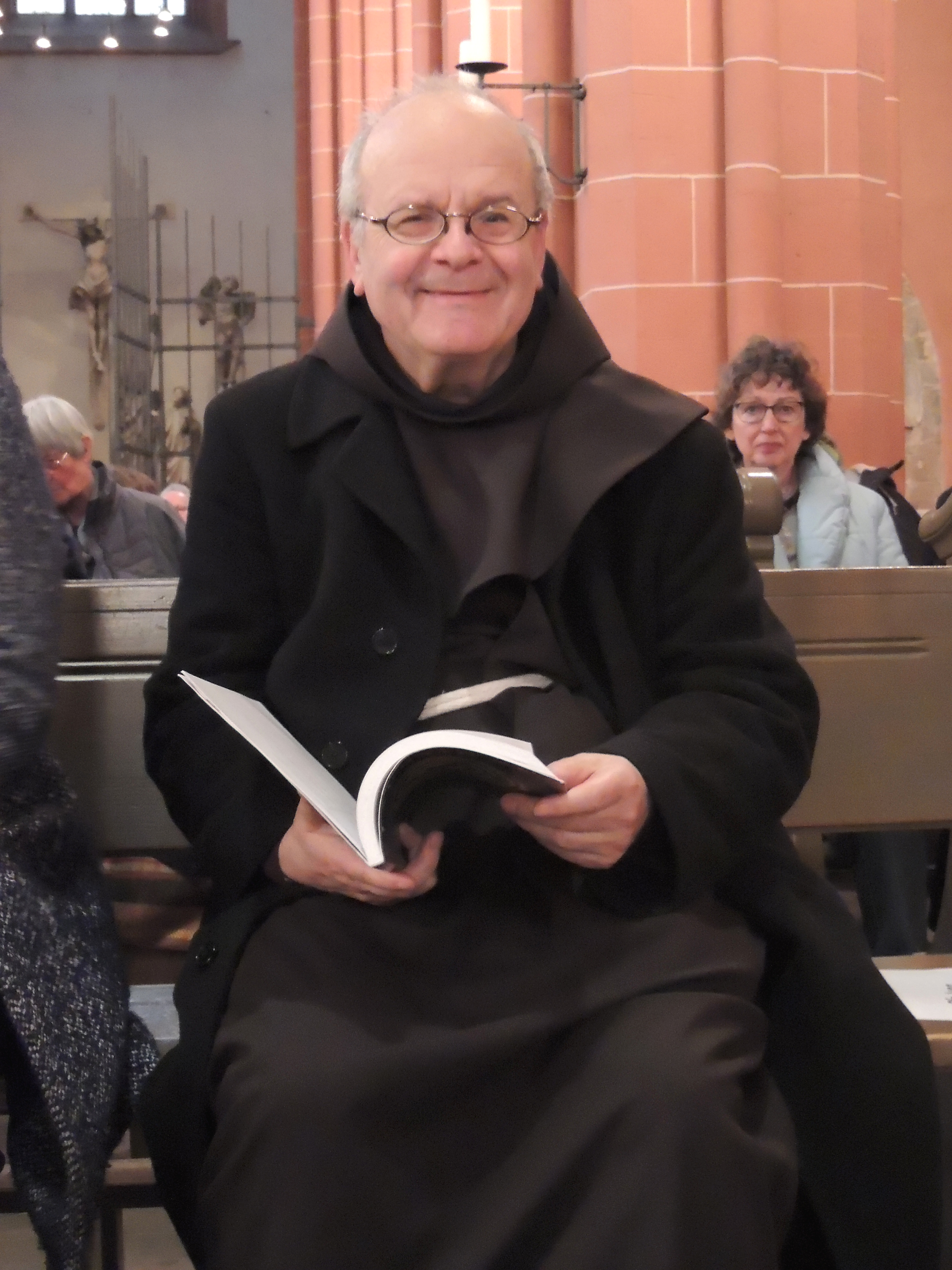
- Helmut Schlegel OFM, in Frankfurt Cathedral 2017
- Text: by Helmut Schlegel
- Language: German
- Melody: by Thomas Gabriel
- Composed: 1998

"Der Herr wird dich mit seiner Güte segnen" (The Lord will bless you with his goodness) is a Christian poem by Helmut Schlegel. It became a hymn of the genre Neues Geistliches Lied with a 1998 melody by Thomas Gabriel, part of the German Catholic hymnal Gotteslob.

== History ==
The text was written by the Franciscan Helmut Schlegel, in seven stanzas and a refrain, both of four lines. It is based on the Priestly Blessing.

The text has been set to music by Thomas Gabriel 1998, and was included in the German common Catholic hymnal Gotteslob as GL 452. With a different melody by Winfried Heurich, it is part of the Gotteslob's regional section for the Diocese of Limburg as GL 849.

On 3 October 1998 the hymn premiered for the Thanksgiving Service for the 25th Anniversary of the Office for Church Music of the Archdiocese of Freiburg in Freiburg Minster.

In the Gotteslob, it is one of the pieces that is demanding both textually and musically.

== Music ==
The hymn does not contain any larger interval jumps besides a few fourths and the melody shows an increase in tension in the verses.
