= Dan Zerfaß =

German classical organist

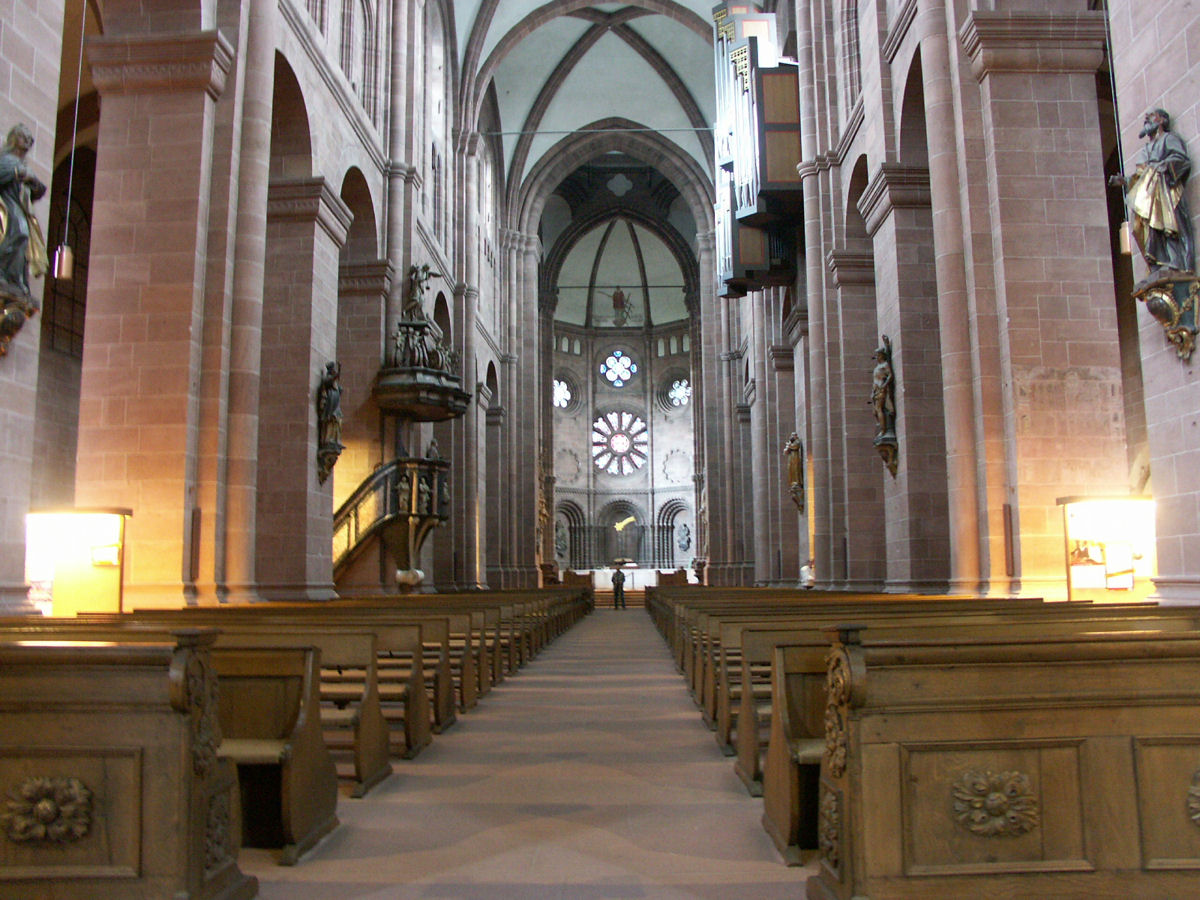
- Worms Cathedral, where the church musician and composer works
- Born: 1968 (age 57–58); Simmern
- Education: Hochschule für Musik Frankfurt
- Occupations: Choral conductor; Organist; Composer; Academic teacher
- Organizations: Worms Cathedral; Hochschule für Musik Mainz; Hochschule für Musik Karlsruhe

Dan Zerfaß (born 1968) is a German classical organist, the cantor at the Worms Cathedral and academic teacher.

== Career ==
Born in Simmern, Zerfaß was a student of Regional cantor Franz Leinhäuser in Oberwesel. He studied at the Hochschule für Musik Frankfurt, finishing in 1992 with top honors as a church musician and graduating in 1993 as a recital organist. Influential teachers were Edgar Krapp (organ), Wolfgang Schäfer (choral and orchestral conducting) and Godehard Joppich (Gregorian chant). He took master classes with Daniel Roth, Wolfgang Rübsam and Guy Bovet (organ), Egidius Doll, Peter Planyavsky and Theo Brandmüller (organ improvisation) and Günther Ludwig (piano).

In 1989, Zerfaß became cantor at St. Albert in Frankfurt and in 1996 the regional cantor at St. Bonifatius in Bad Nauheim. Since 1999, he has been the cantor at the cathedral St. Peter in Worms. From 1993 to 1997 he taught liturgical organ playing at the Hochschule für Musik Karlsruhe and is supervising an organ literature class at the Hochschule für Musik Mainz of Johannes Gutenberg University in Mainz. He is also as an organ expert of the Diocese of Mainz and works in the artistic direction of the Internationale Orgelfestwochen (International organ weeks) of the festival Kultursommer Rheinland-Pfalz (Cultural Summer of Rhineland-Palatinate).

As a composer, he participated in the project Mainzer Bistumsmesse (Mass of the Diocese of Mainz), a collaboration of six regional cantors to create a mass in German for choir, a high voice (children's choir or soprano) and organ. He composed Herr, erbarme dich, Nicolo Sokoli Ehre sei Gott, Thomas Gabriel Ich glaube an Gott, Andreas Boltz Gottheit tief verborgen, Ralf Stiewe Heilig, Ruben J. Sturm Lamm Gottes.

He recorded the complete organ works by Robert Schumann and works by Petr Eben, among others.
