= Auf zu neuen Horizonten =

Catholic hymn (2009)

- Christian poem and hymn
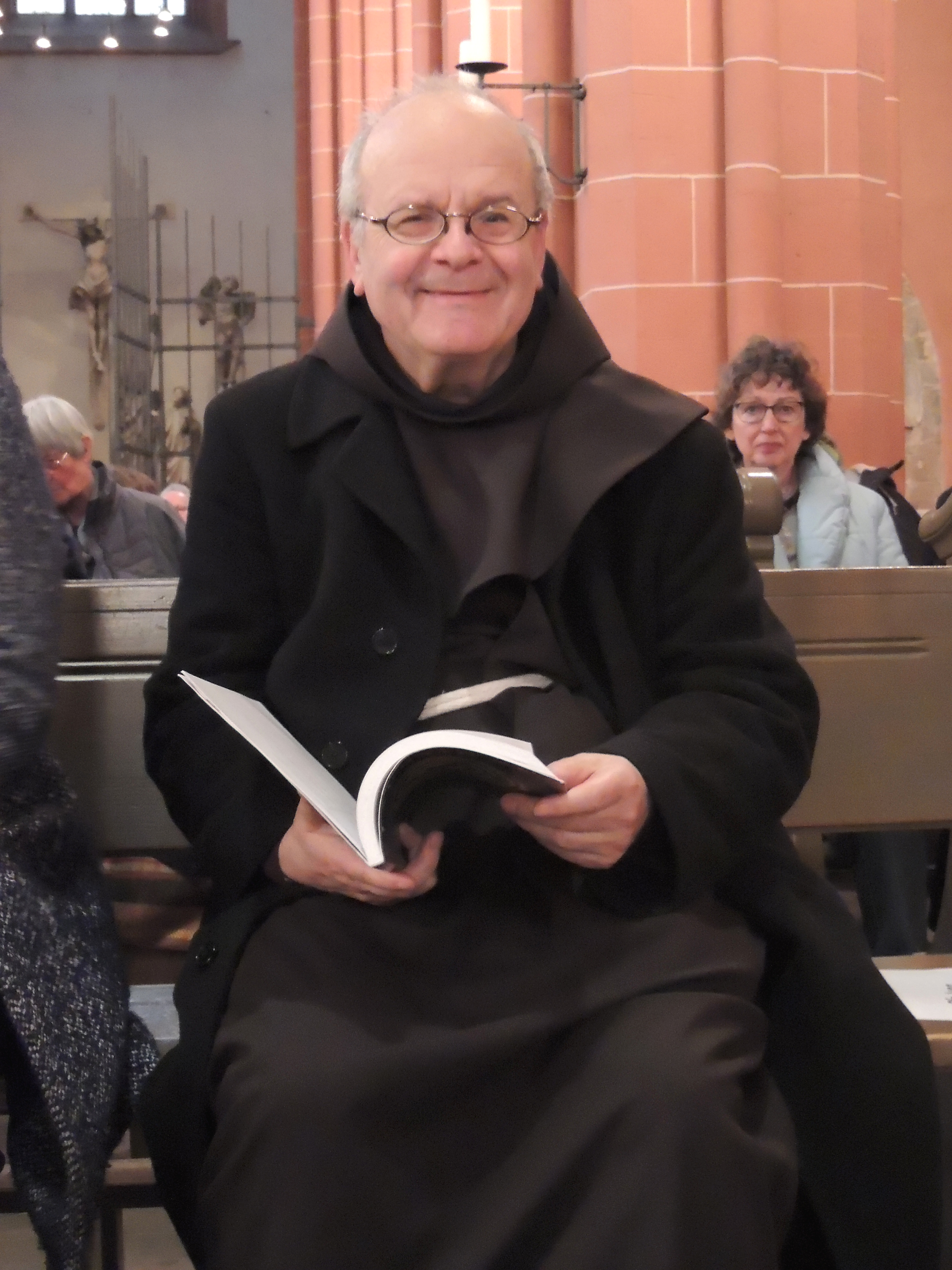
- Helmut Schlegel OFM, in Frankfurt Cathedral 2017
- English: On to new horizons
- Text: by Helmut Schlegel
- Language: German
- Melody: by Stephan Sahm

"Auf zu neuen Horizonten" (On to new horizons) is a Christian hymn with text by Helmut Schlegel, and music by Stephan Sahm. It is of the genre Neues Geistliches Lied. The song is included in the Catholic hymnal for young people, Ein Segen sein, and other songbooks.

== History ==
The text of "Auf zu neuen Horizonten" was written by the Franciscan Helmut Schlegel for the opening of a mass of an international youth pilgrimage to Vézelay in Burgundy. It is in five stanzas with a refrain.

The melody was created by Stephan Sahm. The hymn appears in the Catholic hymnal for young people, Ein Segen sein (Be a blessing), and in the songbook for choir and band, Die Träume hüten (Guarding the dreams), published by the Dehm-Verlag.
