= Madern Gerthener =

German stonemason and architect

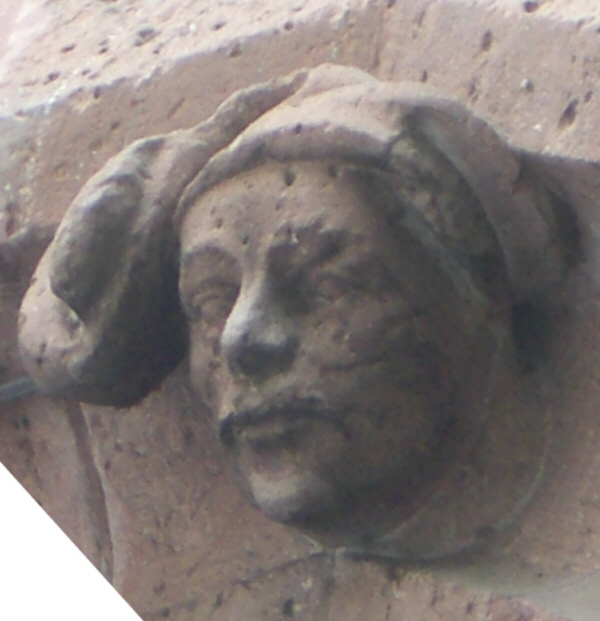
Sculptural self-portrait from the Eschenheim Gate in Frankfurt

Madern Gerthener (1360/1370 – 1430) was a German stonemason and late Gothic architect.

== Biography ==
Gerthener was born in Frankfurt to Johann Gerthener, a stonemason whose business the younger Gerthener took over by 1391. In 1395 he entered the city payroll, and soon took a leading role in the city's large construction works. One of his earlier works was involvement in building the Alte Brücke (Old Bridge) over the Main in 1399, and, although his role in only a few other works is directly attested, he was probably involved in a number of other projects around Frankfurt as its Werkmeister, including the city walls and town hall.

Of high architecture, the largest portion of his career in Frankfurt was spent on the Frankfurt Cathedral, whose works he was appointed to oversee in 1408. Of note here are the Cathedral's single tower, which Gerthener designed and began building in 1415, and which would become a symbol of Frankfurt's independence; and innovative use of hanging and vaulted tracery forms on the cathedral's portals that would become a characteristic of his style. He may have also been responsible for the tympanum above the south portal of the Liebfrauenkirche in Frankfurt, depicting a scene of the Adoration of the Magi.

By the 1410s his services were in enough demand that he worked on a number of projects outside Frankfurt as well, though most are only attributed to Gerthener based on style. The most important and confidently attributed of these are the portal to the Memorial Chapel of the Mainz Cathedral, dated to around 1425, which also includes several sculptures attributed to him, partly on the basis of payment records indicating he had at least occasionally worked as a sculptor.

== Legacy ==
Contrary to the theses of Johann Josef Böker, the extensive documentary evidence and detailed stylistic studies indicate that Madern Gerthener was the most significant artist of the Late Gothic period in the Middle Rhine region. His innovative formal language—including rod tracery and arch ribs—introduced a new dynamism into architectural structures and distinguished him from other “star architects” of around 1400.

His principal work, the Frankfurt Cathedral tower, combines—much like his sculptural pieces—a plastic treatment of the architectural body with a vivid, almost pictorial expressiveness. The breadth of his output as both architect and sculptor has led some scholars to consider whether his activity should be viewed as part of a collaborative workshop model involving sculptors and stonemasons. Although documents mention several foremen, these figures did not hold independent responsibility for major projects. The extensive documentary record in Frankfurt, however, is difficult to reconcile with such an early modern framework.

At the Memorial Gate of Mainz Cathedral and the portal of Frankfurt’s Church of Our Lady, Gerthener is known to have collaborated with a Mainz sculptor first documented at the tomb of Anna von Dalberg († 1420) in the Church of St. Catherine in Oppenheim. In other cases, preparatory work by his apprentices can be assumed. As demonstrated by Friedhelm Wilhelm Fischer, Gerthener’s architectural style was highly influential throughout the Middle Rhine region and remained a model well into the late 15th century. His influence as a sculptor was less pronounced, as he worked in competition and exchange with artists from Mainz.
