= Bruder Martin =

Oratorio

- Oratorio by Thomas Gabriel
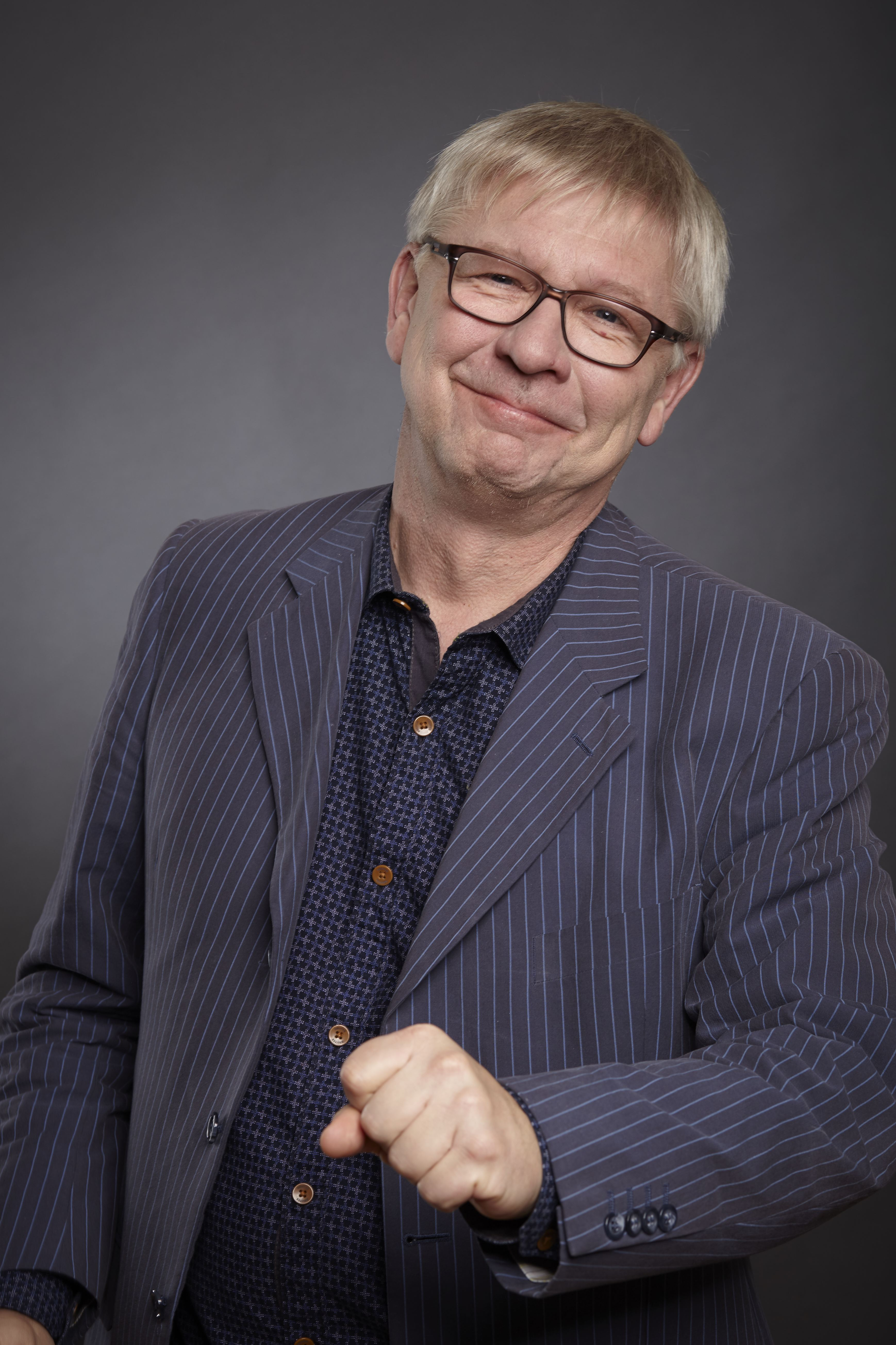
- Thomas Gabriel in 2015
- Text: Eugen Eckert
- Language: German
- Based on: Life of Martin Luther
- Performed: 17 September 2017
- Published: 2017 Strube Verlag

Bruder Martin is an oratorio composed by Thomas Gabriel to a libretto in German by Eugen Eckert. The work in seven scenes and a prologue is based on the life of Martin Luther. It was written for the 500th anniversary of the Reformation in 2017. The composition is set for narrator, soloists, mixed choir, band and orchestra, and includes both Luther hymns and pop ballads. Bruder Martin was premiered open air in Tecklenburg on 17 September 2017, with the performers dressed in period costumes. It was published by Strube Verlag.

== History ==
The oratorio Bruder Martin was commissioned in 2014 for the regional Kirchentag of the districts Tecklenburg, Steinfurt-Coesfeld-Borken and Münster of the Protestant Church, to celebrate 500 years after Reformation, in 2017. The team of the Protestant pastor Eugen Eckert for the text and the Catholic church musician Thomas Gabriel for the music, who had collaborated on oratorios before, began in November 2014 to realize the ecumenical project.

The preparations and rehearsals of many groups including lay singers took more than a year, culminating in two rehearsals for the complete cast. The premiere was performed on 17 September 2017 on the open-air stage at a castle ruin in Tecklenburg, which seats 2,300 people. Both authors attended the performance. The premiere was conducted by Kirchenmusikdirektor Martin Ufermann from Westerkappeln. The narrator was Alfred Buß, formerly Präses of the Evangelische Kirche von Westfalen. The choir was formed by around 300 singers. The performers were dressed in costumes of the Reformation period which some made themselves.

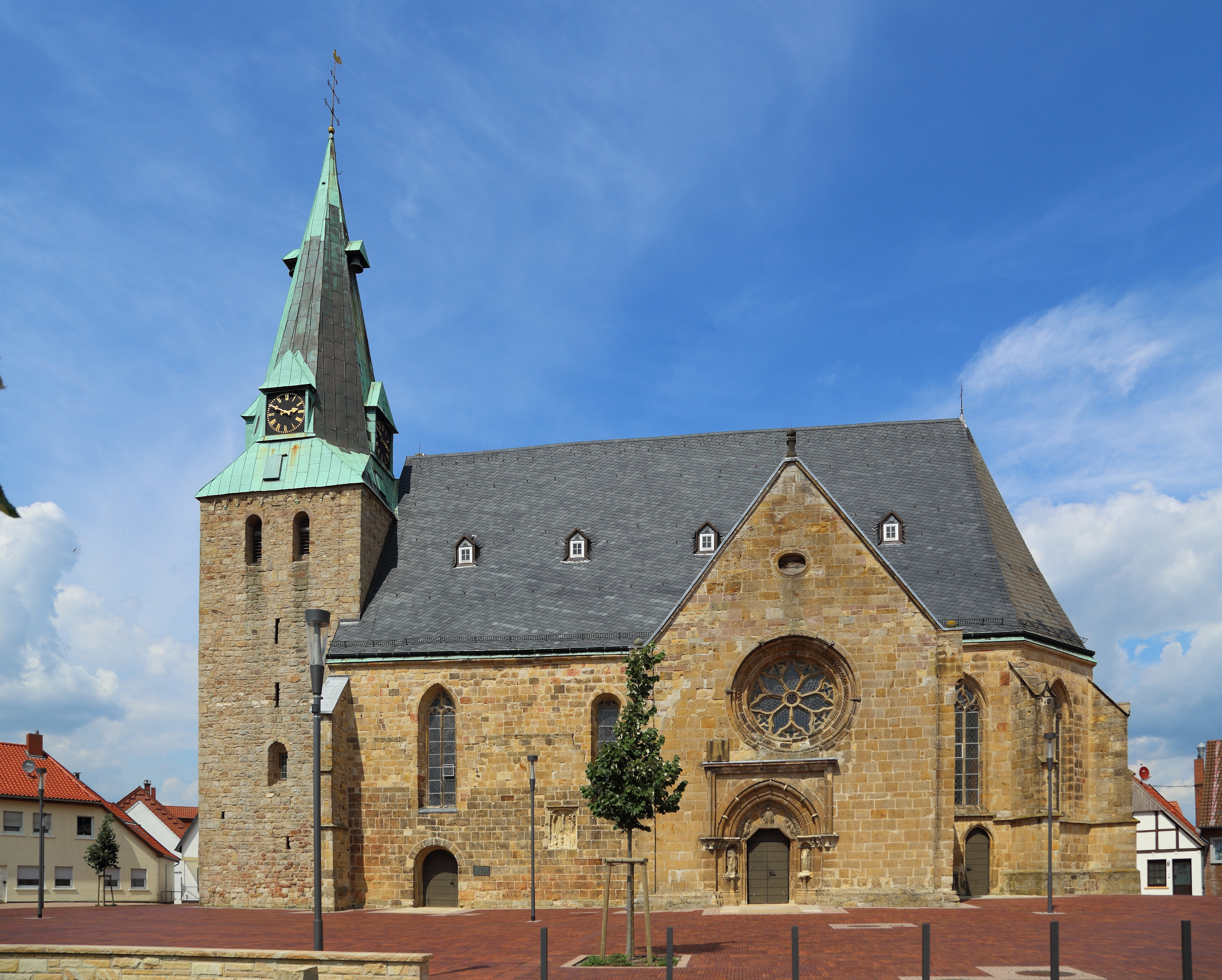
Stadtkirche Westerkappeln

Two more performances were held at the Stadtkirche Westerkappeln, with 180 choir singers of Junger Chor and Kantorei from Westerkappeln and the Ki-Pop-Chor from Mettingen, the Orchester Musica Viva from Ibbenbüren and the Luther-Rockband.

Bruder Martin was played again in Seligenstadt in October 2017. The oratorio was published by Strube Verlag.

== Composition ==
Bruder Martin is structured in seven scenes and a prologue. Episodes from the life of Martin Luther are presented in chronological order, with a focus on his intention to reform the church, not to split it. The scenes deal with his hopes, doubt and conflicts, and both his supporters and adversaries appear. The composition is set for a narrator, 23 soloists, mixed choir, a band, and an orchestra. The music includes stanzas from Luther's hymns, pop ballads, rap, and "groovy" choral scenes. A performance takes about two and a half hours.
