= Hans Abel =

Painter from Frankfurt, Germany

Hans Abel, a painter from Frankfurt, who lived around 1494, is believed to have painted some of the windows which adorn the Frankfurt Cathedral and several churches in that city. He also painted banners and coats of arms.
