= Missionszentrale der Franziskaner =

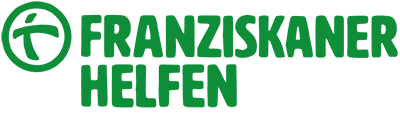
- Abbreviation: MZF
- Motto: Für die Würde des Menschen. Weltweit.
- Types: Franciscan development charity
- Legal status: Registered association
- Headquarters: Bonn
- Country: Germany
- Membership: 7 (2022, 2023)
- Chairpersons: Matthias Maier
- Revenue: 22,230,808.47 (2024)
- Total Assets: 25,524,252.77 (2023)
- Employees: 28 (2019)
- Volunteers: 8 (2018)
- Awards: DZI Seal-of-Approval
- Website: franziskaner-helfen.de

The Missionszentrale der Franziskaner (MZF, Franciscan mission centre) is a German development charity association of the Franciscan order, based in Bonn-Bad Godesberg and operating in many countries. It is focused on development of humanitarian, social and pastoral projects, and on education, information and human rights.

== History ==
The Second Vatican Council inspired German Franciscans to found in 1969 a charity organisation which follows Francis of Assisi: supporting and representing the poor. The founding director was Andreas Müller, who led the organisation until 2002. It runs projects in Afrika, Asia, Oceania, Latin America as well as in Eastern Europe. In 2003, the MZF initiated the Bank für Orden und Mission (Bank for orders and mission)

== Work ==
The Missionszentrale der Franziskaner follows the principles of Francis of Assisi of solidarity with the poor and protection of the environment. It is dedicated to the option for the poor. More than 220.000 Franciscans are active in around 110 countries, living and working with people in need.n The MZF supports around 600 projects in 60 countries. They are chosen by criteria:

- initiated by the people in need
- socially and environmentally sustainable
- helping people to help themselves ("Hilfe zur Selbsthilfe")

The MZF organises seminars and issues publications such as the quarterly Grüne Reihe. From 1999, the MZF organized a voluntary year ("Freiwilligenjahr") for young adults, who work in projects. From 2009, the MZF has organised travels to enable meetings of people of different cultures and religions.
