= Guy Bovet =

Swiss organist and composer

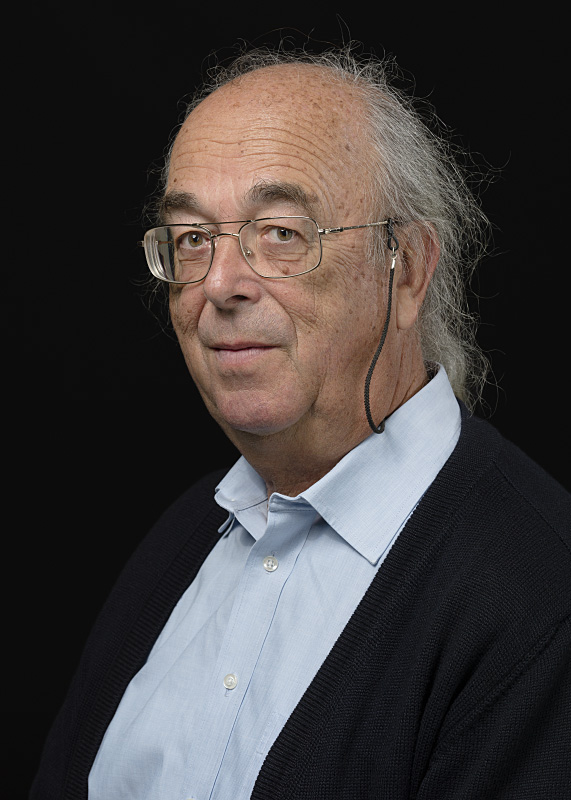

Guy Bovet (born 22 May 1942 in Thun) is a Swiss organist and composer.

== Career ==
Bovet studied under Marie Dufour in Lausanne, Pierre Segond in Geneva and Marie-Claire Alain in Paris. From 1979 to 1999 he taught Spanish organ music at the University of Salamanca, and since 1989 he has been Professor of Organ at the Musikhochschule in Basel, Switzerland. He has also been a visiting professor or taught masterclasses at numerous conservatories and institutions in Europe and North America, has authored some 1,400 published papers on the history of the organ, composed several works for organ and other instruments, and released over 50 recordings.

He is a noted scholar of historical organs and has advised on the restoration of historical instruments.

He has also served as judge in important music competitions including the St Albans International Organ Festival.
