= Thomas Gabriel (composer) =

German musician and composer

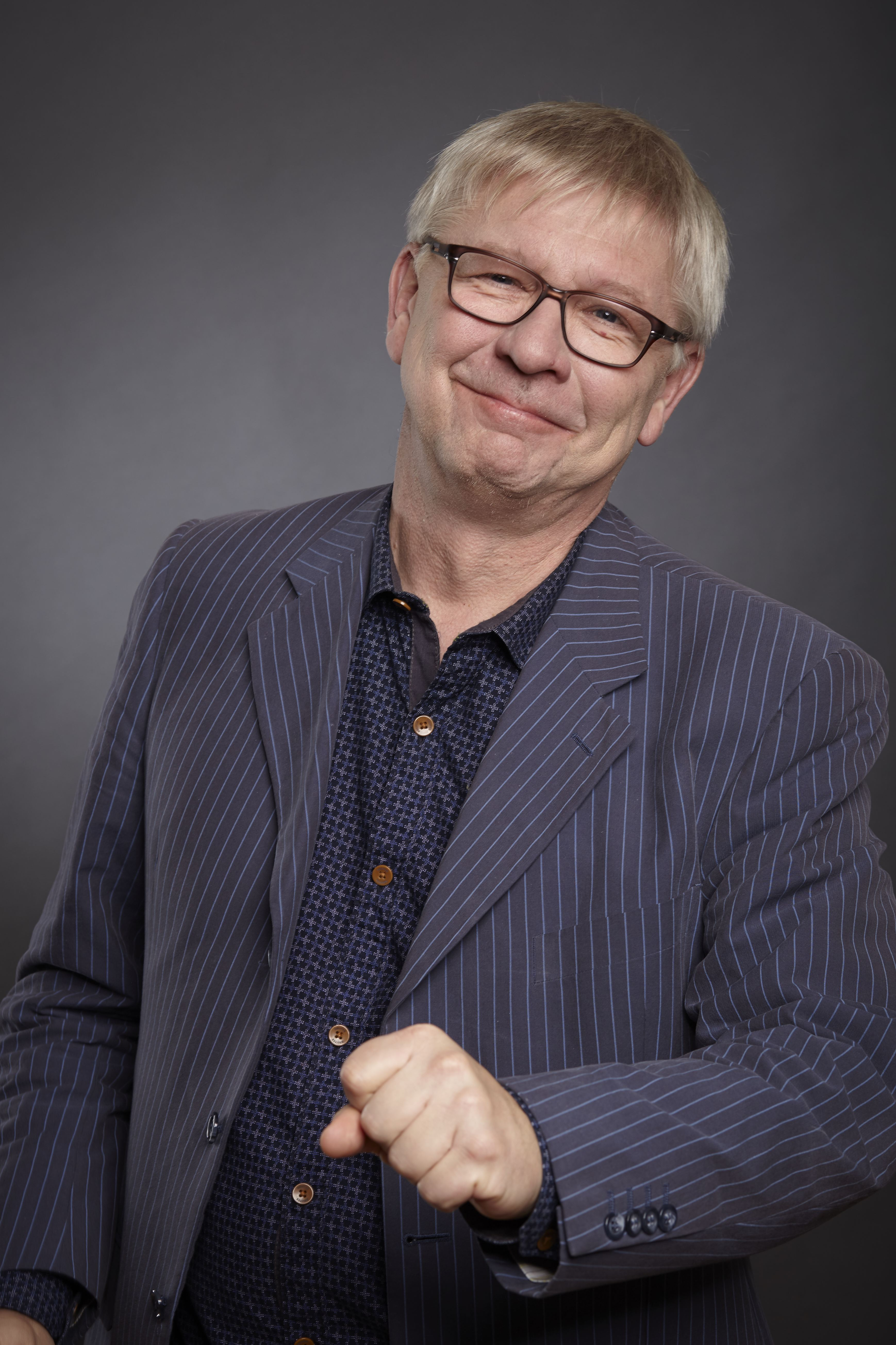
- The composer in 2015
- Born: 25 August 1957 (age 69); Essen, West Germany
- Education: Folkwang Hochschule
- Occupations: Cantor; Composer; Arranger

Thomas Gabriel (born 25 August 1957) is a German church musician, composer and arranger.

== Career ==
Born in Essen, Gabriel studied Catholic church music at the Folkwang Hochschule, organ with Sieglinde Ahrens and Josef Bucher. From 1983 to 1986 he served as cantor at the Liebfrauenkirche in Recklinghausen. He worked freelance from 1987 to 1988 for the West German Radio and the Ruhrfestspiele in Recklinghausen. From 1989 to 1991 he was district cantor at St. Martin, Idstein, where he founded a youth choir called Martinis in 1988. From 1992 to 1997 he was regional cantor in Saarbrücken. Since 1998, he has been cantor for the Regional Institute of Sacred Music in the Diocese of Mainz with a focus on Neues Geistliches Lied (NGL, New sacred song), for the deaneries Offenbach, Rodgau and Seligenstadt, at the church St. Marcellinus und Petrus).

Gabriel gives many concerts as an organist, harpsichordist and pianist, particularly as a member of the Thomas Gabriel Trio, whose artistic focus is on jazz arrangements of the music of Johann Sebastian Bach.

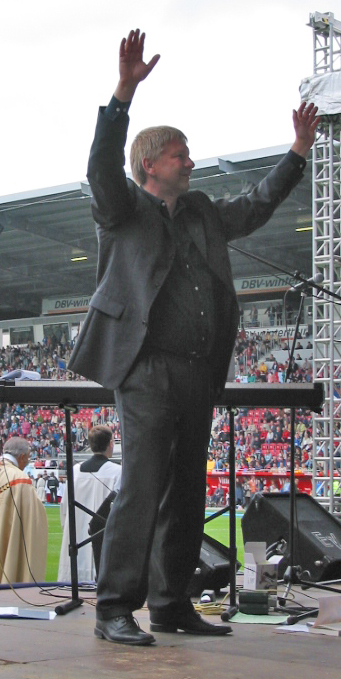
The final service Tage der Begegnung, 15 August 2005, Bruchwegstadion, Mainz

As a composer, Gabriel tries to combine traditional church music with elements from jazz and pop. He composed in 2005 Missa mundi (Mass of the world) for the final mass of the World Youth Day in Cologne on 21 August 2005, representing five continents in style and instrumentation: a European Kyrie influenced by the style of Bach, a South American Gloria with guitars and pan flutes, an Asian Credo with sitar, an African Sanctus with drums, and an Australian Agnus Dei with didgeridoos. It was premiered by a project choir from the Würzburg Cathedral, conducted by Martin Berger, with Gabriel at the keyboard. He participated in the project Mainzer Bistumsmesse (Mass of the Diocese of Mainz), a collaboration of six regional cantors to create a mass in German for choir, a high voice (children's choir or soprano) and organ. Dan Zerfaß composed Herr, erbarme dich, Nicolo Sokoli Ehre sei Gott, Thomas Gabriel Ich glaube an Gott, Andreas Boltz Gottheit tief verborgen, Ralf Stiewe Heilig, and Ruben J. Sturm Lamm Gottes.

== Compositions ==
- Daniel, rock oratorio
- Mainzer Messe (Mainz Mass), for three-part mixed choir, keyboard (organ, piano) and brass (trumpet, saxophon, trombone), text by Raymund Weber
- Frau Holle, musical
- 1999: Martin in Mainhattan (Martin in Mainhattan – nickname of Frankfurt), musical
- 2002: Emmaus, oratorio, text by Eugen Eckert
- Misa de Solidaridad for solo, four-part mixed choir and instruments, a mass of solidarity with Bolivia
- 2003: compositions for the opening service of the Ökumenischer Kirchentag at the Brandenburger Tor in Berlin
- compositions for the closing service of the 95th Katholikentag in Ulm
- 2004: Bonifatius, oratorio, text by Barbara Nichtweiß
- 2005: Missa mundi (Mass of the world), final mass of the World Youth Day on 21 August 2005
- 2006: Der Sonne entgegen (Towards the sun), musical on the life of Saint Edith Stein, including texts by students of the Edith-Stein-Schule Darmstadt
- 2006: Kreuzweg, oratorio
- 2010: Junia, oratorio, text by Eckert
- 2017: Bruder Martin, oratorio, text by Eckert
