= Frankfurt Cathedral =

- Imperial Dom of Saint Bartholomew
- Kaiserdom Sankt Bartholomäus
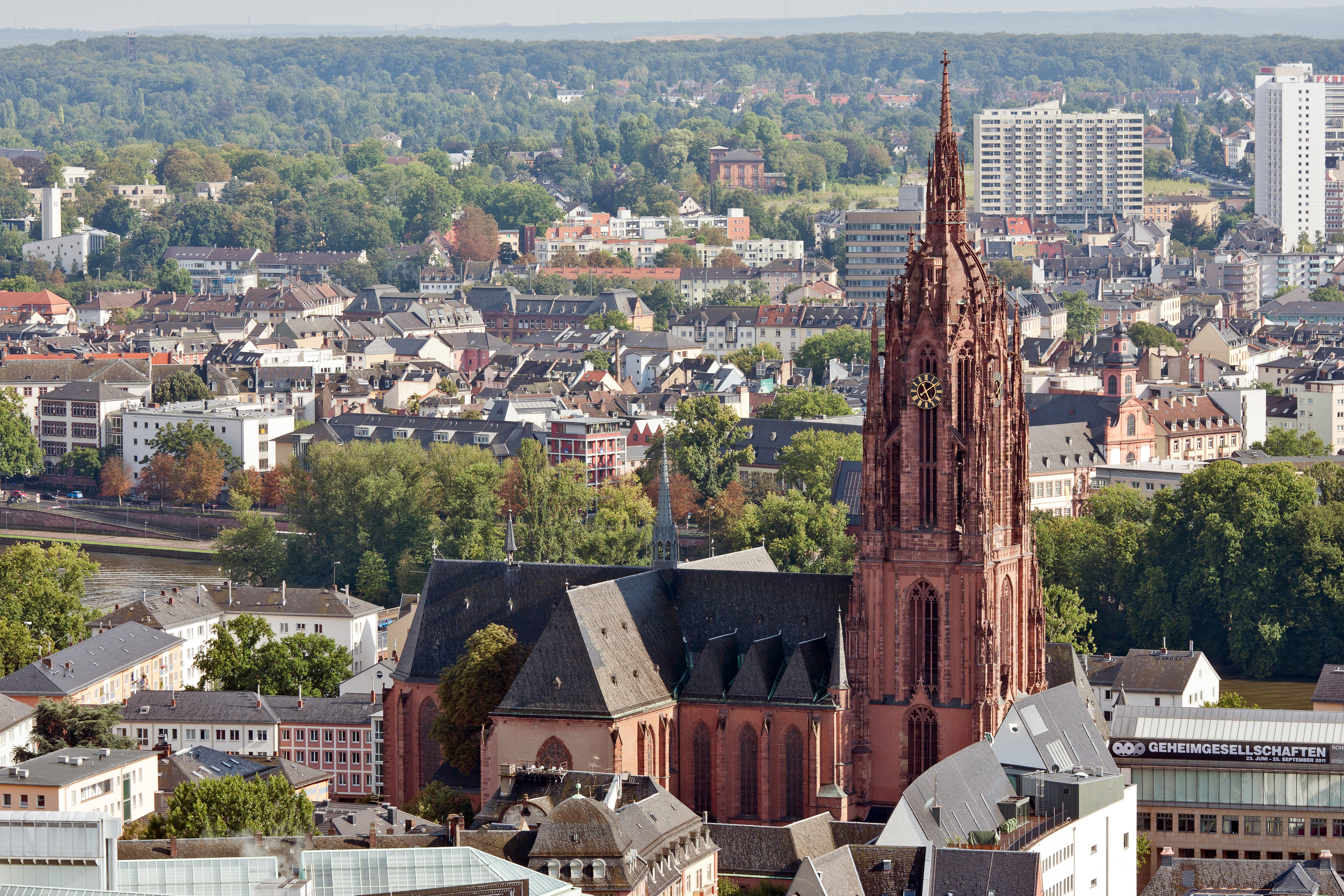
- Frankfurt Cathedral
- 50°6′38″N 8°41′6″E
- Location: Domplatz 1 Frankfurt am Main
- Country: Germany
- Denomination: Roman Catholic
- Website: www.dom-frankfurt.de

History
- Status: Cathedral (also parish church)
- Dedication: Bartholomew the Apostle

Architecture
- Functional status: Active
- Style: Gothic
- Years built: c. 7th century (original building)
- Completed: 1550; 1990s (restoration)

Administration
- Province: Cologne
- Diocese: Limburg

Frankfurt Cathedral (German: Frankfurter Dom), officially Imperial Dome of Saint Bartholomew (German: Kaiserdom Sankt Bartholomäus), is a Roman Catholic Gothic church located in the heart of Frankfurt am Main, Germany. It is dedicated to Saint Bartholomew.

It is the largest religious building in the city and a former collegiate church. Despite its common English name, it has never been an actual cathedral (episcopal see). (Note: The diocesan cathedral is in Limburg.) Still, it is called the Kaiserdom (an "imperial great church" or imperial cathedral) or simply the Dom because of its importance as former election and coronation church of the Holy Roman Empire. Dom (as the Italian Duomo) denotes the main church of a town or a city, which may not be a cathedral. As one of the significant buildings of the Empire's history, it was a symbol of national unity, especially in the 19th century.

== History ==
Frankfurt Cathedral was an imperial collegiate church, termed Dom in German—a synecdoche for all collegiate churches used totum pro parte also for cathedrals—and thus traditionally translated as cathedral in English, though Frankfurt has never been a bishop's seat. St. Bartholomew's is the main church of Frankfurt and was constructed in the 14th and 15th centuries on the foundation of an earlier church from the Merovingian time.

This earlier church which stood on the site of today's cathedral, the Salvator Basilica of the Frankfurt Königspfalz (Royal Palace), was originally founded on 1 September 852 by the East Franconian King Louis the German and consecrated by the Archbishop of Mainz Rabanus Maurus. The palace itself (of which the foundations can be seen next to the cathedral as an excavation site) was created at the beginning of the 9th century under Louis the Pious, the son of Charlemagne, and replaced a royal court of the Merovingians of the 7th century, who in turn had conquered the area around Frankfurt am Main from the Alemanni.

From the 11th century onwards, the royal Pfalz lost its importance as an itinerary residence of the German kings. It was only in the Hohenstaufen period, around the middle of the 12th century, under Conrad III, that the pfalz was again used for Hoftage (gatherings of the mighty of the Empire). Soon afterwards the palace was given up and replaced by houses of city residents who used its thick walls for cellars, but the Palace Church was gradually replaced by the Gothic cathedral. The Stift that owned the church was first called Salvatorstift, later Bartholomäusstift. This community of canons was the host of the cathedral for almost 1,000 years from its foundation in 852 until secularization in 1803.

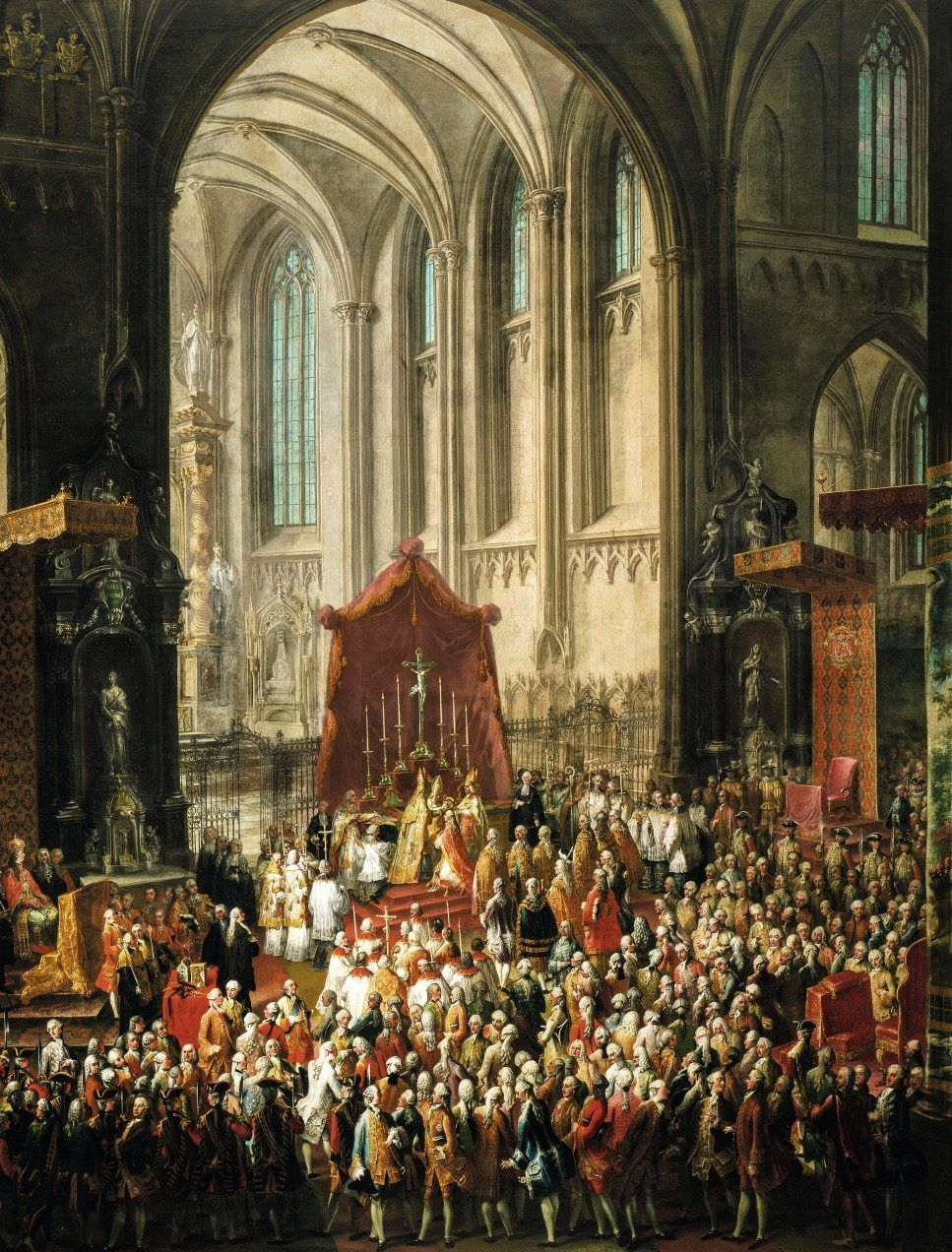
Coronation of Archduke Joseph as King of the Romans in Frankfurt Cathedral, 3 April 1764

Since 1356, when the Golden Bull of 1356 was issued by Charles IV, Holy Roman Emperor, emperors of the Holy Roman Empire were elected in this collegiate church as Kings of the Romans (see: List of royal and imperial elections in the Holy Roman Empire), and from 1562 to 1792, emperors-elect were crowned here. The imperial elections were held in the Wahlkapelle, a chapel on the south side of the choir (Hochchor) built for this purpose in 1425 (see the plan below) and the anointing and crowning of the emperors-elect as King of the Romans took place before the central altar–believed to enshrine part of the head of St. Bartholomew—in the crossing of the church, at the entrance to the choir (See the Plan to the right).

When the city of Frankfurt secularized, it appropriated the remaining Catholic churches and their endowments of earning assets, however, leaving the usage of the church buildings to the existing Catholic parishes. Thus, St. Bartholomew's became the city's dotation churches, owned and maintained by the city but used by Catholic or Lutheran congregations.

In 1867, St. Bartholomew's was destroyed by a fire and rebuilt in its present style. During World War II, between October 1943 and March 1944, the old town of Frankfurt, the biggest old Gothic town in Central Europe, was devastated by six bombardments of the Allied Air Forces. The most significant losses occurred in an attack by the Royal Air Force on 22 March 1944, when more than a thousand buildings of the old town, most of them half-timbered houses, were destroyed.

St. Bartholomew's suffered severe damage. The interior was burned out completely. The building was reconstructed in the 1950s. The height of the spire is 95 meters (312 ft).

== Bells ==
The cathedral contains nine bells hung in the tower, two of which are bourdon bells. They are all cast by Hermann Große in Dresden in 1877. The total weight of the bells is 23,384.5 kg. Four of the bells are used to strike the clock : the quarter-hour strike is given by Bells 9 and 7), the full hour strike is given by bells 4 and 3. In Germany, the bells are always numbered from largest to smallest, Bell 1 is always the tenor or bourdon.

Bell Number	Name German	Name (English)	Weight (kg)	Diameter (mm)
1	Gloriosa (Bourdon Bell)		11,950	2,585
2	Carolus (2nd Bourdon Bell)		4,630	1,924
3	Bartholomäus	Bartholomew	2,380	1,547
4	Salveglocke	Salve Bell	1,520	1,291
5	Mettenglocke	Midnight bell	984	1,147
6	Kleine Uhrglocke	Small Clock Bell	690	1,020
7	Johannes		552	946
8	Zeitglocke	Time bell	403	851
9	Kleinste Glocke	Smallest bell	276	752

== Frankfurt Cathedral Choir School ==
The Frankfurt Cathedral Choir School (German: Frankfurter Domsingschule), founded in 2011, is a mixed ecumenical children's and youth choir, which accompanies not only mass and evensongs, but also official receptions and openings. The Frankfurter Domsingschule offers any singer, regardless of their religious affiliation, age-based, free vocal basic training at regular rehearsals and valuable one-on-one and group vocal training or early musical education. This extensive basic training is unique for Frankfurt.

== Notable people associated with the cathedral ==
- Conrad III of Dhaun, former provost
- Madern Gerthener, stonemason and architect who designed the cathedral
- Johannes Jeep, organist
- Joseph Weyland, Bishop of Fulda
- Hans Abel, artist contributing to the stained glass

Notable burials

- Johannes Karl von und zu Franckenstein, Prince-Bishop of Worms
- Günther von Schwarzburg, anti-king and member of the House of Schwarzburg

== Gallery ==
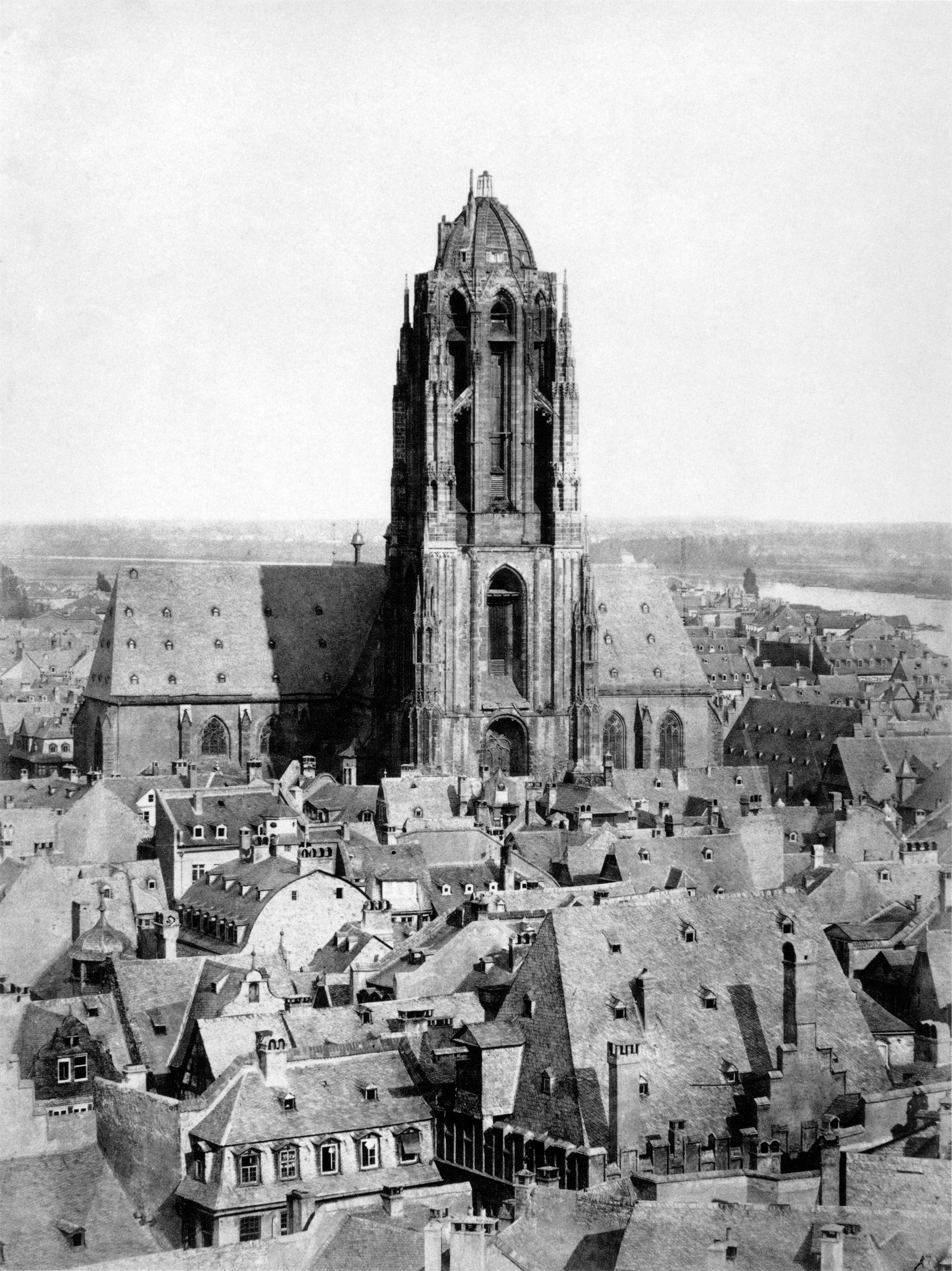
The Cathedral as seen from St. Paul's Church, 1866

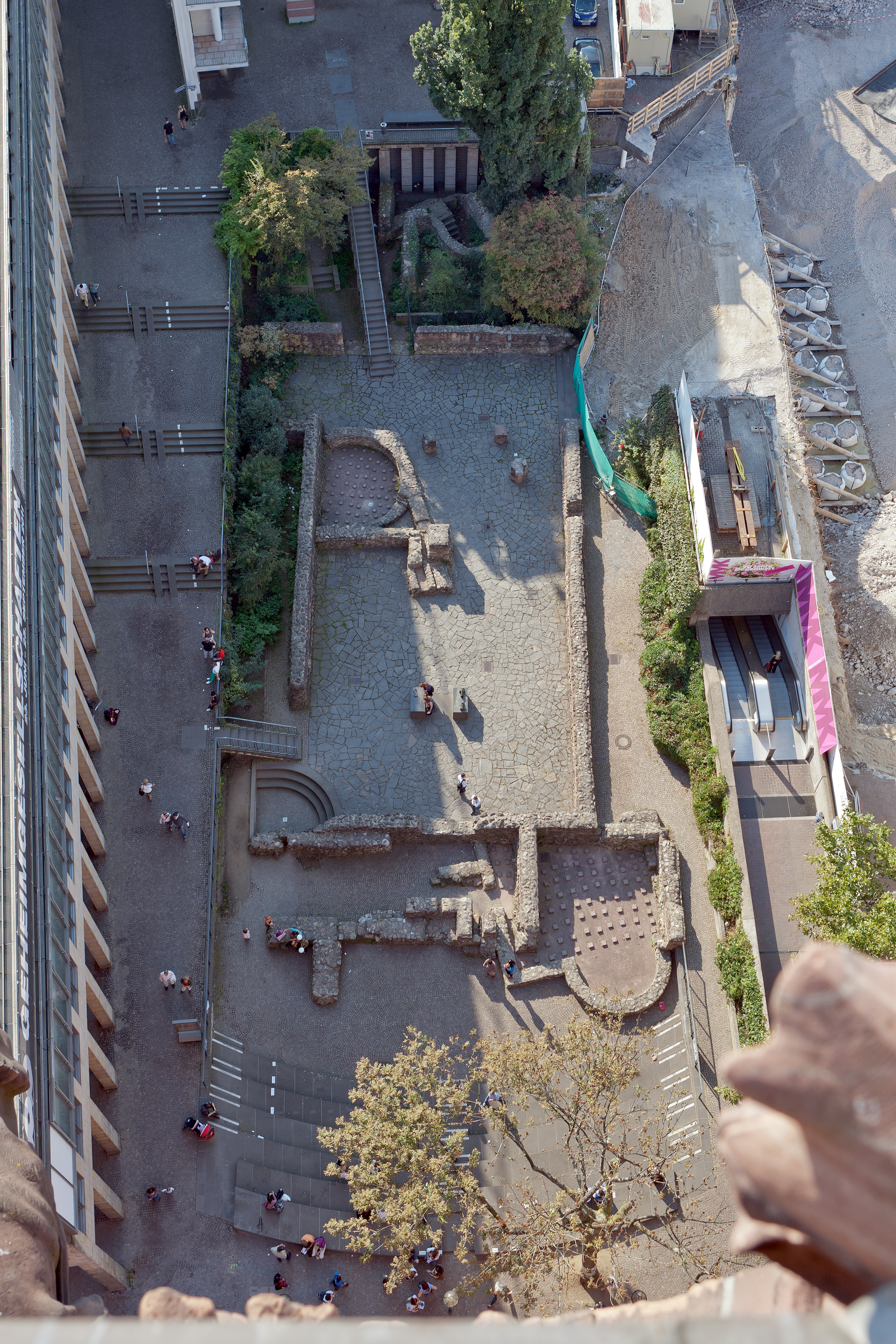
Remains of the royal palace hall (pfalz), founded in 852

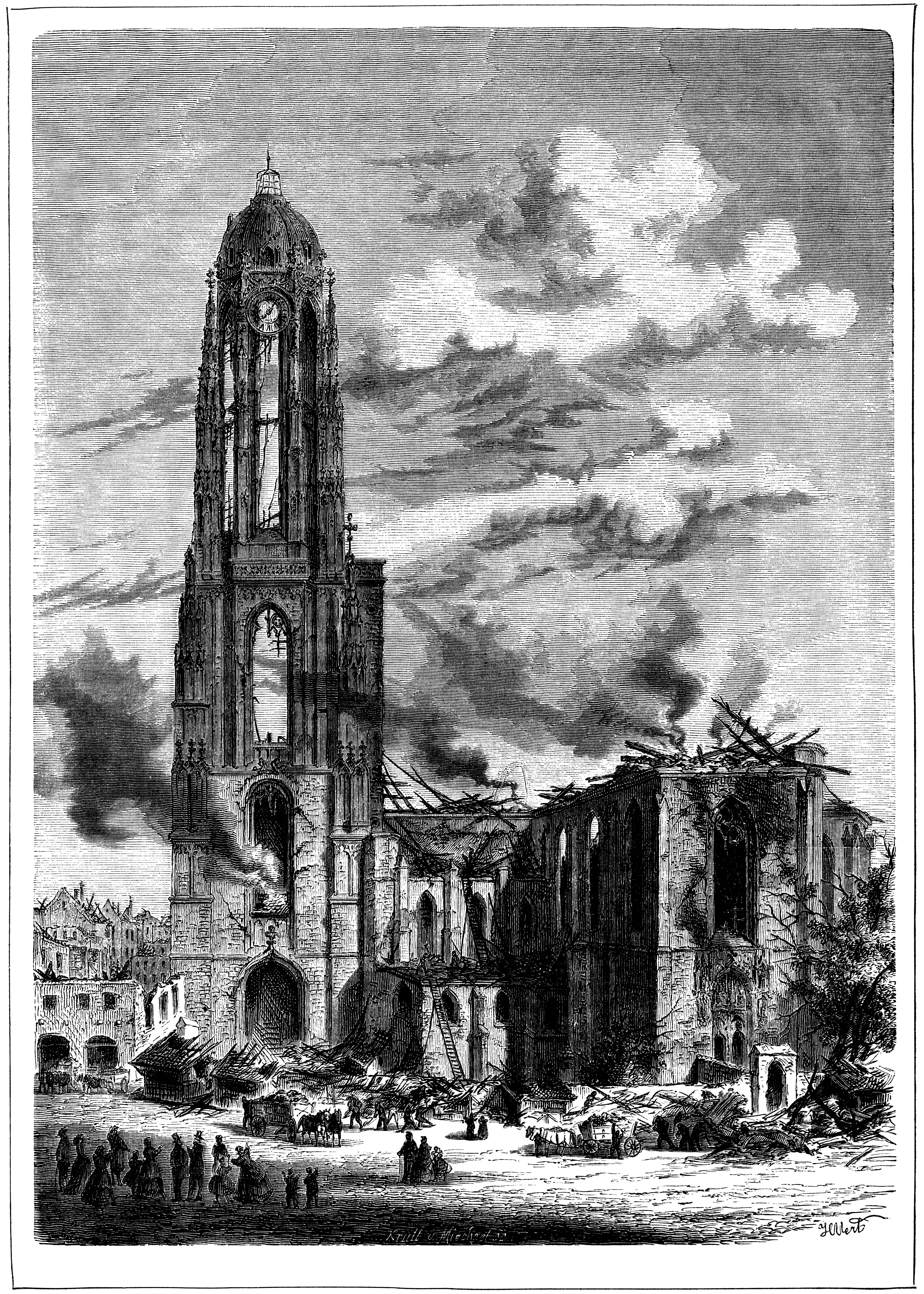
View from the south after the fire of 1867

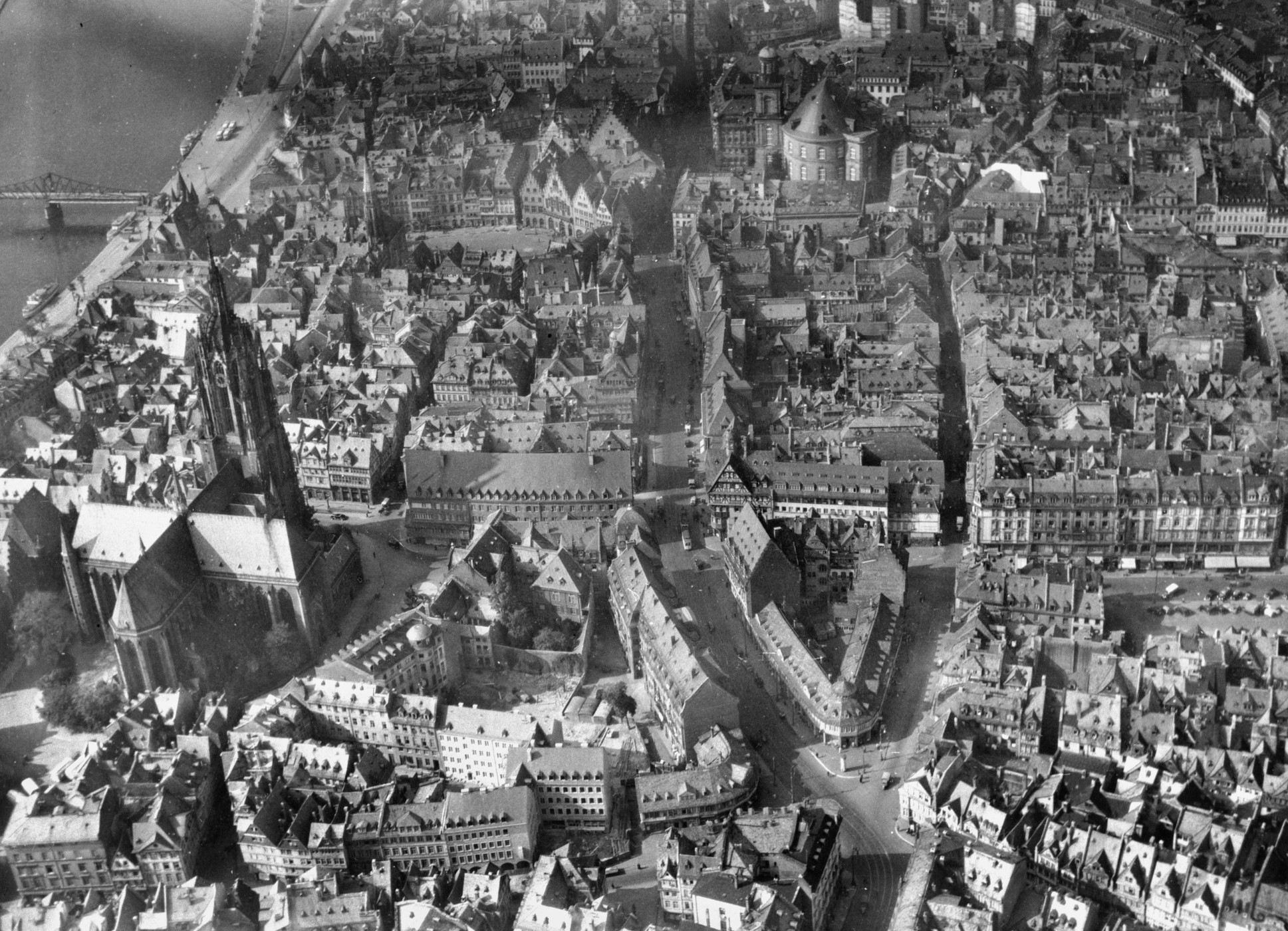
Frankfurt on the Main: 1940s Aerial photograph from the northeast; Cathedral (left); in the background: St. Paul's Church

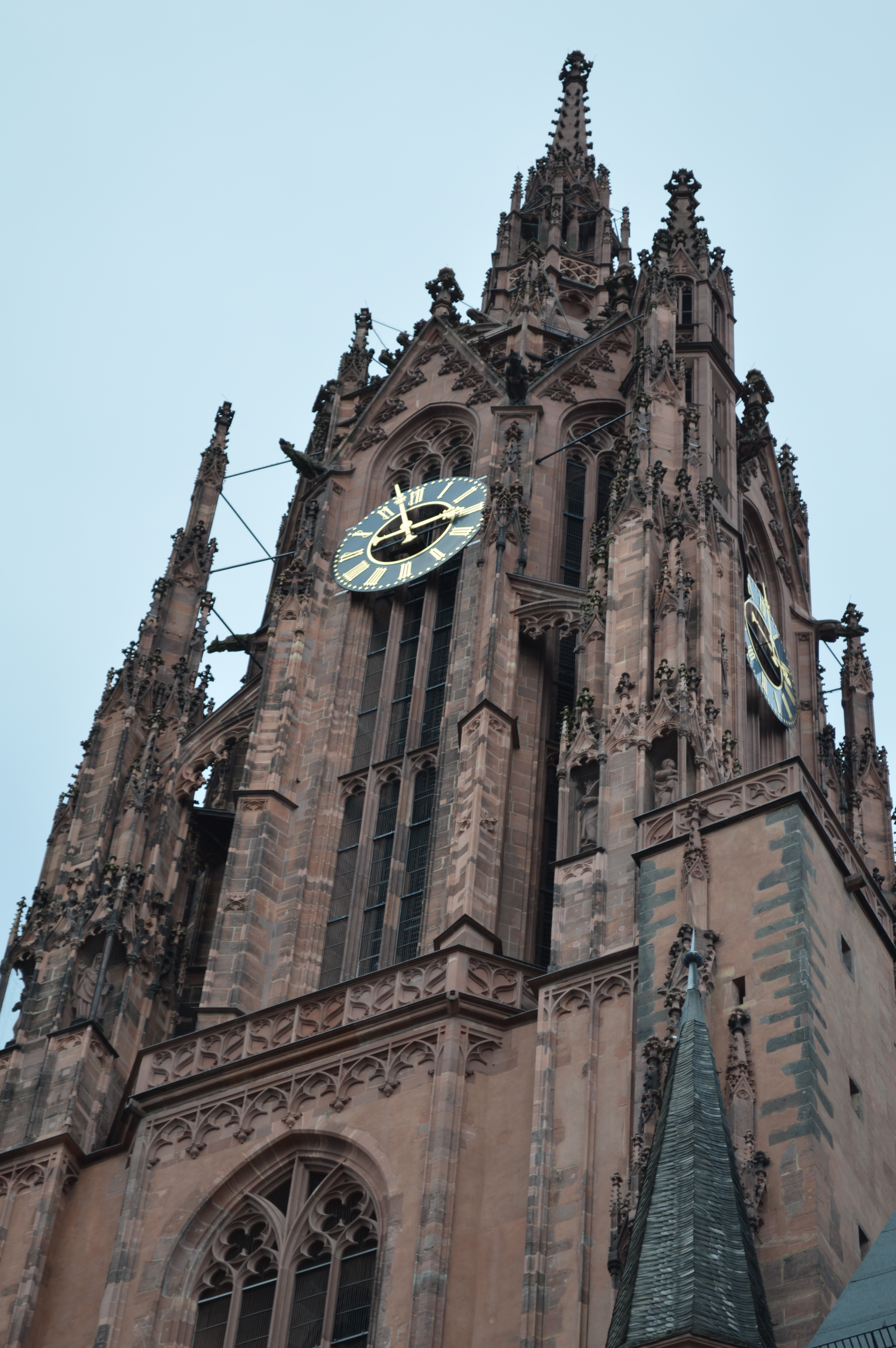
The tower

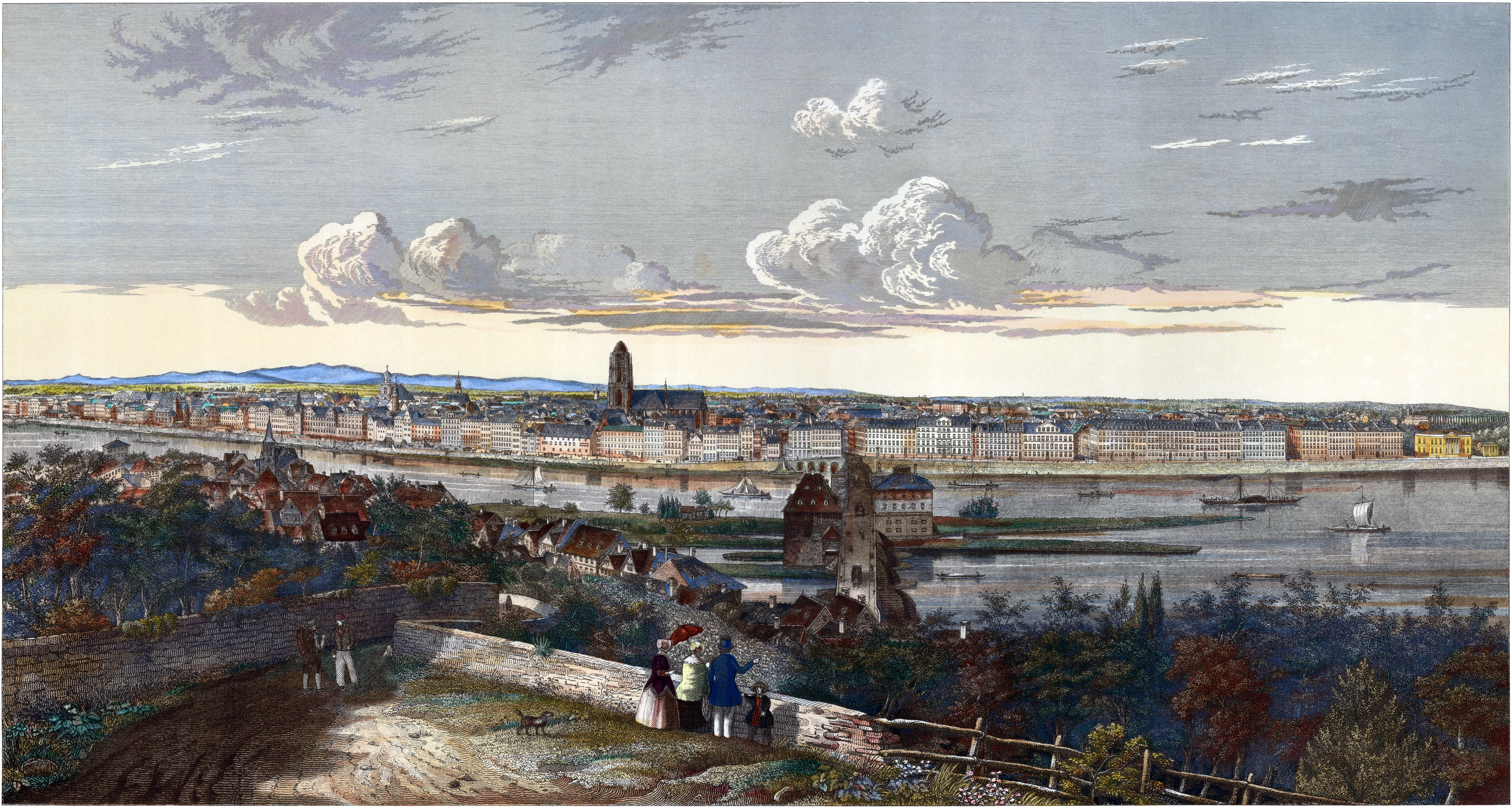
View from Sachsenhaeuser Berg (Mountain of Sachsenhausen) to the north, 1845

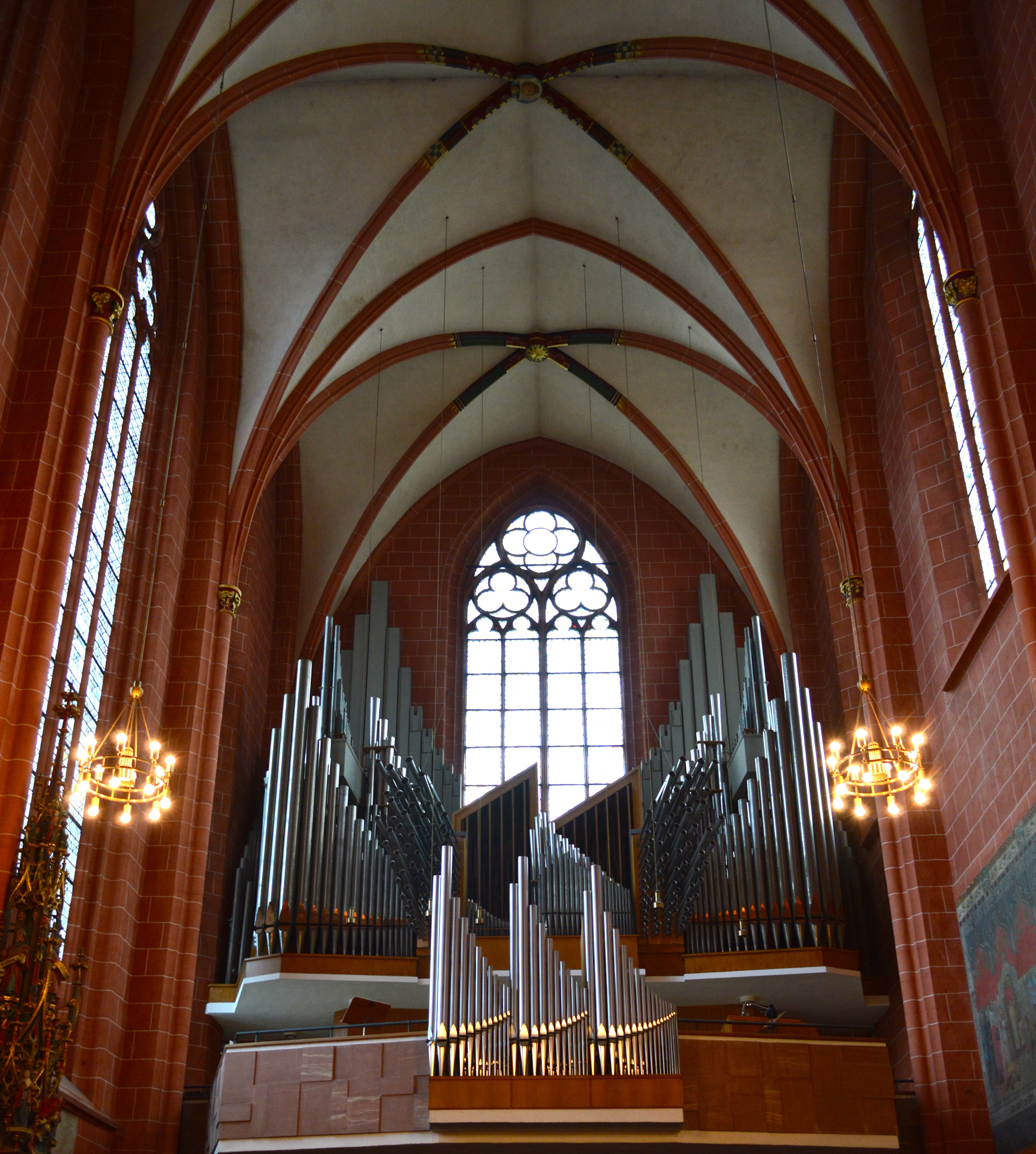
The organ

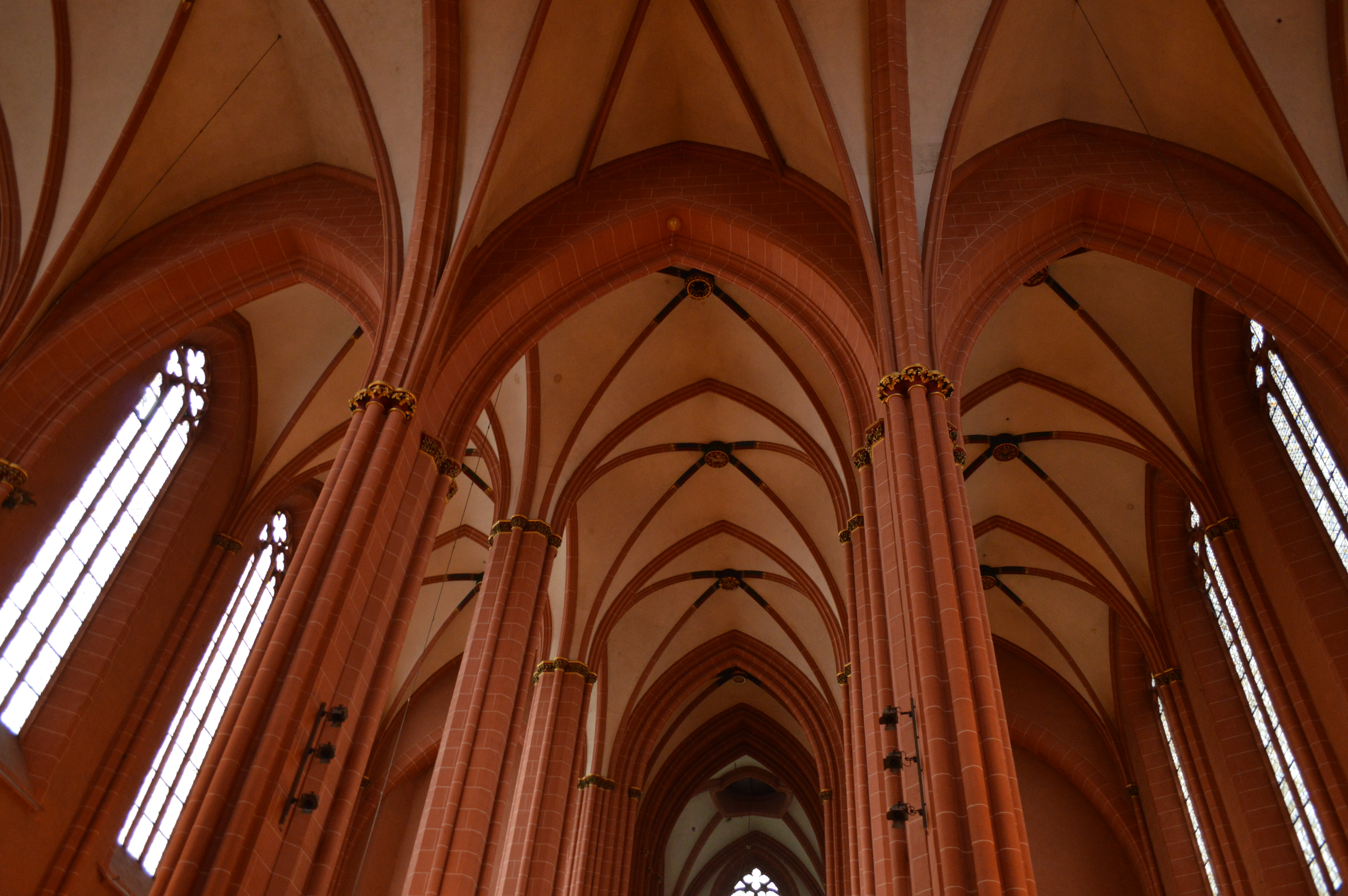
Vaulted ceilings

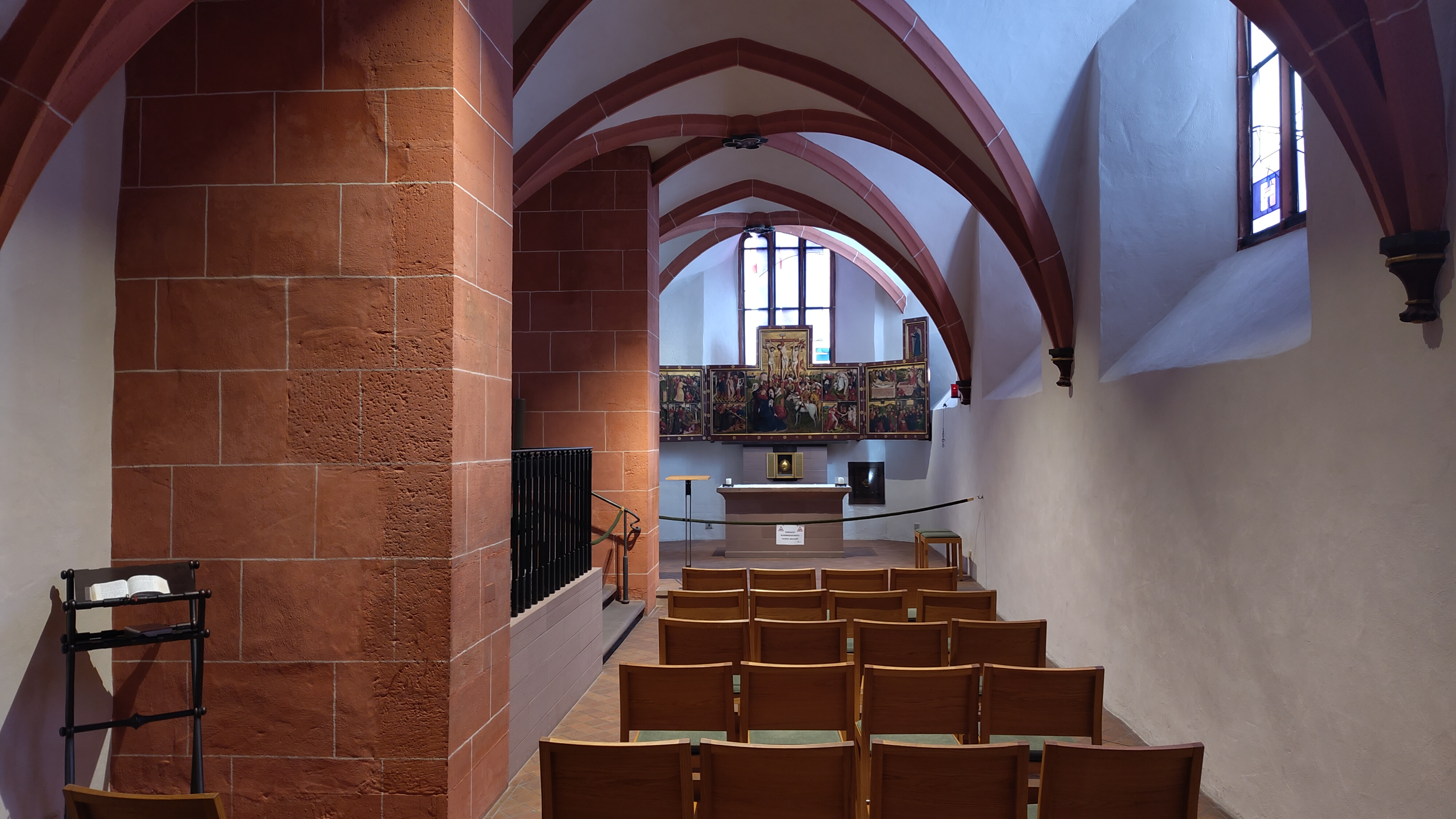
Wahlkapelle (the chapel where the votes for the imperial elections were cast)

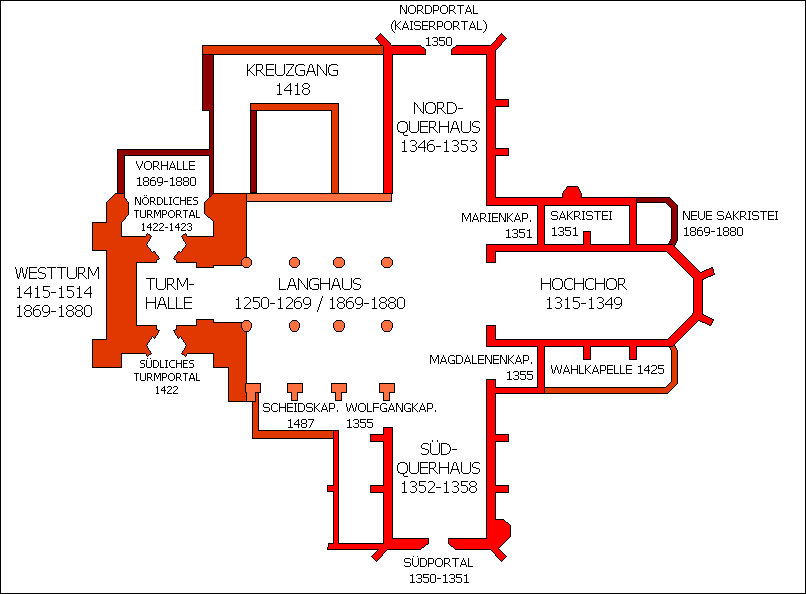
Plan

Historical development of the current building; colors distinguish its various architectural styles.

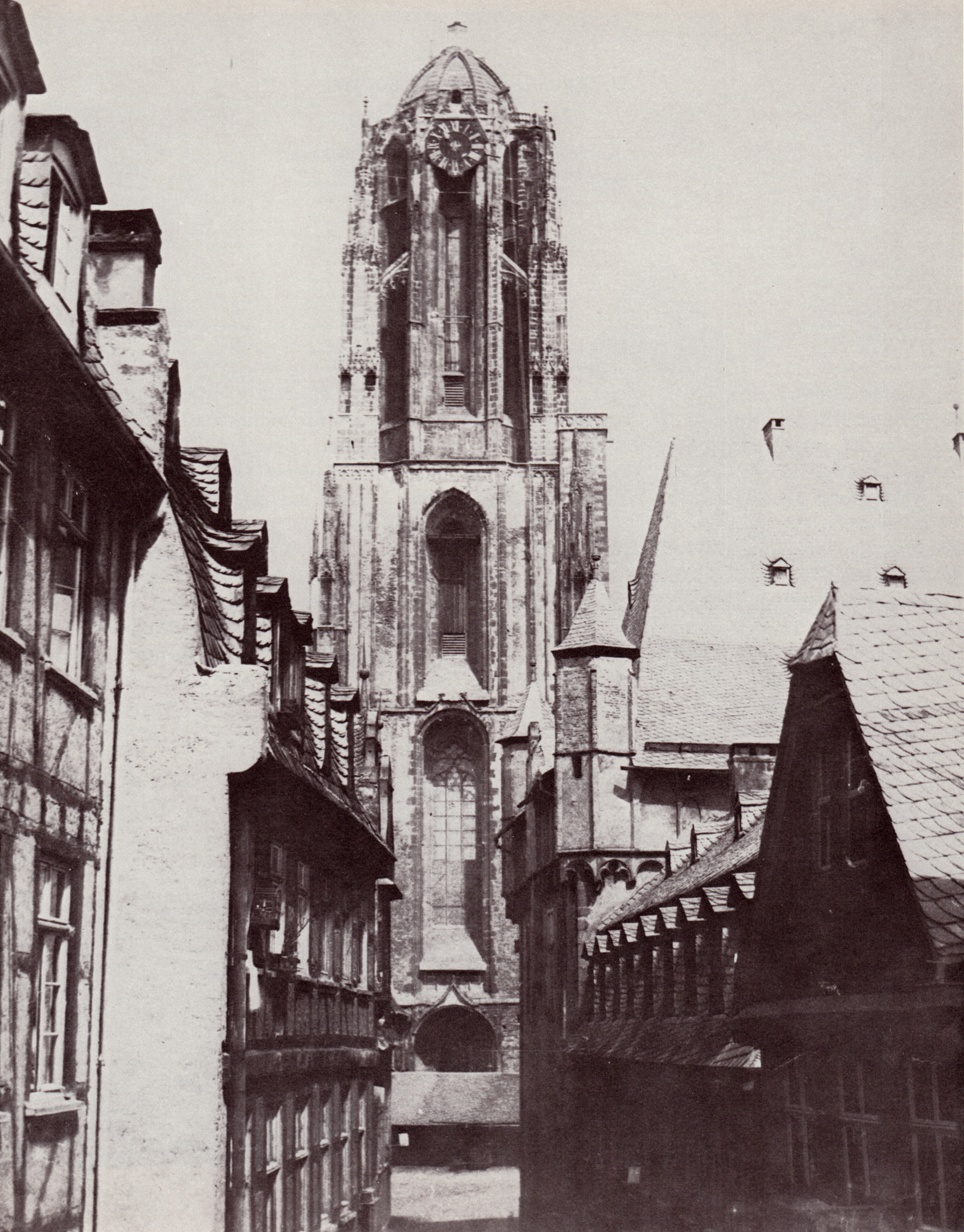
Frankfurt Cathedral: tower before the fire of 1867

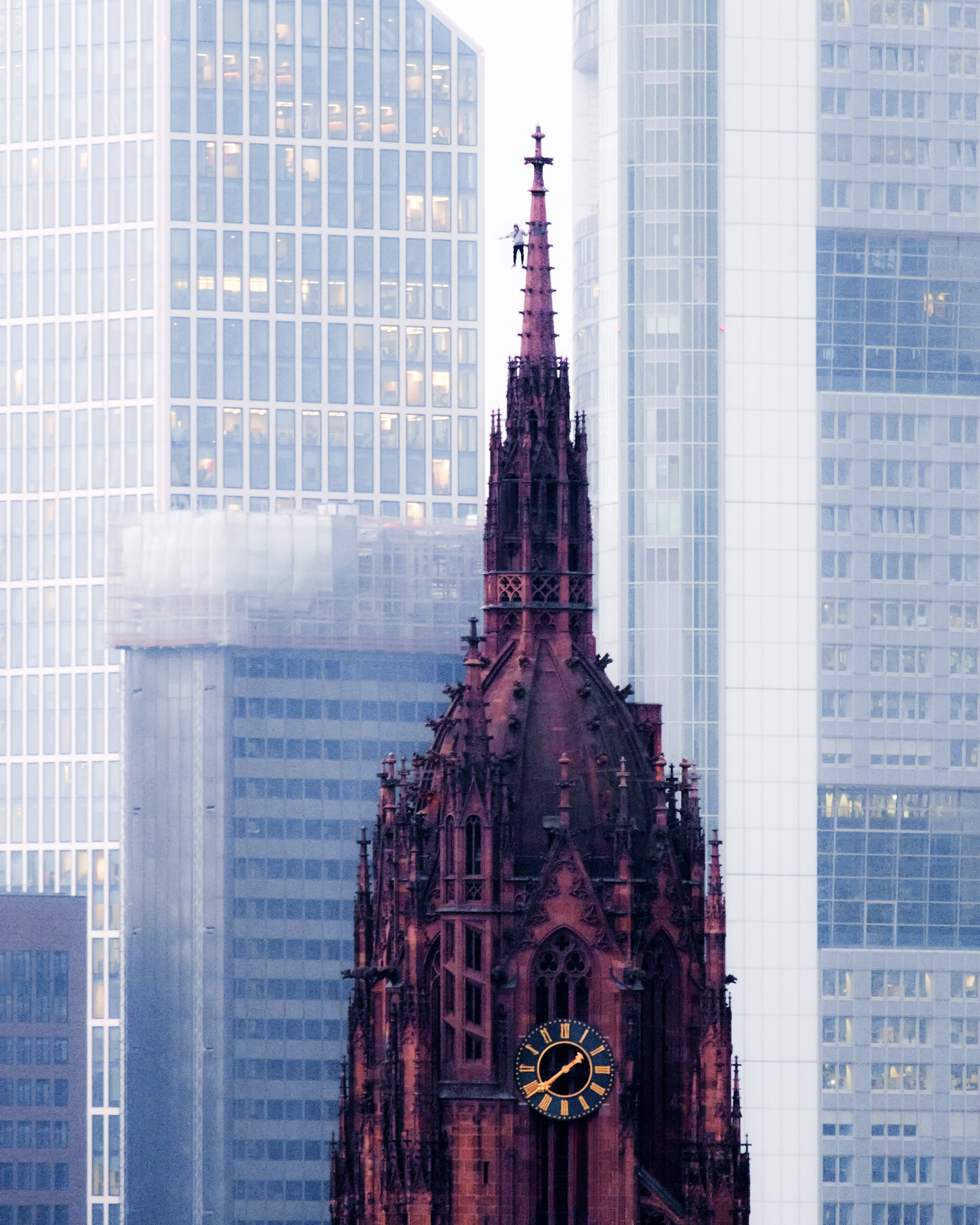
A rooftopper on top of Frankfurts Kaiserdom

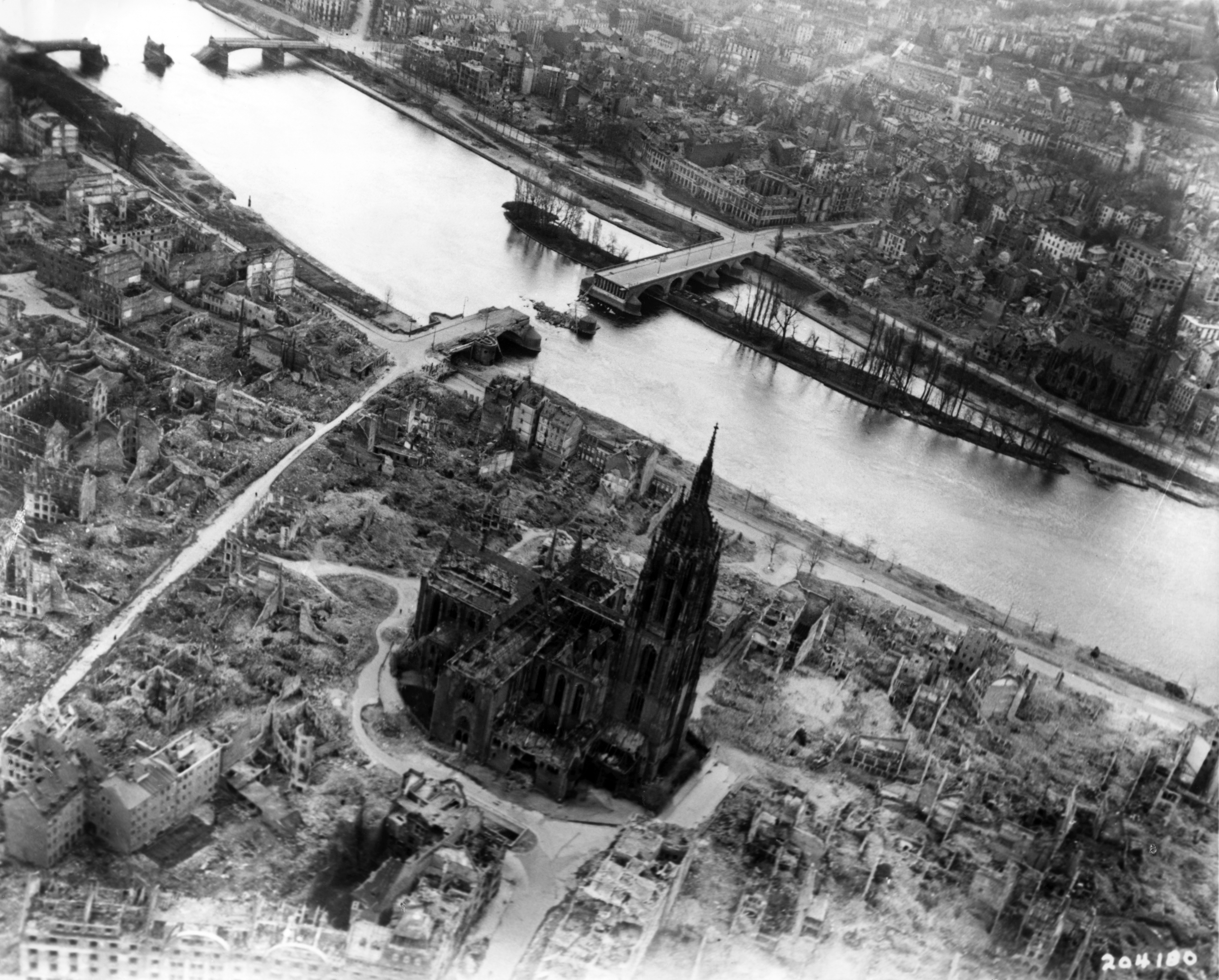
1944 Aerial photograph of the bombed cathedral during World War 2

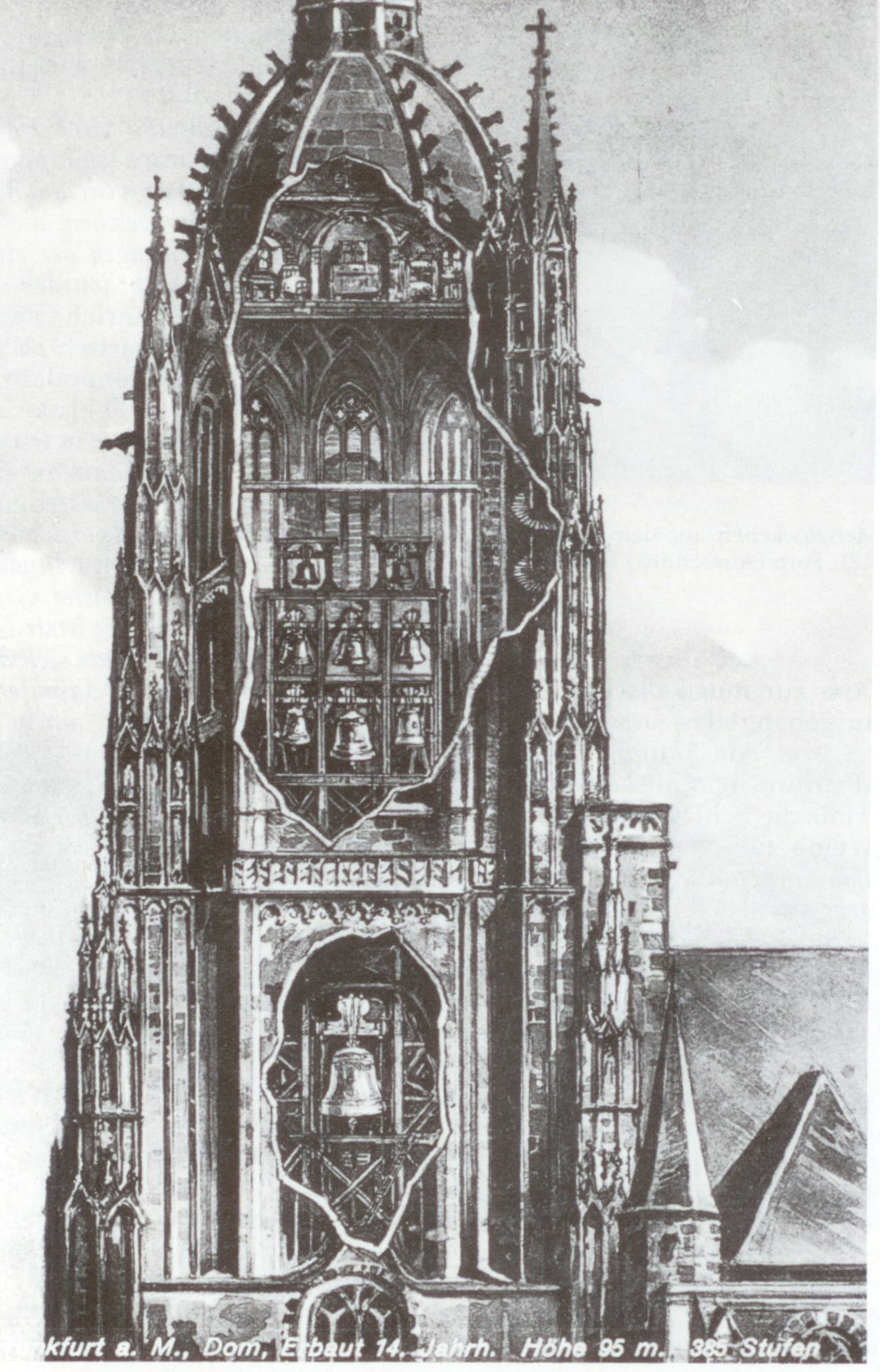
Cut-away of the belfry

== See also ==
- List of Gothic Cathedrals in Europe
- List of royal and imperial elections in the Holy Roman Empire
- 16th-century Western domes
