= St. Martin, Idstein =

St. Martin
- Katholische Pfarrkirche St. Martin; Gemeinde St. Martin Idsteiner Land
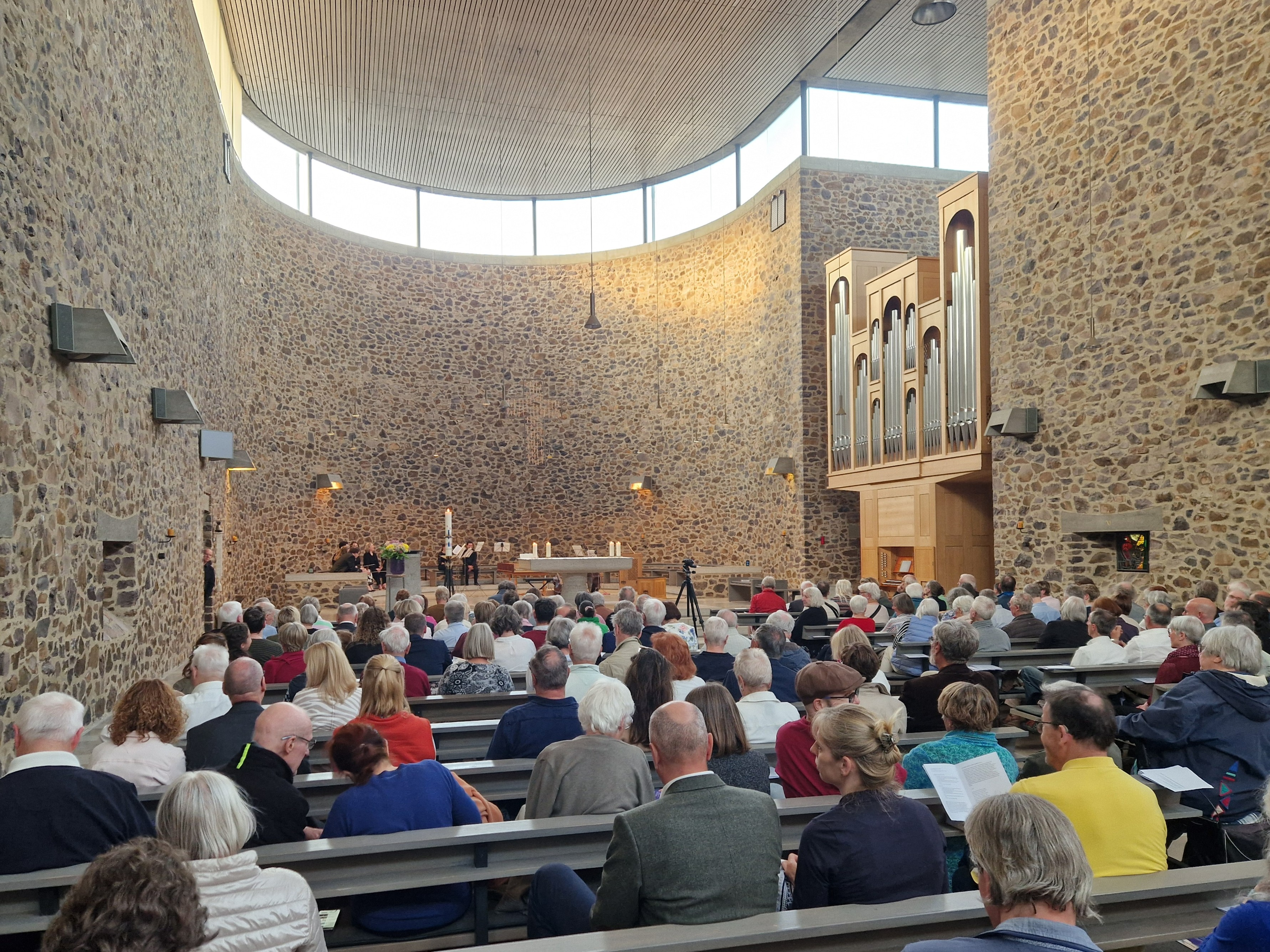
- Concert in honour of architect Franz Josef Hamm, 2 May 2026
- St. Martin
- 50°13′8″N 8°16′0″E
- Location: Idstein, Hesse, Germany
- Denomination: Catholic
- Website: www.st-martin-idstein.de

History
- Dedication: St. Martin
- Consecrated: 5 June 1965

Architecture
- Architect: Johannes Krahn

Specifications
- Capacity: 450
- Length: 45 metres (148 ft)
- Width: 14 metres (46 ft)
- Height: 14 metres (46 ft)

Administration
- Diocese: Limburg

St. Martin is the name of a Catholic parish and church in Idstein, Rheingau-Taunus-Kreis, Germany. The official name of the church is Katholische Pfarrkirche St. Martin. The name of the parish became St. Martin Idsteiner Land on 1 January 2017, when it was merged with five other parishes. The parish is part of the Diocese of Limburg.

St. Martin is the patron saint of Idstein, to whom a Gothic church was dedicated in 1330. The present building, designed by architect Johannes Krahn, was consecrated in 1965. It replaced a church built in 1888 in Gothic Revival style and dedicated to Mary Magdalene; this church was too small for the congregation growing after World War II.

After restoration in 2003 led by Franz Josef Hamm, a new organ was installed in 2006. Church music in services and concerts, performed by several groups including a children's choir and ensembles playing historic instruments, has received attention in the Rhein-Main Region. The parish is in long-term ecumenical contact with the main Protestant church of the town, the Unionskirche, which includes two regular ecumenical services and concerts performed by joint groups of both churches.

== History ==
=== St. Martin parish ===
The beginning of Christianity in Idstein is not documented. When the Idstein Castle was first mentioned in 1102, the area belonged to the Diocese of Trier. Idstein possibly had a church in Romanesque style, which was replaced in 1330 by a Gothic church dedicated to St. Martin, the patron saint of Idstein. It was the church of a Chorherrenstift founded in 1333 for six canons, and became the Protestant church with the Reformation, named Unionskirche in 1917.

During the Reformation, Idstein became Lutheran beginning in 1540 under Philipp I of Nassau-Idstein. The last Catholic canon left the town in 1553, which then had no Catholic congregation until the beginning of the 19th century. In 1806, Frederick Augustus, Duke of Nassau allowed the practice of the Catholic cult again. Thirteen families were permitted to use the chapel of the Schloss. The dukedom became part of the Kingdom of Prussia in 1866. In 1884, the minister Wilhelm Schilo began the building of a church for a growing congregation, collecting money all over Germany. The architect Aloys Vogt, from the local Baugewerbeschule (School for building trades), designed a hall church with two aisles in Gothic Revival style, built from 1887 to 1888. The building, seating 135 people, was dedicated to Mary Magdalene (Magdalenenkirche) by Bishop Karl Klein on 8 October 1888. The Catholic population of Idstein grew considerably after World War II, when many refugees and displaced persons moved to Idstein. Minister Hans Usinger first built a Gemeindehaus (community center) and pursued from 1961 the building of a larger church. The Magdalenenkirche was dynamited in 1963. The building of the new church began in 1963. It was consecrated, again to St. Martin, on 5 June 1965 by Bishop Wilhelm Kempf. Klaus Schmidt was the parish priest from 1975 to 2005, and served as a priest afterwards, singing in the choir until 2026.

On 1 January 2017, the parish became part of the larger St. Martin Idsteiner Land parish, which includes five other former parishes: Maria Königin in Niedernhausen, St. Nikolaus von Flüe in Idstein-Wörsdorf, St. Martha in Niedernhausen-Engenhahn, St. Michael in Niedernhausen-Oberjosbach and St. Thomas in Waldems.

=== Construction of the present church ===
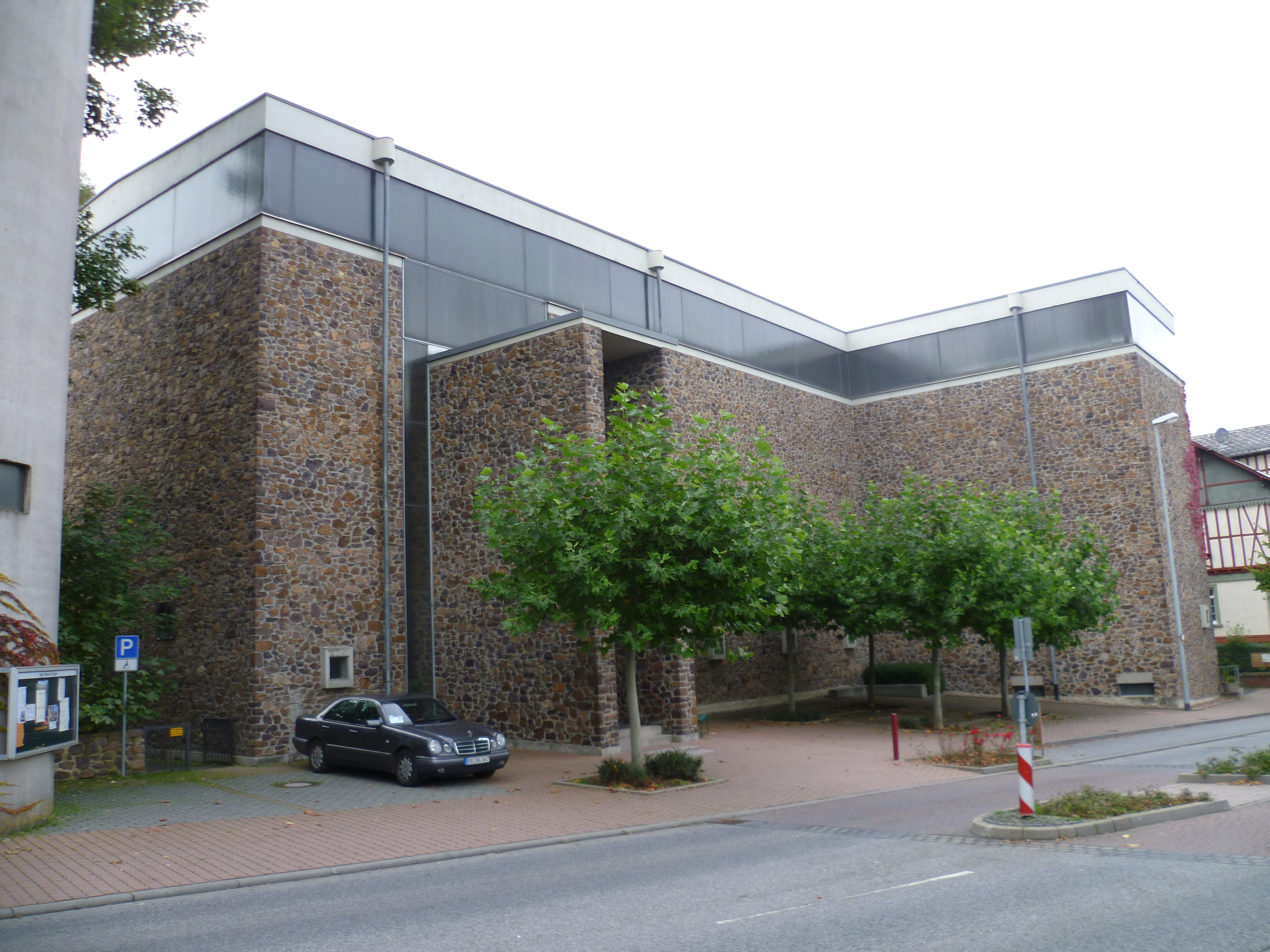
St. Martin, Idstein

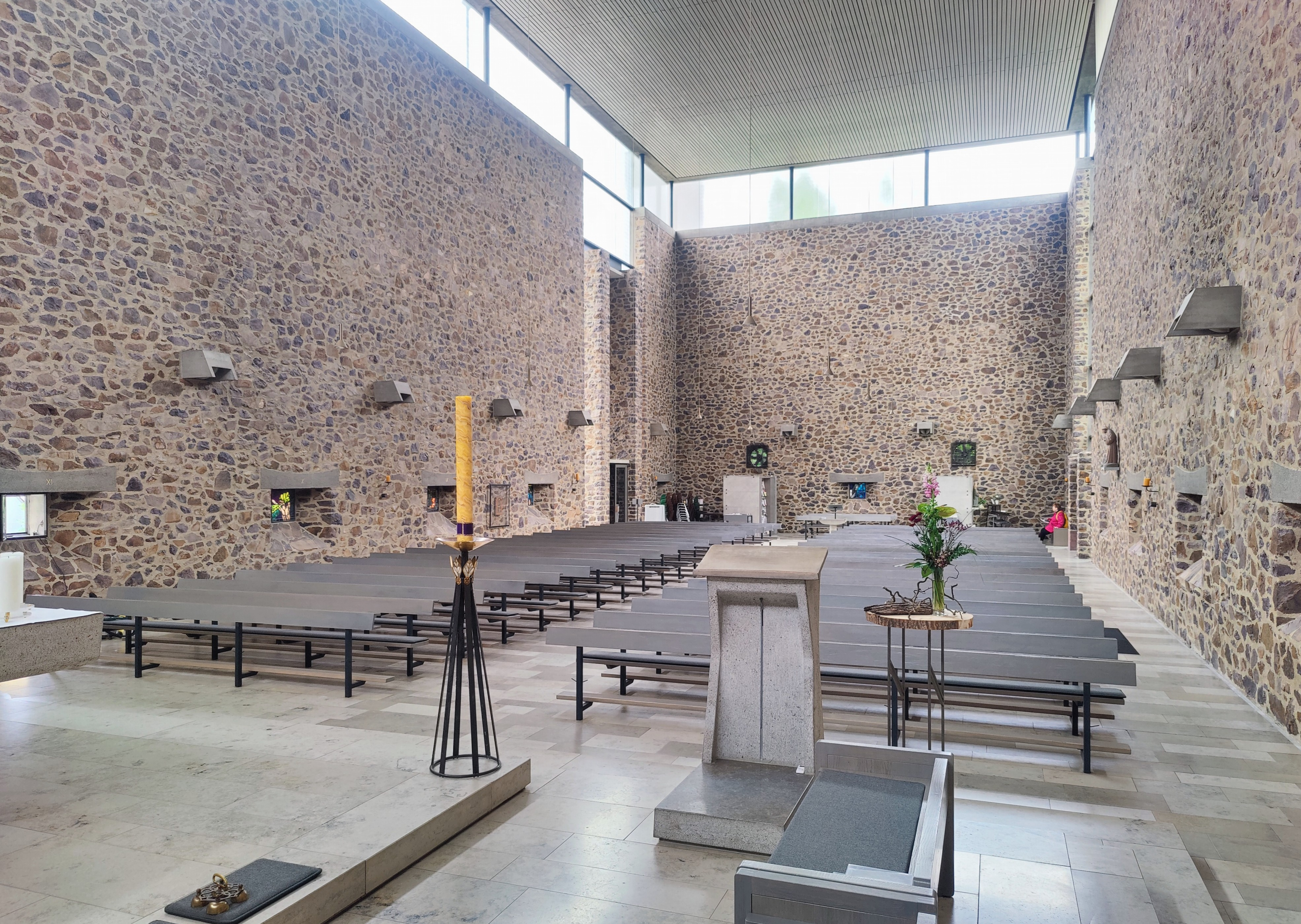
Interior

Professor Johannes Krahn, who built several churches and early skyscrapers such as the Beehive House in Frankfurt am Main, designed a space recalling elements of an early Romanesque Basilica. In a simple shape, a single long nave is concluded by a semicircle choir around the altar. On the right side the wall opens to a side chapel, reminiscent of a transept. The outer walls are sandstone, visible both inside and outside. Light flows in from a band of windows under the plain wooden ceiling. The combination of materials has been compared to Le Corbusier. The building recalls the austere style of sacred architecture of the 1950s.

The floor is of Jura marble, the altar, ambo, baptismal font and tabernacle are made of Lahn marble. The wall behind the altar held a neo-Gothic crucifixion scene of Mary, John, and Mary Magdalene under the cross, from the Magdalenenkirche. Low stained glass windows forming the Stations of the Cross were designed by Paul Corazolla from Berlin. The first organ was built by E. F. Walcker & Cie. and consecrated in 1974. It was placed on the right side in the opening for the chapel, visible to the congregation. The free-standing bell tower, housing four bells, is 42 m high.

=== Restoration in 2003 ===
The walls of the church were completely restored in 2003. At the same time the altar was moved closer to the congregation, making more room for the choir. The baptismal font was relocated from the chapel to the front, opposite the ambo. The tabernacle, which had been where the baptismal font is now, and the crucifixion scene were moved to the chapel, creating a chapel for adoration. The restoration works were directed by Franz Josef Hamm from Limburg. The new cross above the altar was created by a group of young people in preparation for confirmation. During the restoration the organ had to be taken apart. The parish decided not to restore it but to have a new organ built.

== Church music ==
=== Mebold organ and organ concerts ===
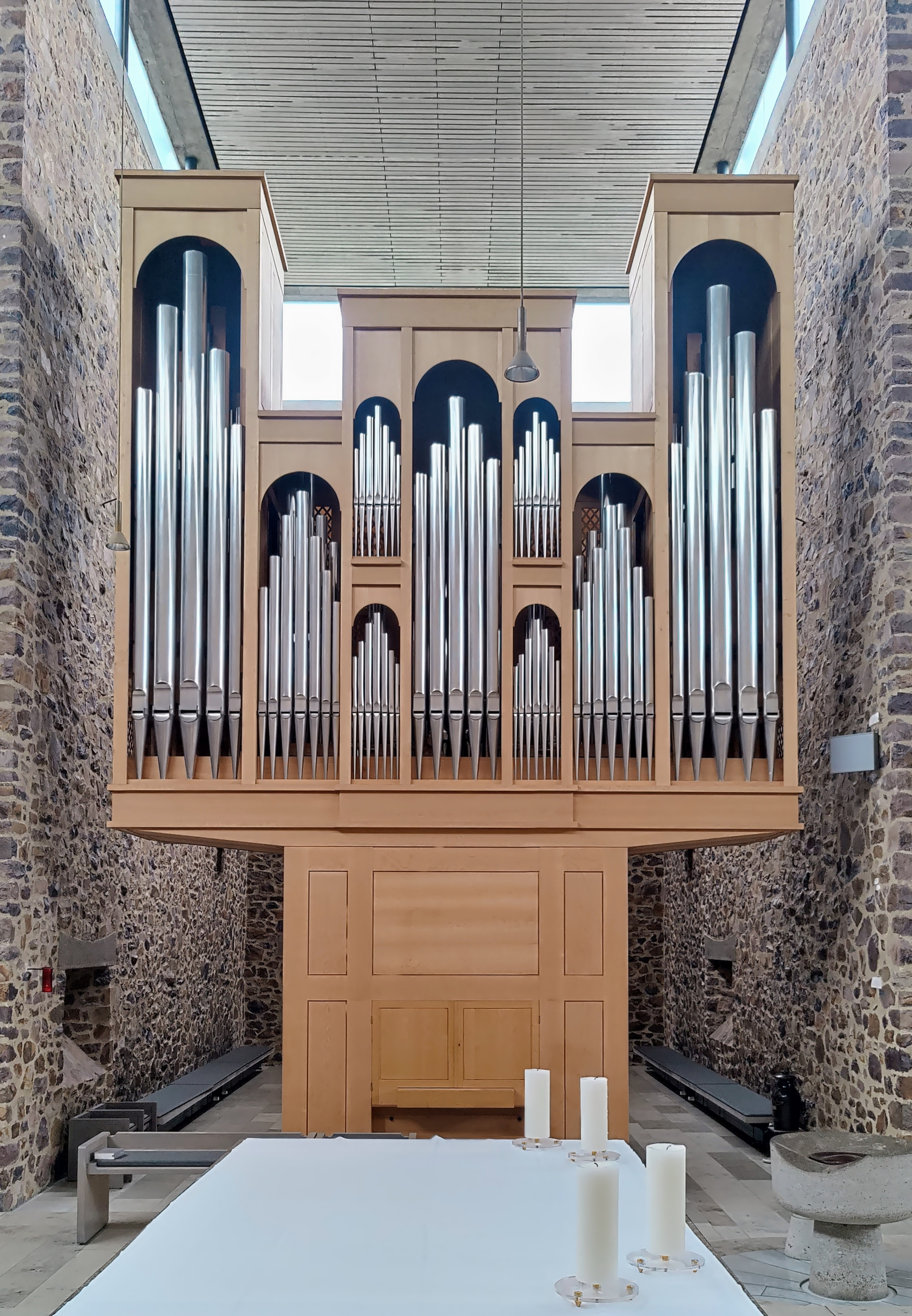
Mebold organ, 2023

The organ was built by Orgelbau Mebold and consecrated on 22 January 2006. The instrument has 1,888 pipes and 33 stops on two manuals and a pedalboard. The layout of its great division (Hauptwerk) reflects the classic organ construction of the Baroque period, whilst the swell division (or swell box) (Schwellwerk) has the timbre of the Romantic, which makes it possible to play a wide range of the organ repertoire from different eras. The first organ concert on the Mebold organ was played by Dan Zerfaß, organist of the Worms Cathedral. The organ is used mostly in services, but has been played in concerts of artists such as Kalevi Kiviniemi. In 2005 Graham Waterhouse was the soloist in the premiere of his Cello Concerto in the chamber version on 5 August 2005. Giora Feidman and Matthias Eisenberg performed a duo programme on 14 November 2008. Christian Schmitt played in 2007 with the chamber choir of the Hochschule für Musik und Darstellende Kunst Frankfurt, conducted by Wolfgang Schäfer, who returned in 2010 to conduct the Frankfurter Kammerchor.

=== Choral music ===
Franz Fink has been the cantor of St. Martin since 1992, conducting five musical groups, a children's choir Kinderchor St. Martin, the Chor St. Martin, the Martinis (a chamber choir of mostly young people), the Orchester St. Martin, and the Barock-Consort St. Martin on period instruments. The church choir was named Chor St. Martin in 1973. The Martinis were founded in 1988 by Thomas Gabriel as a youth choir.

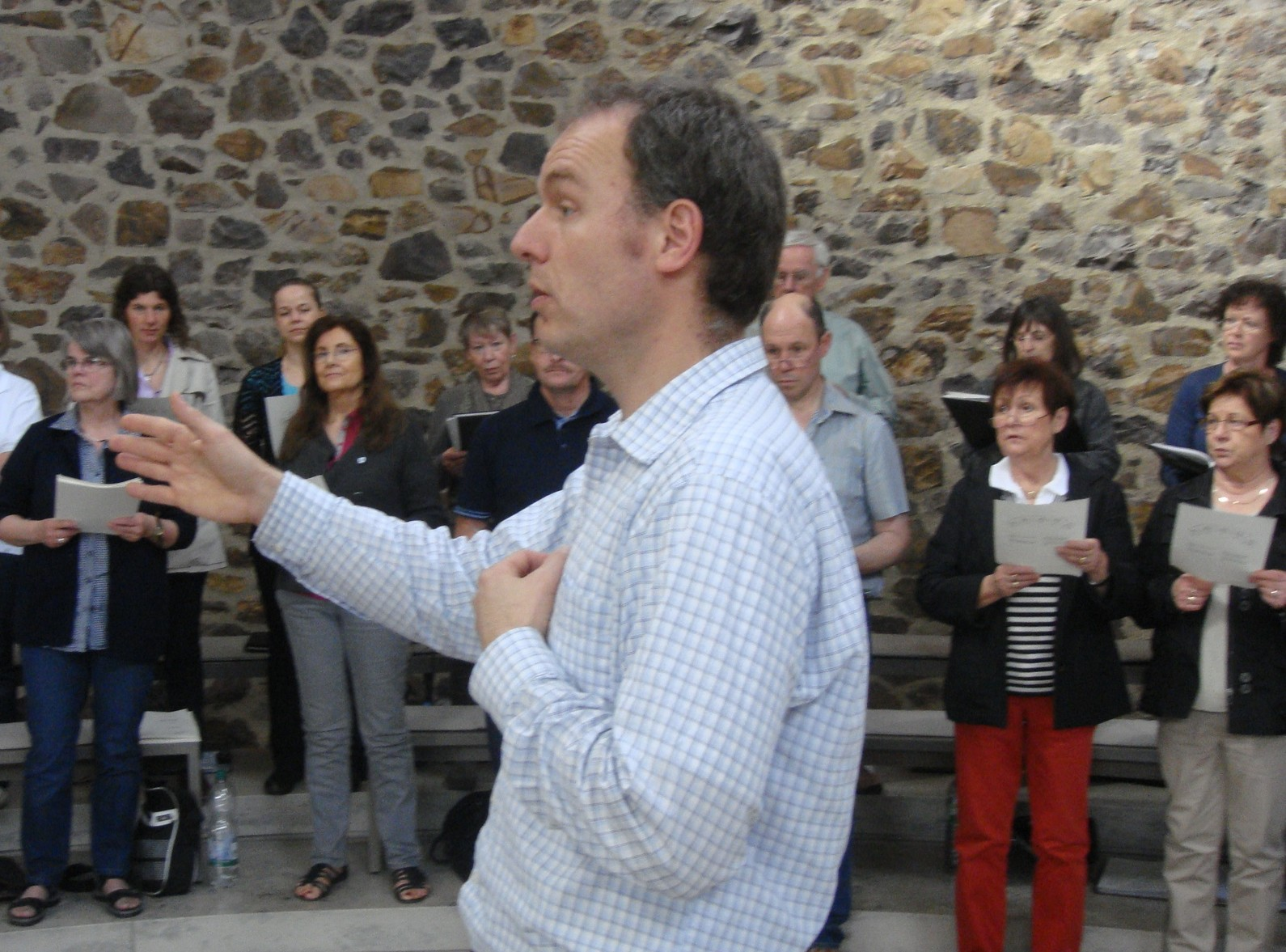
Franz Fink in rehearsal of Immortal Bach by Nystedt for five four-part choirs, 24 April 2012

All groups perform in services, including masses such as Haydn's Missa brevis Sancti Joannis de Deo, Leopold Mozart's Missa in C, K. 115, Mozart's Missa brevis in D minor, K. 65 and Spatzenmesse, Monteverdi's Missa in F from Selva morale e spirituale, the mass for double choir from Missodia Sionia by Michael Praetorius, the Missa aulica by František Xaver Brixi, the Missa secundi toni by Johann Ernst Eberlin, and masses by Johann Caspar Ferdinand Fischer, Hans Leo Hassler, Alberich Mazak, Flor Peeters and Gottfried Heinrich Stölzel. The repertory includes motets such as Bohuslav Matěj Černohorský's Laudetur Jesus Christus, Kuhnau's Tristis est anima mea, Rheinberger's Abendlied and Bruckner's Locus iste.

The groups have also included contemporary music, such as that by Heinz Werner Zimmermann, Pärt's De profundis, Barber's Agnus Dei, Sandström's Es ist ein Ros entsprungen, and Whitacre's Lux Aurumque. The Martinis have performed Bach cantatas, Gottes Zeit ist die allerbeste Zeit, BWV 106 (Actus tragicus), in Geistliche Abendmusik (a Vespers service) on 20 November 2005, and Brich dem Hungrigen dein Brot, BWV 39, in a cantata service.

Concerts and services have also been performed by guest ensembles such as the Ukrainian chamber choir OREYA. The choirs of St. Martin travelled to England in 2006 to attend services and evensong in Christ Church, Oxford, Salisbury Cathedral and St Paul's Cathedral, London. They travelled to Leipzig in 2008 to hear the Thomanerchor in Motette and services. In 2009 they sang with other choirs of the diocese in the Limburg Cathedral from the Missa primi toni octo vocum of Stefano Bernardi for double chorus, conducted by Joachim Dreher and Franz Fink. In 2016, they performed at the Cathedral the premiere of the oratorio Laudato si' with the choirs of Liebfrauen, Frankfurt, conducted by the composer Peter Reulein. The performance was repeated at the Frankfurt Cathedral in 2017.

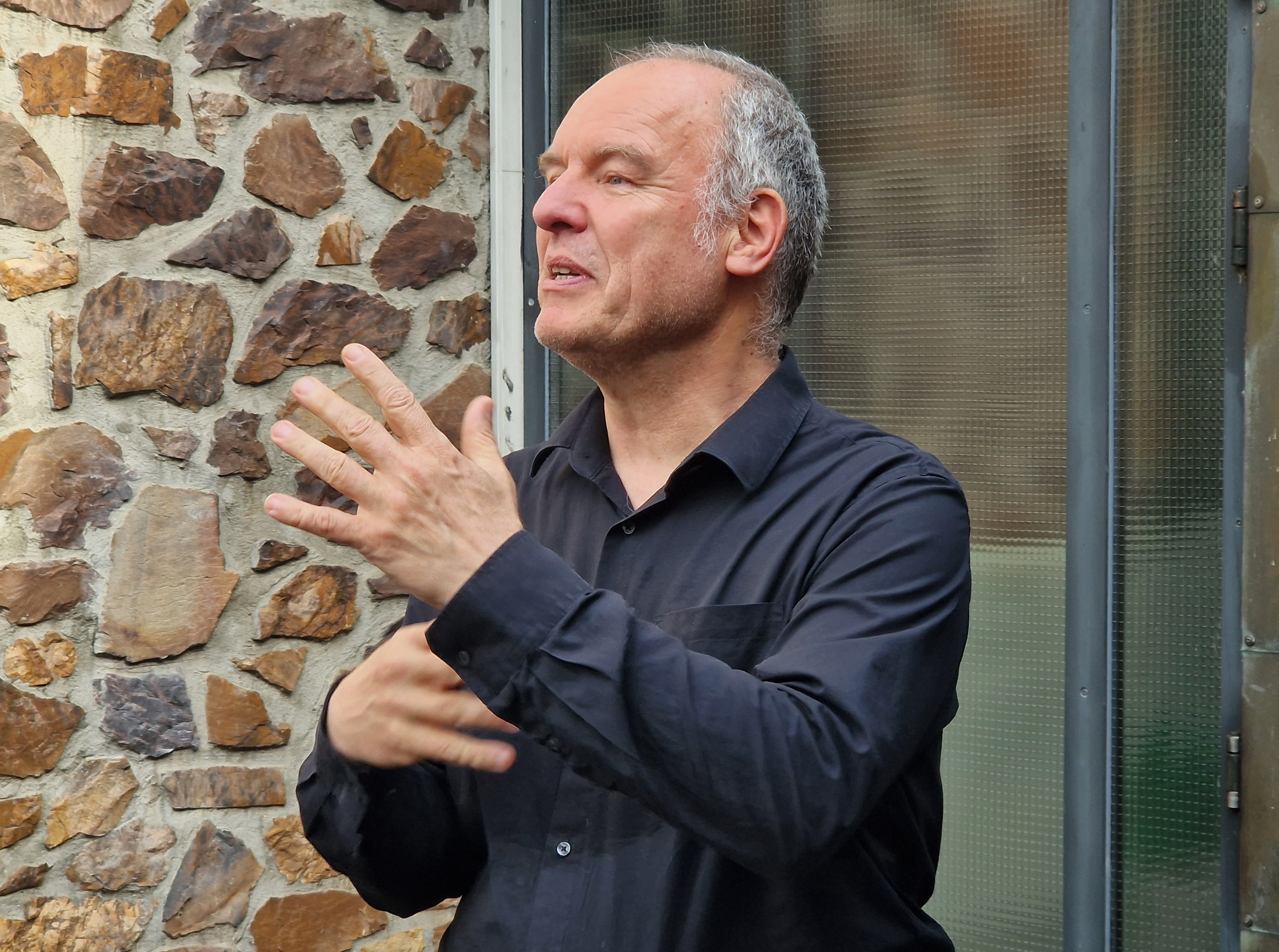
Fink addressing three choirs before an ecumenical performance of Dan Forrest's Jubilate Deo, May 2026

On 26 December 2019, the Hessian broadcaster hr4 aired a Christmas service, in which a project choir of mostly choir members performed Rutter's Angels' Carol and Christmas Lullaby, among others.

==== Abendlob ====
In addition to singing in mass on Sundays and feast days, the choirs added irregular liturgies of Abendlob, in the tradition of the Anglican Evensong, singing psalms, Magnificat and Nunc dimittis. An Abendlob on the occasion of the Kreuzfest (Feast of the Cross) in 2018 had Psalm 100 set by Charles Villiers Stanford, Magnificat and Nunc dimittis in D by Charles Wood, Mozart's Ave verum corpus and Rheinberger's Abendlied. An Abendlob in Advent 2019 contained, among others, Hammerschmidt's Machet die Tore weit, Hassler's Dixit Maria, Vivaldi's Magnificat, RV 610, and Biebl's Ave Maria.

==== Choral concerts ====
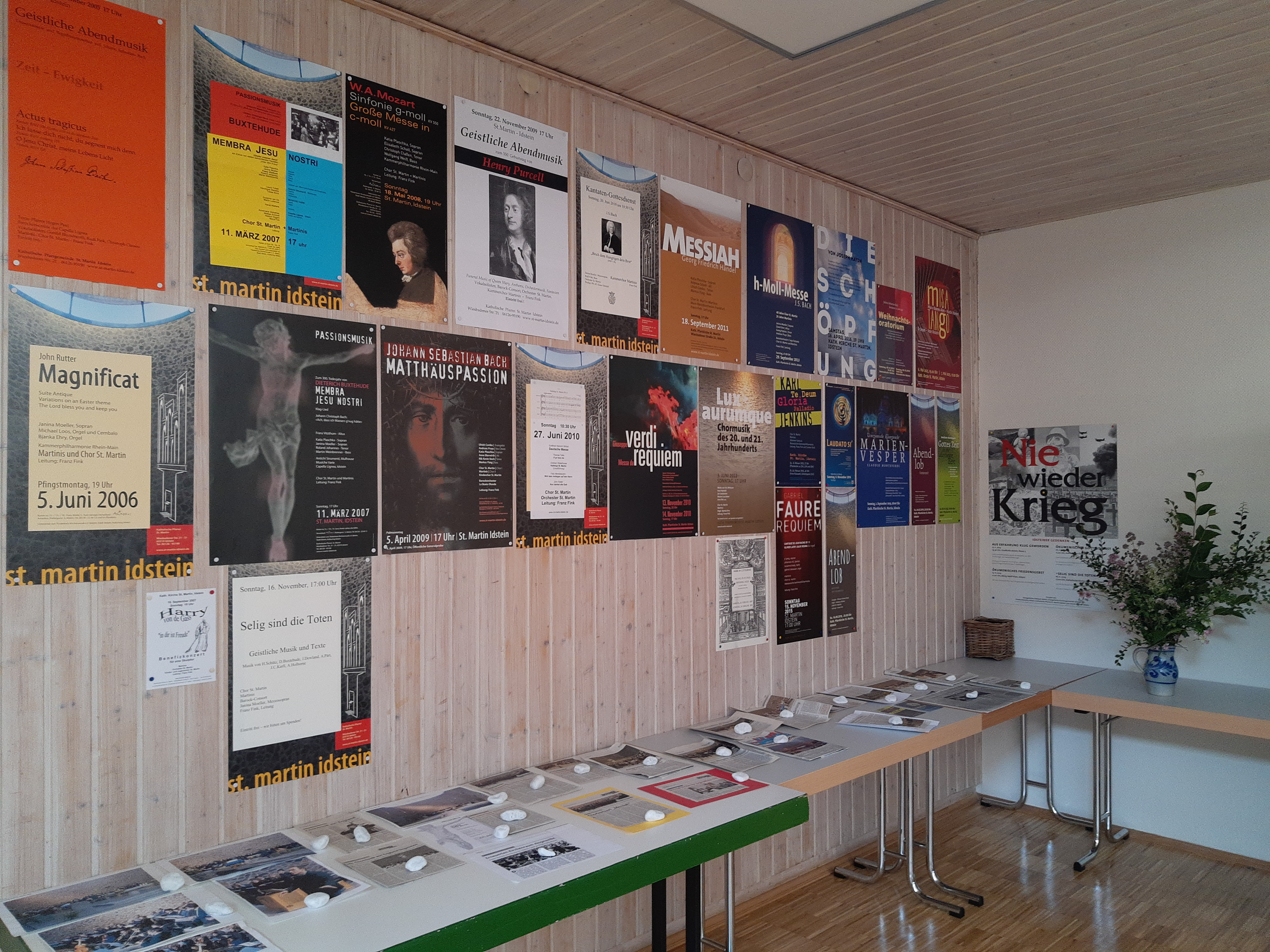
Concert posters from 2005, exhibited in 2023

An annual choral concert with soloists and orchestra has been performed by the combined choirs. Specialized orchestras on period instruments, namely La Beata Olanda (Freiburg), Antichi Strumenti (Mulhouse), Main-Barockorchester Frankfurt and L'arpa festante (Munich), accompanied works by Bach, Buxtehude, Handel, Haydn and Schütz in historically informed performances, also the church's groups Capella lignea and Barock-Consort St. Martin. Several concerts were collaborations with other choirs; some were ecumenical projects with Protestant choirs, early the choir of the Protestant church of Geisenheim (now: Neue Rheingauer Kantorei) and from 2003 several with the Idsteiner Kantorei, the choir at the Unionskirche in Idstein conducted by Carsten Koch. Two concerts of large works with them also included the De Wase Kantorij, a choir from the Belgian sister city Zwijndrecht, in international collaboration.

In the following table, the regular conductor Franz Fink is not mentioned, only guest conductors.

Concerts with choirs of St. Martin
Date	Composer	Work	Conductor / Choir / Orchestra	Soloists	Location
15 March 1998	Bach	St Matthew Passion (details)	Chor St. Martin La Beata Olanda	Max Ciolek (Ev.); Max van Egmond (vox Christi); Elisabeth Scholl; Andreas Scholl; Robert Stratford	
8 May 1999	Puccini	Messa di Gloria	Thassilo Schlenther: Chor St. Martin; Ev. Chor Geisenheim; Kammerphilharmonie Rhein-Main	Daniel Sans; Christof Fischesser	St. Martin; Basilika of Schloss Johannisberg
28 May 2000 Part of Idsteiner Bachtage	Bach	Sinfonia from the Easter Oratorio; Erfreut euch, ihr Herzen, BWV 66; Sinfonia from BWV 42; Sinfonia and opening chorus from Wir danken dir, Gott, wir danken dir, BWV 29; Erschallet, ihr Lieder BWV 172	Chor St. Martin Antichi Strumenti	Annegret Kleindopf; Christine Wehler; Martin Krumbiegel; Johannes Scholl	
20 October 2001	Rutter; Britten	Requiem; The Company of Heaven	Thassilo Schlenther: Chor St. Martin; Ev. Chor Geisenheim; Kammerphilharmonie Rhein-Main	Kalliopi Patrona; Daniel Sans; Richard Martin (speaker)	Basilika of Schloss Johannisberg; St. Martin
15 June 2002 Part of Hessentag	Haydn	Die Schöpfung (The Creation)	Edwin Müller: Chor St. Martin; Idsteiner Kantorei; Antichi Strumenti	Valentina Farcas; Daniel Sans; Johannes Schendel	
29 June 2003	Handel	Eternal Source of Light Divine; Gloria; Utrecht Te Deum and Jubilate	Chor St. Martin; Martinis; Antichi Strumenti	Katia Plaschka	Unionskirche
11 December 2004; 12 Dec	Bach	Christmas Oratorio	Chor St. Martin; Martinis; Antichi Strumenti	Katia Plaschka; Franz Vitzthum; Christoph Claßen; Michael Pospíšil	
9 October 2005 Choral Music from England	Thomas Tallis; William Byrd; Henry Purcell; James Kent; Maurice Greene; Charles Villiers Stanford; Charles Wood; Edward Elgar; John Rutter		Chor St. Martin; Martinis; Kinderchor St. Martin		
5 June 2006	Rutter	Magnificat; "The Lord bless you and keep you"	Chor St. Martin; Martinis; Kammerphilharmonie Rhein-Main	Janina Moeller	
11 March 2007	Buxtehude	Klag-Lied; Membra Jesu nostri	Chor St. Martin; Martinis; Antichi Strumenti; Capella Lignea	Katia Plaschka; Janina Moeller; Franz Vitzthum	
18 May 2008	Mozart	Great Mass in C minor	Chor St. Martin; Martinis; Kammerphilharmonie Rhein-Main	Katia Plaschka; Elisabeth Scholl; Christoph Claßen; Wolfgang Weiß	
5 April 2009	Bach	St Matthew Passion	Chor St. Martin; Martinis; La Beata Olanda	Ulrich Cordes (Ev.); Andreas Pruys (vox Christi); Katia Plaschka; Anne Bierwirth; Klaus Mertens	
13 November 2010; 14 November 2010	Verdi	Messa da Requiem	Carsten Koch: Chor St. Martin; Idsteiner Kantorei; Martinis; Nassauische Kammerphilharmonie	Christiane Kohl; Christa Bonhoff; Dantes Diwiak; Andreas Pruys	
18 September 2011	Handel	Messiah	Chor St. Martin; Martinis; Main-Barockorchester Frankfurt	Katia Plaschka; Andreas Scholl; Ulrich Cordes; Markus Flaig	
3 June 2012 Sacred Choral Music of the 20th and 21st centuries	Eric Whitacre; Jan Sandström; Samuel Barber; Morten Lauridsen; Andrew Carter; Knut Nystedt; Arvo Pärt; Graham Waterhouse; John Rutter; Franz Biebl	Lux Aurumque; Es ist ein Ros entsprungen; Sanctus; Agnus Dei; O Magnum Mysterium; Rejoice in the Lord alway; Immortal Bach; Da pacem domine; Salve Regina; Halleluja St. Martin; A Clare Benediction; Ave Maria	Chor St. Martin; Martinis		
29 September 2013	Bach	Mass in B minor (details)	Chor St. Martin; Martinis; L'arpa festante	Gabriela Eibenová; David Erler; Georg Poplutz; Andreas Pruys	
13 July 2014	Heinrich Schütz	Weib, was weinest du, SWV 443; Christ ist erstanden, SWV 470; Also hat Gott die Welt geliebt, SWV 380; Meine Seele erhebt den Herren, SWV 494; Cantate Domino, SWV 81; Jauchzet dem Herren, alle Welt, SWV 36; Danket dem Herrn, SWV 45	Chor St. Martin; Martinis; Barock-Consort St. Martin		
16 November 2014	Heinrich Schütz; Arvo Pärt	Selig sind die Toten; Also hat Gott die Welt geliebt; Da pacem domine	Chor St. Martin; Martinis; Barock-Consort St. Martin	Janina Moeller	
8 February 2015	Karl Jenkins	Te Deum; Palladio; Gloria	Carsten Koch: Chor St. Martin; Idsteiner Kantorei; Martinis; Nassauische Kammerphilharmonie		
15 November 2015	Gabriel Fauré; Olivier Latry	Cantique de Jean Racine; Requiem; Salve Regina	Chor St. Martin; Martinis; Nassauische Kammerphilharmonie	Yi Yang; Johannes Hill; Gabriel Dessauer (organ)	
16 April 2016	Haydn	Die Schöpfung	Carsten Koch: Chor St. Martin; Martinis; Idsteiner Kantorei; De Wase Kantorij; Nassauische Kammerphilharmonie	Susanne Völger; Christian Rathgeber; Johannes Hill	
6 November 2016 ; 29 January 2017	Peter Reulein	Laudato si' – Ein franziskanisches Magnificat (premiere)	Peter Reulein: Chor St. Martin; Martinis; Vocalensemble Liebfrauen; Cappuccinis; Ensemble Colorito	Marina Herrmann; Janina Moeller; Anna Metzen; André Khamasmie; Johannes Hill; Johannes Schröder (organ)	Limburg Cathedral (1); Frankfurt Cathedral (2)
16 September 2018 Abendlob	Stanford; Mozart; (Taizé); Wood; Rimski-Korsakov; Rheinberger	Jubilate; Ave verum corpus; "Adoramus te Christe"; Magnificat and Nunc dimittis in D; "Vater unser"; Abendlied	Chor St. Martin	Andreas Richter, organ	
8 December 2018 Weihnachts-Oratorium	J. S. Bach	Christmas Oratorio; I Jauchzet, frohlocket!; II Und es waren Hirten in derselben Gegend; III Herrscher des Himmels	Chor St. Martin; Martinis; Nassauische Kammerphilharmonie	Susanne Völger; Anne Bierwirth; Thomas Jacobs; Johannes Hill	Unionskirche
1 September 2019	Monteverdi	Vespro della Beata Vergine	Chor St. Martin; Martinis; Schola Cantorum Gallensis; Capella San Marco	Elisabeth Scholl; Lieselotte Fink; Christian Rohrbach; Mirko Ludwig; Fabian Kelly; Johannes Hill	
6 May 2023	Martín Palmeri; Peter Reulein	Misa a Buenos Aires; Te Deum	Carsten Koch: Idsteiner Kantorei; Chor St. Martin; Martinis; De Wase Kantorij; Nassauische Kammerphilharmonie	Lieselotte Fink; Helena Rüegg (bandoneon)	
26 November 2023	W. A. Mozart; Arvo Pärt	Requiem; Fratres, Da pacem Domine	Chor St. Martin; Martinis; Hessische Kammerphilharmonie	Annemarie Pfahler; Lieselotte Fink; Christian Rathgeber; Nicolas Ries	
5 May 2024	J. S. Bach	Bleib bei uns, denn es will Abend werden, BWV 6; Du Hirte Israel, höre, BWV 104; Lobet Gott in seinen Reichen, BWV 11; (Ascension Oratorio)	Chor St. Martin; Martinis; Nassau-Barock	Emilie Jønsson; Lieselotte Fink; Benedikt Kristjánsson; Johannes Hill	
14 September 2024	Haydn	Stabat Mater	Judith Kunz: Limburger Domchor; Mädchenkantorei Limburg; Chor St. Martin; Martinis; project singers; Domorchester	Marina Herrmann; Anne Bierwirth; Florian Wagner; Jonathan Macker	Limburg Cathedral
23 March 2025	Rheinberger; Pachelbel; Kuhnau/Bach; Pachelbel; Gounod; Johann Christoph Bach; Pachelbel	Kyrie; Tröste, tröste uns, Gott; Der Gerechte kömmt um; Singet dem Herrn; D'un cœur qui t'aime; Lieber Herr Gott, wecke uns auf; Nun danket alle Gott	Chor St. Martin; Martinis; Orchester St. Martin	Andreas Richter, organ; Sebastian Munsch, organ	
14 September 2025	Scarlatti; Haydn	Quartet No. 1 Stabat Mater	Chor St. Martin; Martinis; Classical ensemble	Elena Tsantidis; Lieselotte Fink; Erik Reinhardt; Nicolas Ries	
30 and 31 May 2026	Denis Bédard; Dan Forrest	Organ Concerto; Jubilate Deo	Carsten Koch: Chor St. Martin; Idsteiner Kantorei; Martinis; Nassauische Kammerphilharmonie	Gabriel Dessauer, organ; Cora Theobald, soprano; Larissa Botos, alto	
