= Anne Bierwirth =

German contralto

- Born: Unkel, West Germany
- Education: Folkwang Hochschule; Musikhochschule Frankfurt
- Occupation: Classical contralto

Anne Bierwirth is a German contralto, focused on concerts and recordings of sacred music, appearing internationally. Besides the standard repertoire such as Bach's Christmas Oratorio, she has explored rarely performed Baroque music such as Bach's St Mark Passion and Reinhard Keiser's Passion oratorio Der blutige und sterbende Christus.

== Career ==
Bierwirth was born in Unkel, where she grew up and received first singing lessons from the church musician K. Wester. She won the national competition Jugend musiziert in 1998. She then studied voice at the Folkwang Hochschule with Ulf Bästlein. She moved in 2001 to study voice and also historically informed performance at the Musikhochschule Frankfurt with Hedwig Fassbender. She also attended the opera class. From 2004, she studied with Heidrun Kordes, graduating in 2007 with a diploma. That summer, she appeared as Ottavia in Monteverdi's L'incoronazione di Poppea at the Theater Gießen. She appeared in concert with ensembles such as the Freiburger Vokalensemble and La Stagione Frankfurt, also touring internationally.

Bierwirth took part in a 2009 performance and live recording of cantatas by C. P. E. Bach, composed when he was director of music in Hamburg, with other soloists and the ensemble Les Amis de Philippe, conducted by Ludger Rémy. She performed all alto solos in Bach's St Matthew Passion in St. Martin, Idstein, alongside Ulrich Cordes as the Evangelist, Andreas Pruys as the vox Christi, soprano Katia Plaschka and bass Klaus Mertens that year, in a performance with period instruments. She sang the alto solo in Cantatas 4–6 of Bach's Christmas Oratorio at the Erlöserkirche, Bad Homburg, on 8 January 2011, with the church's Bach-Chor conducted by Susanne Rohn. She recorded church music by Zelenka in 2011 with the Marburger Bachchor, soloists Katia Plaschka, Christian Dietz and Markus Flaig, and the orchestra L'arpa festante conducted by Nicolo Sokoli. In 2013, she recorded a reconstructed version of Bach's St Mark Passion with the Knabenchor Hannover, conducted by Jörg Breiding, in 2013. In 2018, she took part in a performance and recording of the first German Passion oratorio, Reinhard Keiser's Der blutige und sterbende Christus, at the Bachfest Leipzig, conducted by Bernhard Klapprott.

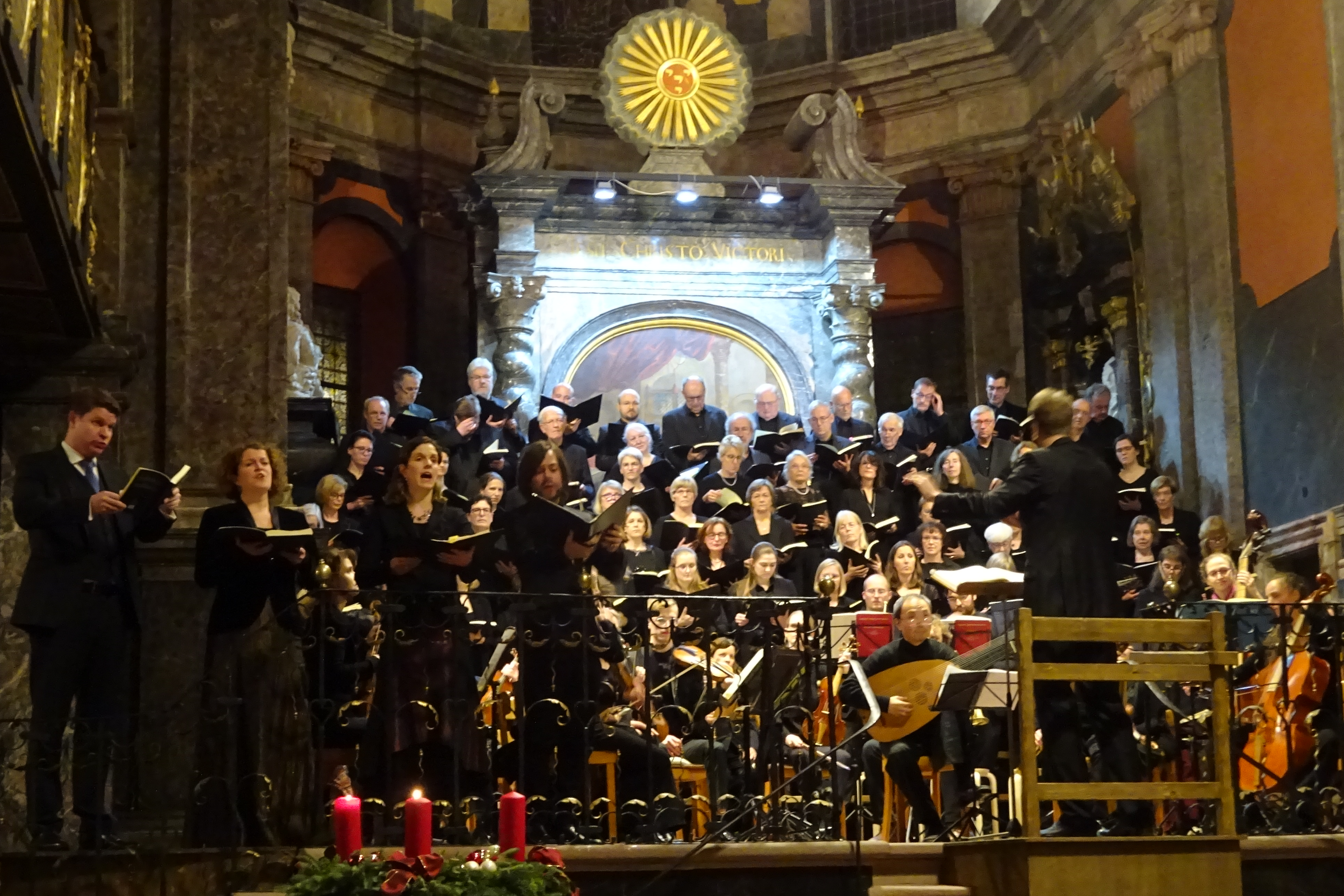
Bach: Christmas Oratorio at the Unionskirche, Idstein, 9 December 2018, Bierwirth second from left

In December 2018, she appeared as soloist in a complete performance of Bach's Christmas Oratorio at the Unionskirche, Idstein, with Thomas Jacobs as the Evangelist and Johannes Hill as the bass, the second evening conducted by Carsten Koch. Bierwirth has performed regularly with the ensembles Rheinische Kantorei and Das kleine Konzert conducted by Hermann Max, such as in 2019 in Bach cantatas at the Musikfest Stuttgart at the Stiftskirche, in Telemann's St Mark Passion and in Buxtehude's Das Jüngste Gericht (The Last Judgment) at Knechtsteden Abbey, in Hamburg in Telemann's Ode an Hamburg, Admiralitätsmusik and Wassermusik in a scenic performance, in Bach's motets Jesu, meine Freude and Ich lasse dich nicht and motets by Johann Michael Bach and Johann Christoph Bach at the Festival Alte Musik Knechtsteden, conducted by Edzard Burchard, and repeated at the Köthener Herbst festival.

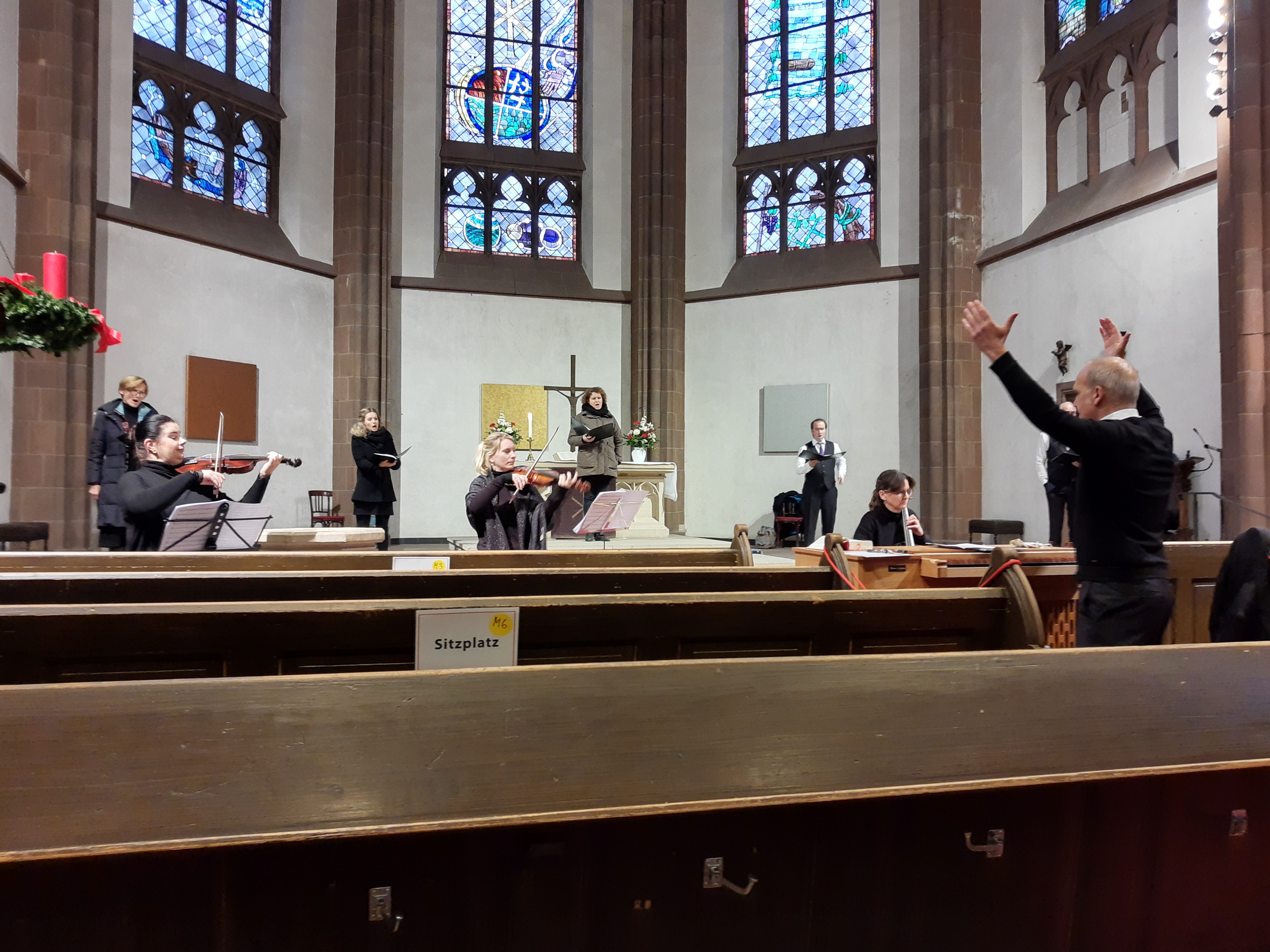
Cantata rehearsal at Dreikönigskirche, Frankfurt, 29 November 2020, Georg Böhm: Nun komm, der Heiden Heiland, Bierwirth in the centre

Bierwirth was planned as the soloist in an oratorio with light show at the Cologne Cathedral on 7 and 8 May 2020. The work Lux in Tenebris (Light in darkness), subtitled Ein Oratorium für den Frieden (An oratorio for peace) was composed by Helge Burggrabe for narrator, four soloists, choir, organ and orchestra. The concerts with live broadcast were meant to celebrate 75 years of peace after World War II. The performances, planned to be performed by the Cathedral choirs of Cologne, Berlin and Bruges conducted by Winfried Krane, were cancelled due to the COVID-19 pandemic. On 29 November 2020, she performed in a cantata service at the Dreikönigskirche, Frankfurt, in Georg Böhm's chorale cantata Nun komm, der Heiden Heiland with four other soloists and no choir due to the restrictions. She was a soloist in a Europe-wide broadcast of Christmas music on 20 December 2020, singing in a Christmas oratorio compiled from cantatas by Georg Philipp Telemann, and performed that day at the Cologne Trinitatiskirche conducted by Max.
