= Fabian Kelly =

German tenor

- Born: Speyer, Germany
- Education: Hochschule für Musik Mainz
- Occupations: Classical tenor; Choral conductor
- Website: www.kelly-tenor.de/vita/

Fabian Kelly is a German tenor and choral conductor. As a singer, he is most active in concert, including historically informed performances in works such as Monteverdi's Vespro della Beata Vergine and Handel's Messiah. He recorded a revival of Franz Ignaz Beck's opera L'isle déserte and Mozart's Requiem.

== Career ==
Born in Speyer, Kelly began his musical education with piano lessons from age 6, followed by instructions in organ playing, harmony and Tonsatz. At age 15, he joined the oratorio choir Liedertafel in Neustadt an der Weinstraße, also singing solo parts at times. He passed his Abitur in 2013, and then studied pedagogy of music and French at the University of Mainz. From 2016, he has studied opera and concert singing at the Hochschule für Musik Mainz with Andreas Karasiak, on a scholarship of the Fritz Wunderlich Foundation. He has taken part in an excellence program for historically informed performance, Barock Vokal.

Kelly made his stage debut in 2017 as Tamino in a production of Mozart's Die Zauberflöte for children by the Hochschule. He performed there also as Sellem in Stravinsky's The Rake's Progress.

He is a member of the vocal ensemble Vokalconsort Frankfurt, and a regular soloist for the Galluskonzerte at St. Gallus, Flörsheim. There, he performed in 2018 in an Advent concert of the Flörsheimer Kantorei, conducted by Franz Fink, including Part I of Handel's Messiah. A reviewer noted that his dramatic and expressive voice filled the church. On 1 September 2019, he performed the second tenor solo part in Monteverdi's Vespro della Beata Vergine at St. Martin, Idstein, conducted by Franz Fink, alongside soprano Elisabeth Scholl, tenor Mirko Ludwig and bass Johannes Hill. A reviewer credited the six soloists with perfect technique and harmony among their voices in the ensembles. On 3 October 2021, he sang the tenor solo in Rossini's Petite messe solennelle of Chor von St. Bonifatius in Wiesbaden, conducted by Roman Twardy.

Kelly is choral conductor of the choir Manual in Spiesheim. As a singer, he has performed internationally, including in Malta, London, Antwerp and Luxembourg.

== Recording ==
In 2019, Kelly was a soloist in a recording of Franz Ignaz Beck's opera L'isle déserte, performed by La Stagione Frankfurt conducted by Michael Schneider. A reviewer noted the singers' technically trained voices and natural expressiveness. He was the tenor soloist in a recording of Mozart's Requiem with the Gutenberg-Kammerchor and the Neumeyer Consort, conducted by Felix Koch, with soprano Chisa Tanigaki, alto Rebekka Stolz, and bass Christian Wagner.
