= Andreas Pruys =

German classical bass singer

- Born: Kleve, Germany
- Education: Folkwanghochschule
- Occupation: Classical bass singer
- Organization: NDR Chor

Andreas Pruys (born in Kleve) is a German classical bass singer.

== Professional career ==
Andreas Pruys studied singing and church music at the Folkwanghochschule in Essen. He worked as a church musician for several years, also as director of the music school in Emmerich. He has been a member of the choir NDR Chor since 2001.

Pruys has performed as a soloist in oratorio concerts, especially singing the words of Jesus in Bach's Passions. In 2007, he sang Bach's Mass in B minor in the Thomaskirche, Leipzig, the Kreuzkirche, Dresden, and the Franziskanerkirche Kraków. In 2008, he sang the words of Christ in Bach's St John Passion in the Philharmonie Luxembourg, with Christoph Prégardien as the Evangelist, Katharine Fuge, Robin Blaze, Peter Kooij, the choir Arsys Bourgogne and the Concerto Köln, conducted by Pierre Cao. He participated in the deSingel kunstcampus, Antwerp, in a concert including Nielsen's Sinfonia espansiva, conducted by Eivind Aadland. He sang in 2008 Beethoven's Mass in C major and Bruckner's Te Deum with the NDR Sinfonieorchester for the reopening of the new Mariendom in Hamburg. In 2009, he was the Vox Christi in the St Matthew Passion in St. Martin, Idstein, with Ulrich Cordes as the Evangelist, Katia Plaschka and Klaus Mertens. In 2009 Pruys performed Haydn's Die Schöpfung with Elisabeth Scholl, Daniel Sans and the Neue Rheingauer Kantorei in both the Rheingauer Dom in Geisenheim and the Basilika of Schloss Johannisberg. On Palm Sunday of 2010 he was the Voice of Christ in the St John Passion in the Cathedral of Trier. In November 2010, he was the bass soloist in Verdi's Messa da Requiem in St. Martin, Idstein.

In 1996, Andreas Pruys recorded Johann Rosenmüller's Vespro della beata Vergine as a member of the ensemble Canticum, with Cantus Cölln and Concerto Palatino, conducted by Konrad Junghänel. In 2010, he was involved in the project Robert Schumann: Sammlung von Musik-Stücken alter und neuer Zeit, which was initiated by Radio Bremen and resulted in a series of broadcasts and CDs. Artists such as Veronika Winter and Jan Kobow performed the 70 compositions which Schumann had added to the Neue Zeitschrift für Musik from 1838 to 1841.
