= Ulrich Cordes =

German tenor

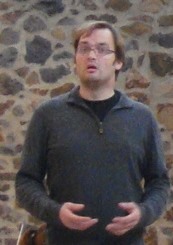
- In rehearsal, Behold and see from Handel's Messiah in St. Martin, Idstein, 2011
- Born: 1980 (age 45–46)
- Education: Hochschule für Musik Köln
- Occupation: Classical tenor
- Organization: Hochschule für Musik Würzburg

Ulrich Cordes (born 1980) is a German tenor, focused on concerts and sacred music.

== Career ==
Cordes first studied sacred music at the Hochschule für Musik Köln (A-Exam in 2003) with Winfried Bönig and Margaretha Hürholz, among others. He continued studying voice. In 2005 he was able to study at the CNSMDP in Paris with Pierre Mervant as a Socrates Fellow. From 2005 to 2006, he studied in Cologne with Christoph Prégardien. After his diploma in 2008, he took part in Prégardien's "voice studio", finishing with Konzertexamen (concert exam) in 2010. He took masterclasses with Claudia Visca and Konrad Jarnot. Since 2008 he has continued working with Jarnot. He was awarded a second prize in the competition "Podium Junger Gesangssolisten" of the Verband Deutscher Konzertchöre (VDKC) in 2008.

Cordes performed with the Netherlands Bach Society and the Münchener Bach-Chor, among others. On 10 October 2004, he sang the tenor part of Beethoven's Mass in C major in the Bonn Minster as part of the Beethovenfest. In 2007, he sang the part of Apollon in Monteverdi's L'Orfeo in a concert of the Rheingau Musik Festival. With the Johanneskantorei Düsseldorf he performed in 2008 Karl Jenkins' The Armed Man and in 2009 Mendelssohn's Paulus.

In 2008, his interpretation of the Evangelist in Bach's St John Passion in Cologne was termed "excellent, a factual witness showing empathy at times". He also performed the "great arias" in the two performances. In 2008, he sang the part of Uriel in several performances of Haydn's Die Schöpfung, in three churches of Berlin, in Bonn and in the Nikolaikirche. In 2009, he was the Evangelist in Bach's St Matthew Passion in St. Martin, Idstein, with Andreas Pruys (vox Christi), Katia Plaschka, Anne Bierwirth and Klaus Mertens. He performed several parts in Handel's Saul, the title role sung by Konrad Jarnot, with the Münchener Bach-Chor, conducted by Hansjörg Albrecht.

He was the tenor soloist in Voices of Exile, Richard Blackford's cantata for soloists, chamber orchestra, tape and choir, performed by the chamber choirs CONSONO and CONSTANT, conducted by Harald Jers, at the music festival "Klangvocal" (vocal sound) in Dortmund. In 2010, he performed at the Staatsoper Stuttgart in the German premiere of Elena Kats-Chernin opera The Rage of Life. His opera roles include Mozart's Don Ottavio and Belmonte. With the Münchener Bach-Chor he performed a program around Mozart's Requiem, including compositions of Enjott Schneider, in the Philharmonie at the Gasteig, stepping in for Thomas Michael Allen. He was the Evangelist in the St Matthew Passion in the Berliner Philharmonie on 28 March 2010. In 2011, he appeared in the Kölner Philharmonie in Handel's Israel in Egypt with the Bach-Verein Köln. He sang in Bach's Mass in B minor, performed in the Johanneskirche Düsseldorf and Trinitatiskirche Cologne to celebrate the 10th anniversary of the chamber choir CONSONO. He performed the tenor part of Handel's Messiah in St. Martin, Idstein, with Katia Plaschka, Andreas Scholl and Markus Flaig.

== Recordings ==
Cordes participated in a recording of Johann Mattheson's Christmas oratorio for soloists, chorus and orchestra Das größte Kind (The greatest child), conducted by Michael Willens, with the soloists also forming the choir.

In 2011, he was the Evangelist in a DVD of Bach's St Matthew Passion, recorded live at the Palais des Beaux-Arts, Brussels, with Graeme Danby (vox Christi), conducted by Bart Van Reyn.
