= Katia Plaschka =

German coloratura soprano

- Education: Musikhochschule Frankfurt
- Occupation: Coloratura soprano singer
- Organization: Balthasar-Neumann-Chor

Katia Plaschka is a German coloratura soprano who performs in opera, especially contemporary opera, and concert performances of oratorios.

== Career ==
Katia Plaschka studied voice at the Hochschule für Musik in Frankfurt until 2002 with Gunnel Tasch–Ohlsson. She also studied with Heidrun Kordes. In the field of historically informed performance she has collaborated with Thomas Hengelbrock, Frieder Bernius and Helmuth Rilling. She has participated in the Ohrwurm-Projekt, an educational music project aimed at elementary school children.

=== Opera ===
In 2001 she was the "high soprano" in music of Luigi Nono, in a concert performance in the "Zeitfluss" series at the Salzburg Festival of his Io, Frammento da Prometeo (Io, excerpts from Prometeo) for three sopranos, small chorus, bass flute, contrabass clarinet and live electronics (1981) that took place at the Kollegienkirche, Salzburg. The performance was recorded and released in 2004, at which time a reviewer wrote: "The singers are astonishing in their accuracy and tuning in these fiendishly difficult harmonies. Especially marvellous is the coloratura soprano Katia Plaschka." John Story commented in Fanfare:

The three sections involving the soloists are extraordinary in both their sublime if remote beauty and the sheer difficulty of the music. Katia Plaschka, quite accurately described as a high soprano, sings music of stratospheric difficulty accompanied first by the women’s voices and then the two instruments. Her ability to pull her extreme pitches out of what amounts to thin air is nothing short of amazing.

The recording was awarded the 2004 Preis der deutschen Schallplattenkritik in the choral works category.

Plaschka has been a soprano with the Wiener Taschenoper in Vienna, which specializes in contemporary opera. In 2003 she appeared in the premiere of Wolfgang Mitterer's opera massacre, performed as part of the Wiener Festwochen, directed by Joachim Schlömer and conducted by Peter Rundel. In 2004 she was the singer for Mitterer's performance with dancers, Labyrinth for soprano and electronics, at the Semper Depot in Vienna, with choreographer Saskia Hölbling and her group DANS.KIAS.

=== Concerts ===
Plaschka has performed numerous oratorios in concert. With the Marburg Bach Choir, she has performed Haydn's Stabat Mater (2004), Handels's Messiah (2005), and Bach's St John Passion. In 2003, with the Chor St. Martin and the chamber choir Martinis, she performed in the Unionskirche, Idstein, Handel's Gloria, which had been attributed to the composer only in 2001, and his Utrecht Te Deum and Jubilate. In St. Martin, also in Idstein, she performed Bach's Christmas Oratorio (2004), Buxtehude's Membra Jesu Nostri (2007), and Mozart's Great Mass in C minor (2008). In 2009, she performed there Bach's St Matthew Passion with Ulrich Cordes (Evangelist), Andreas Pruys (Vox Christi), and Klaus Mertens, and in 2011 she was the soprano in Handel's Messiah, with Andreas Scholl, Ulrich Cordes and Markus Flaig. Her voice was described as clear and light, and her "Rejoice greatly" and "I know that my Redeemer liveth" were considered highlights of the performance along with Scholl's "He was despised".

In 2005, Plaschka performed Monteverdi's Vespro della Beata Vergine with the Frankfurter Kantorei. With the Neue Rheingauer Kantorei she sang Poulenc's Gloria and John Rutter's Magnificat in the Rheingauer Dom in Geisenheim in 2007. In 2009 she performed Parts I–III of Bach's Christmas Oratorio in the Speyer Cathedral, conducted by Markus Melchiori, the cathedral's director of music.

=== Balthasar-Neumann-Chor ===
Katia Plaschka has been a regular member of Thomas Hengelbrock's Balthasar-Neumann-Chor. She performed among others Bach cantatas in the Konzerthaus Dortmund and Mozart's Idomeneo in the Barbican Centre.

== Recordings ==
- Luigi Nono: Io, frammento da Prometeo, Das atmende Klarsein. Katia Plaschka, Petra Hoffmann, Monika Bair-Ivenz, Roberto Fabbriciani, Ciro Scarponi; Solistenchor Freiburg, Experimentalstudio Freiburg, André Richard. col legno 2 SACD 20600 (Helikon Harmonia Mundi)
