= Markus Flaig =

German bass-baritone

- Born: 1971 (age 53–54); Horb am Neckar, Germany
- Education: Hochschule für Musik Frankfurt
- Occupation: Classical bass-baritone
- Awards: Johann Sebastian Bach Competition

Markus Flaig (born 1971) is a German bass-baritone who has focused on concerts and recordings of sacred music.

== Career ==
Markus Flaig was born in Horb am Neckar. He studied sacred music and school music, then voice with Beata Heuer-Christen in Freiburg and with Berthold Possemeyer at the Hochschule für Musik Frankfurt. Since 2006 he has worked with Carol Meyer-Bruetting. In 2004, he was awarded a prize at the international Johann Sebastian Bach Competition in Leipzig in the voice category.

Flaig has collaborated on Lieder with Jörg Schweinbenz. He premiered a cycle of orchestral songs, composed for him by Franz F. Kaern, based on poems by Thomas Bernhard.

He performed regularly with the Frankfurter Kantorei, conducted by Winfried Toll, in 2001 singing Handel's Dixit Dominus in the Sendesaal concert hall of the Hessischer Rundfunk, in 2006 Bach's Mass in B minor in the Heiliggeistkirche of the Dominican Monastery (Frankfurt am Main), and in 2010 Handel's Messiah in the Alte Oper. On 3 April 2009, in Tel Aviv, in a concert commemorating the hundredth anniversary of the foundation of the city, he sang with the Israel Chamber Orchestra in a Mann Auditorium performance of Mozart's Requiem and Mendelssohn's Die erste Walpurgisnacht.

Flaig has performed regularly with the Rheinische Kantorei, conducted by Hermann Max. In 2008 they performed programs around Bach's short Masses at the Bachfest Leipzig in the Nikolaikirche, at the Wartburgkonzerte Eisenach and at the Musikwochen Weserbergland, with Veronika Winter, Henning Voss and Jan Kobow. In 2009 he sang Bach's complete Christmas Oratorio. In 2010, he performed at the Tonhalle Düsseldorf the bass arias of Bach's St John Passion, in the arrangement of Robert Schumann. At that year's Rheingau Musik Festival he sang in Eberbach Abbey Haydn's Stabat Mater and Mozart's Coronation Mass.

In 2004, he was the vox Christi in Bach's St John Passion, alongside Werner Güra's Evangelist, in concerts with the Camerata Vocale Freiburg, conducted by Toll, in the Konzerthaus of Freiburg and the Lucerne Culture and Congress Centre, among others.

In 2008, he sang the part of Jesus in Hugo Distler's chorale Passion Choralpassion op. 7, with the Kurt-Thomas Kammerchor in three concerts in and around Frankfurt to celebrate the centenary of Distler's birth in 1908.

In 2011, he performed the bass part in Handel's Messiah in St. Martin, Idstein, with Katia Plaschka, Andreas Scholl and Ulrich Cordes. His voice, referring to "The people that walked in darkness have seen a great light", was described as excelling with a depth touching upon blackness, anchored in a bright altitude.

== Recordings ==
Flaig has recorded solo cantatas by Bach, Telemann and Graupner. He recorded Johann Caspar Kerll's Missa superba with Thomas Hengelbrock, Bach's Mass in B minor with Tobias Hiller and his cantata Du Hirte Israel, höre, BWV 104, and the bass arias of the St Matthew Passion with Martin Lutz, the Schiersteiner Kantorei and Evangelist Christoph Prégardien. He recorded Bach's Christmas Oratorio with Hermann Max, Handel's Brockes Passion, HWV 48, with Peter Neumann, and the St Mark Passion of Friedrich Nicolaus Bruhns with Ralf Popken. He participated in a project to record Schubert's Part-Songs, works for multiple voices, with the singers Sibylla Rubens, Silke Schwarz, Regina Jakobi, Ingeborg Danz, Hildegard Wiedemann, Markus Schäfer, Marcus Ullmann, Thomas E. Bauer, Marcus Schmidl, and the pianist Ulrich Eisenlohr.
