= Elisabeth Scholl =

German soprano and academic teacher

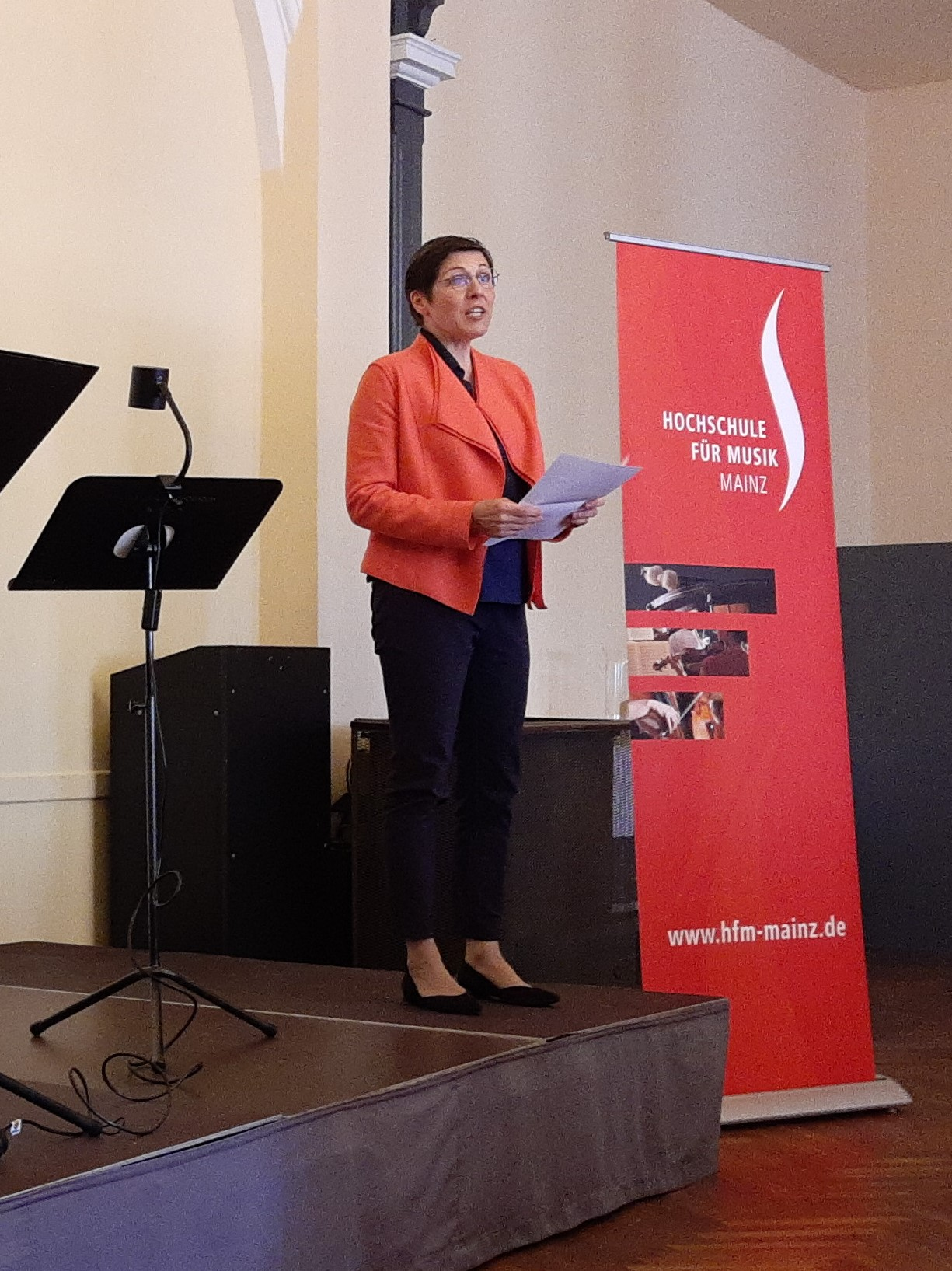
- Scholl opening a prize winner's concert, 2023
- Born: 1966 (age 59–60); Kiedrich, Hesse, Germany
- Education: Hochschule für Musik Mainz; Schola Cantorum Basiliensis
- Occupations: Soprano; Voice teacher
- Organizations: Hochschule für Musik Nürnberg; Hochschule für Musik Mainz
- Relatives: Andreas Scholl, brother

Elisabeth Scholl (born 1966 in Kiedrich) is a German soprano and academic teacher.

== Career ==
Elisabeth Scholl was the first girl to sing with the boys choir Kiedricher Chorbuben. From 1982 to 1987 she sang the role of the First Boy in Mozart's Die Zauberflöte at the Hessisches Staatstheater Wiesbaden. After her Abitur she studied musicology, English studies and history of art at the Johannes Gutenberg-Universität Mainz and took private singing lessons with Eduard Wollitz. She continued her studies at the Schola Cantorum Basiliensis with René Jacobs and Richard Levitt and attended master classes with Ingrid Bjoner, Helmut Deutsch, Luisa Bosabalian, Ileana Cotrubas and Dietrich Fischer-Dieskau. She has collaborated with ensembles such as Freiburger Barockorchester, Akademie für Alte Musik Berlin, Concerto Köln, and Cantus Cölln.

Elisabeth Scholl has appeared at European festivals, such as the Schleswig-Holstein Musik Festival, Rheingau Musik Festival, Lucerne Festival, Festival van Vlaanderen, Handel Festival, Halle, Handel Festival Göttingen, Handel Festival Karlsruhe, and The Proms. She has collaborated with conductors such as René Jacobs, Jos van Immerseel, Frieder Bernius, Enoch zu Guttenberg, Bruno Weil, Nicholas McGegan and Neville Marriner.

She has appeared with local choirs of the Rhein Main area. In 1998 she sang with her brother Andreas Scholl in Bach's St Matthew Passion in St. Martin, Idstein, with Max Ciolek as the Evangelist and Max van Egmond as the Vox Christi In 2008 she appeared there as soprano II in Mozart's Great Mass in C minor, along with Katia Plaschka as soprano I. In 2009 she was the soprano soloist (Gabriel, Eve) in Haydn's Die Schöpfung with Daniel Sans (Uriel), Andreas Pruys (Raphael, Adam) and the Neue Rheingauer Kantorei in the Basilika of Schloss Johannisberg. In 2010 she sang with her brother in Handel's Messiah in the Marktkirche, Wiesbaden, with Andreas Karasiak and the Wiesbadener Knabenchor.

Since 2009 she has been a teacher of Baroque singing at the Hochschule für Musik Nürnberg. From 2018, she has also been professor of voice at the Hochschule für Musik Mainz.

== Recordings ==
- Alessandro Grandi: Vulnerasti cor meum: Sacred music by Alessandro Grandi, Schola Cantorum Basiliensis (Elisabeth Scholl, María Cristina Kiehr, René Jacobs, Andreas Scholl, Gerd Türk, Otto Rastbichler, Ulrich Messthaler), conductor René Jacobs, (Deutsche Harmonia Mundi) 1991
- Handel: Athalia, Elisabeth Scholl (Athalia), Junge Kantorei, Barockorchester Frankfurt, Joachim Carlos Martini (Naxos) 1996
- Bach: Christmas Oratorio, Evangelist: Christoph Prégardien, Caterina Calvi, Werner Van Mechelen, La Petite Bande, conductor Sigiswald Kuijken, (Columbia Music Entertainment) 1997
- Handel: Deborah, Junge Kantorei, Barockorchester Frankfurt, Joachim Carlos Martini (Naxos) 1999
- Bach: Christmas Oratorio, Evangelist: Jan Kobow, Gerhild Romberger, Sebastian Noack, Knabenchor Hannover, Akademie für Alte Musik Berlin & Barockorchester L'ARCO, conductor Heinz Hennig, (Studio Wedemark) 1999
- Von Goethe inspiriert – Lieder von Komponistinnen des 18. und 19. Jahrhunderts, Burkhard Schaeffer (piano) (SALTO) 1999
- Bach: St Matthew Passion, Evangelist: Gerd Türk, Vox Christi: Hanno Müller-Brachmann, Nathalie Stutzmann, Andreas Karasiak, Thomas Mohr, Knabenchor Hannover & Thomanerchor Leipzig (direction: Georg Christoph Biller), Akademie für Alte Musik Berlin & Barockorchester L'ARCO, conductor Heinz Hennig, (Thorofon) 2000
- Reinhard Keiser: Opera Arias and Instrumental Works, La Ricordanza (DG) 2001
- Johann Christian Bach: Magnificat und Tantum ergo, La Stagione Frankfurt, Dresdner Kammerchor, Michael Schneider (Capriccio Records) 2002
- Alessandro Scarlatti: Inferno – Cantate drammatiche, Modo Antiquo (cpo) 2006
- Giovanni Battista Ferrandini: Cantate per Passione, Echo di Danube (Accent) 2006
- Bach: St John Passion, arranged by Robert Schumann, Evangelist: Jan Kobow, Veronika Winter, Gerhild Romberger, Ekkehard Abele, Rheinische Kantorei, conductor Hermann Max, (Cpo) 2007
