= Mirko Ludwig =

German tenor

- Born: Hamburg
- Education: Hochschule für Künste Bremen
- Occupation: Operatic tenor
- Organization: Quartonal
- Website: mirkoludwig.com/vita

Mirko Ludwig is a German tenor who is mostly active in concert, especially in historically informed performance. He is a member of the vocal quartet Quartonal.

== Career ==
Born in Hamburg, Ludwig was from grade three a member of the boys' choir Chorknaben Uetersen. He studied voice at the University of the Arts Bremen with Thomas Mohr and Krisztina Laki, with a focus on historically informed performance.

In 2012, Ludwig appeared at the Laeiszhalle in Hamburg with the Franz-Schubert-Chor in a program combining Schubert's Mass No. 2 in G major with Dona nobis pacem by Pēteris Vasks and Martín Palmeri's Misa a Buenos Aires (or Misatango). He has performed the tenor part in Bach's St John Passion, both Evangelist and arias, for example at St. Nikolai in 2016, conducted by Volkmar Zehner. A review noted that he used his bright and agile tenor voice for an intense dramatic narration. He appeared in the opening concert of the Elbphilharmonie in Hamburg in 2017 with a vocal quintet called Ensemble Praetorius, founded for the occasion. In 2019, he appeared as a soloist with the Balthasar-Neumann-Chor und -Ensemble conducted by Thomas Hengelbrock at the Kölner Philharmonie, performing Schumann's Missa Sacra. He performed the first tenor solo part in Monteverdi's Vespro della Beata Vergine at St. Martin, Idstein, conducted by Franz Fink, alongside soprano Elisabeth Scholl and bass Johannes Hill. A reviewer credited the six soloists with perfect technique and harmony among their voices in the ensembles.

Ludwig is a member of the vocal quartet Quartonal. Founded in 2006, they won first prize at the 2010 Deutscher Chorwettbewerb.
