= Magnificat and Nunc dimittis in D (Wood) =

1898 choral setting of Magnificat and Nunc dimittis

- Sacred choral music by Charles Wood
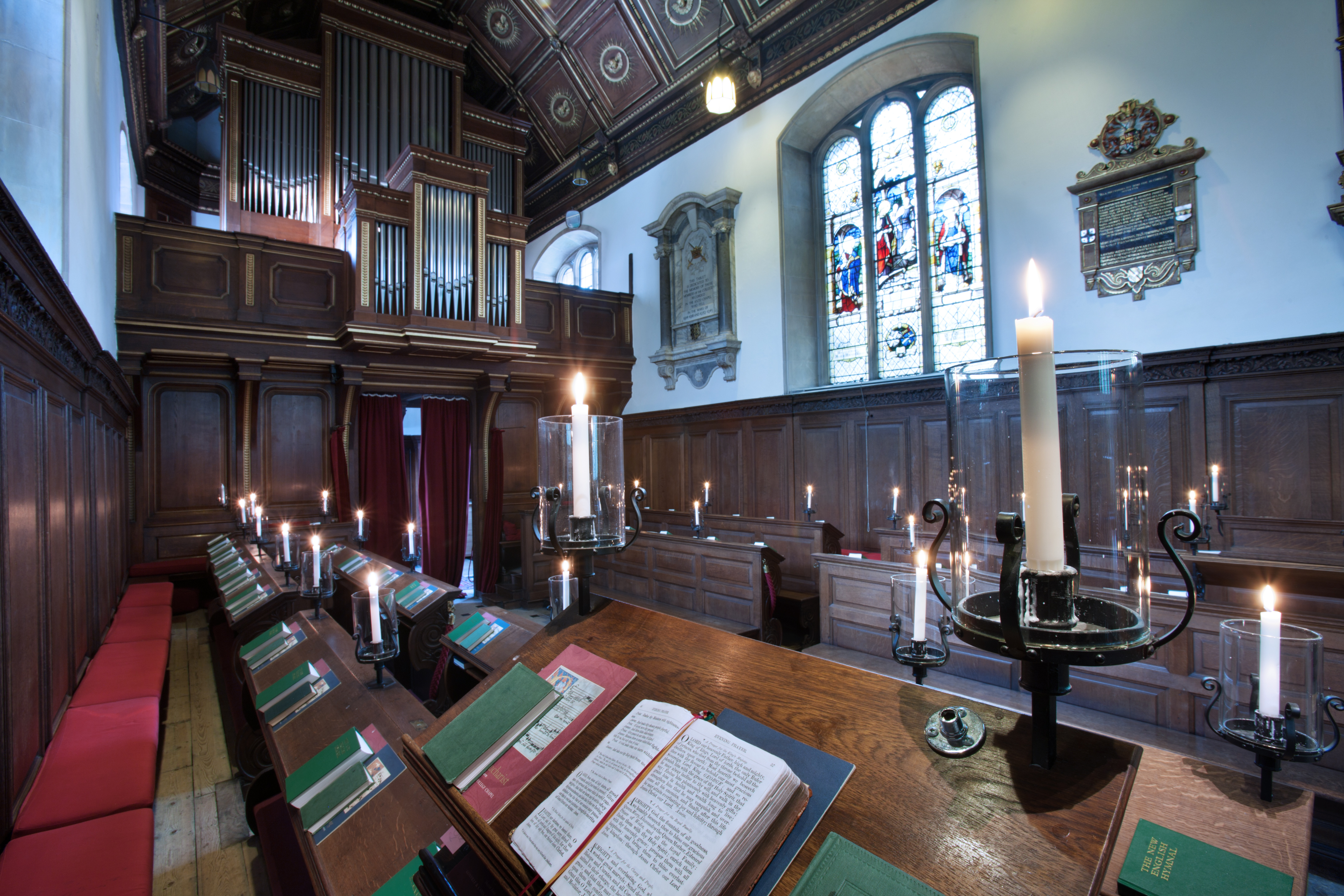
- Chapel at the Gonville and Caius College, Cambridge, where Wood was organist
- Other name: Evening Service in D major
- Text: Magnificat; Nunc dimittis
- Language: English
- Composed: 1898

Magnificat and Nunc dimittis in D is a choral setting by the Irish composer Charles Wood of the Magnificat and Nunc dimittis for the Anglican service of Evening Prayer. Scored for four-part choir and organ, it was written in 1898. It is also known as Evening Service in D major.

== History ==
Wood won an organ scholarship to the University of Cambridge where he became the organist at Caius and, later, a fellow of the college, having graduated with a doctorate in music. He set the combination of Magnificat and Nunc dimittis several times for the Evening Prayer of the Anglican Church, taking the words from the Book of Common Prayer. Evensong is a traditional daily service combining elements of vespers and compline. Wood's setting in D is his earliest, and has been regarded as his most popular version of the canticles. It has been said, together with the Evening Service in B-flat by Stanford, to mean for many "the epitome of Church of England worship".

== Text ==
Magnificat (Song of Mary) and Nunc dimittis (Song of Simeon) are biblical canticles. Mary sings the Magnificat ("My soul doth magnify the Lord") on the occasion of her visit to Elizabeth, as narrated in the Gospel of Luke (Luke 1:39–56). Simeon sings the Nunc dimittis ("Lord, now lettest thou thy servant depart in peace") when Jesus is presented in the temple (Luke 2:29–32). Each canticle is concluded by a doxology. The canticles are part of the daily service of Evening Prayer in the Anglican church and have been set to music often.

== Music ==
Wood set the text for a four-part choir and organ. He set each canticle as one movement. Both are concluded by the same doxology. The Magnificat is in common time, marked Allegro. All voices begin in unison with a slow rising scale in halfnotes, beginning with D. For "and my spirit has rejoiced", they move in lively rhythm, calming to the halfnotes for "in God, my saviour". With similar attention to detail, Wood set the words, with the choir often in homophony. Polyphony is reserved for the doxology "Glory be to the father".

In the Nunc dimittis, set in triple meter and marked Adagio, the basses alone sing most of the canticle text of the old Simeon. After the first line, the upper voices echo the text "Lord, now lettest Thou Thy servant depart in peace" in homophony. After the second line, the upper voices repeat their first echo, but now in E major. After the third line, the upper voices repeat the last words, "Thy people Israel", ending in A major, and followed by the doxology.

== Recording ==
The evening service was recorded in volume 11 of a series of Magnificat and Nunc Dimittis, with eight other settings of the canticles, all sung by the St Edmundsbury Cathedral Choir conducted by Mervyn Cousins, with organist Scott Farrell.
