= Klaus Mertens =

German bass and bass-baritone singer

- Born: 25 March 1949 (age 77); Kleve, Germany
- Occupations: Classical bass and bass-baritone singer

Klaus Mertens (born 25 March 1949, in Kleve) is a German bass and bass-baritone singer who is known especially for his interpretation of the complete works of Johann Sebastian Bach for bass voice.

== Career ==
Klaus Mertens took singing lessons while attending school. He studied music and pedagogy, and had his vocal training with Else Bischof-Bornes and Jakob Stämpfli (song, concert, oratorio) and with Peter Massmann (opera). After graduating with distinction he worked first as a school teacher.

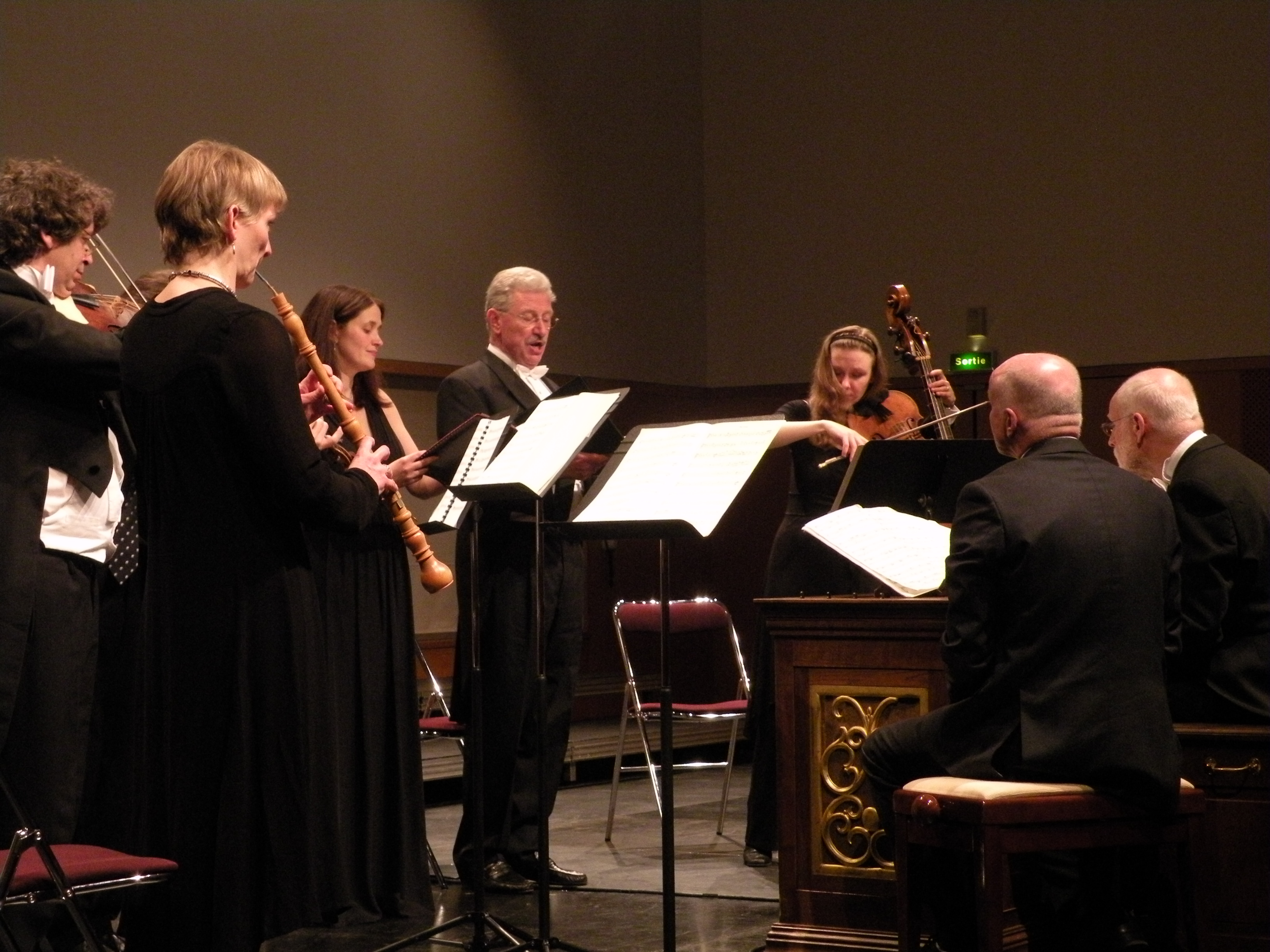
Mertens (centre) with the Amsterdam Baroque Orchestra and Ton Koopman (right)

In the field of historically informed performance, Klaus Mertens has worked with Frans Brüggen, Philippe Herreweghe, René Jacobs, Sigiswald Kuijken, Gustav Leonhardt and Nikolaus Harnoncourt. With various conductors he recorded the works of Bach, not only the Passions and oratorios, but also the cantatas, which number around 200. Mertens took bass solo work in all parts of the project to make the first CD recording of the complete vocal works of J. S. Bach, with the Amsterdam Baroque Orchestra & Choir conducted by Ton Koopman. This project, begun in 1994, took ten years to complete with various soloists in the other vocal parts, and included concert tours in Europe, America and Japan. Reviewer George Chien wrote for Fanfare: "In a remarkable display of stamina and consistency, Klaus Mertens sang in every piece that required a bass soloist, 190 in all." He is also involved in the project Dieterich Buxtehude – Opera Omnia of the same ensemble to record the complete works of Dieterich Buxtehude, begun in 2005.

As a singer of lieder, he has interpreted songs of Claudio Monteverdi, Antonio Caldara, Wolfgang Amadeus Mozart and Franz Schubert among others. He has performed the title roles of the romantic oratorios Elijah and St. Paul by Mendelssohn and, as music of the 20th century, Paul Hindemith's Requiem and Igor Stravinsky's Oedipus rex. In the classical repertory he has performed with such conductors as Herbert Blomstedt, Roger Norrington, Peter Schreier, Hans Vonk, Christian Zacharias, Edo de Waart and Iván Fischer; and with orchestras including the Berlin Philharmonic, Royal Concertgebouw Orchestra, Rotterdam Philharmonic Orchestra, Leipzig Gewandhaus Orchestra, Dresden Philharmonic, Tonhalle-Orchester Zürich, St. Louis Symphony Orchestra and Chicago Symphony Orchestra.

A performance of Gustav Mahler's Kindertotenlieder with the Tokyo Metropolitan Symphony Orchestra under Gary Bertini in 2002 was recorded. In 2005 he performed in the Berliner Philharmonie the Mass in F minor of Anton Bruckner conducted by Kent Nagano. With the Thomanerchor he appeared in the Christmas Oratorio of Bach who had conducted the group in its first performance in 1734. Thomaskantor Georg Christoph Biller directed a recording of Bach's Mass in B minor in 2006. Mertens has also collaborated with the Windsbacher Knabenchor and the Dresdner Kreuzchor performing in the Kreuzkirche as well as in the Frauenkirche. In 2009 he sang the bass part in the St Matthew Passion in St. Martin, Idstein, with Ulrich Cordes as the Evangelist and Andreas Pruys. He performed Bach's cantata Ich will den Kreuzstab gerne tragen, BWV 56, in Wiesbaden and in the Alte Oper Frankfurt, programmed in contrast to Shostakovich's Symphony Babi Jar, conducted by Enoch zu Guttenberg. He performed the Vox Christi, the words of Jesus, and the bass arias in Bach's Johannespassion in a concert on 27 February 2010 in Munich with Mark Padmore (Evangelist and arias), Johannette Zomer, Andreas Scholl, Chor des Bayerischen Rundfunks, Symphonieorchester des Bayerischen Rundfunks, Ton Koopman conducting. He performed the part of Valens in Handel's oratorio Theodora in Eberbach Abbey in 2010. He was bass soloist for two concerts of the Bachchor Mainz reviving church cantatas of Wilhelm Friedemann Bach in June 2010, remembering the composer's birth in 1710.

Mertens has regularly appeared at international music festivals such as the Prague Spring International Music Festival, Maggio Musicale Fiorentino, Festival d'Aix-en-Provence and the Salzburg Festival. In 2006 he sang the bass part of Bach's St Matthew Passion, conducted by Enoch zu Guttenberg, at the Rheingau Musik Festival. With the same ensemble he appeared in 2009 at the 12th Beijing Music Festival in major works of Joseph Haydn, The Creation, the Nelson Mass and The Seasons.

== Awards ==
- 2019 Bach Medal

== Recordings ==
As of 2009, the discography of Mertens contains more than 140 CDs and DVDs.

Selected recordings of unusual repertoire:

- Marc-Antoine Charpentier: Motets for double Chorus, H.403, H.404, H.135, H.136, H.137, H.392, H.410, H.167, 1992, Barbara Schlick, The Amsterdam Baroque Orchestra conducted by Ton Koopman. 2 CD Erato 1992
- Othmar Schoeck: Elegie op. 36, with Mutare Ensemble, Gerhard Müller-Hornbach, NCA, 1993/2008
- Max Reger: 24 Geistliche Lieder (including 12 sacred songs op. 137), with Martin Haselböck (organ), 2000, NCA
- Christoph Graupner: 3 Bass-Kantaten with Accademia Daniel, 2002, hr-musik (in German)
- Georg Philipp Telemann: 47 Generalbass-Lieder, with Ludger Rémy (harpsichord), 2004, jpc
- Schubert: Winterreise, with Tini Mathot (fortepiano) 2005, Antoine Marchand CC 72152, review Göran Forsling 2006
- Telemann: Cantatas For Bass Voice, with il Gardellino, 2007, ArkivMusic review Brian Robins in Fanfare
- Johann Pachelbel: Arien & Concerti, with Emma Kirkby, Kai Wessel, Jan Kobow, London Baroque, 2007, Cavalli Records CCD 332 review Steven Plank in Opera Today
- Gustav Mahler: Lieder Cycles arranged for Chamber Ensemble, with Mutare Ensemble, Gerhard Müller-Hornbach, NCA
