= Andreas Scholl =

German countertenor

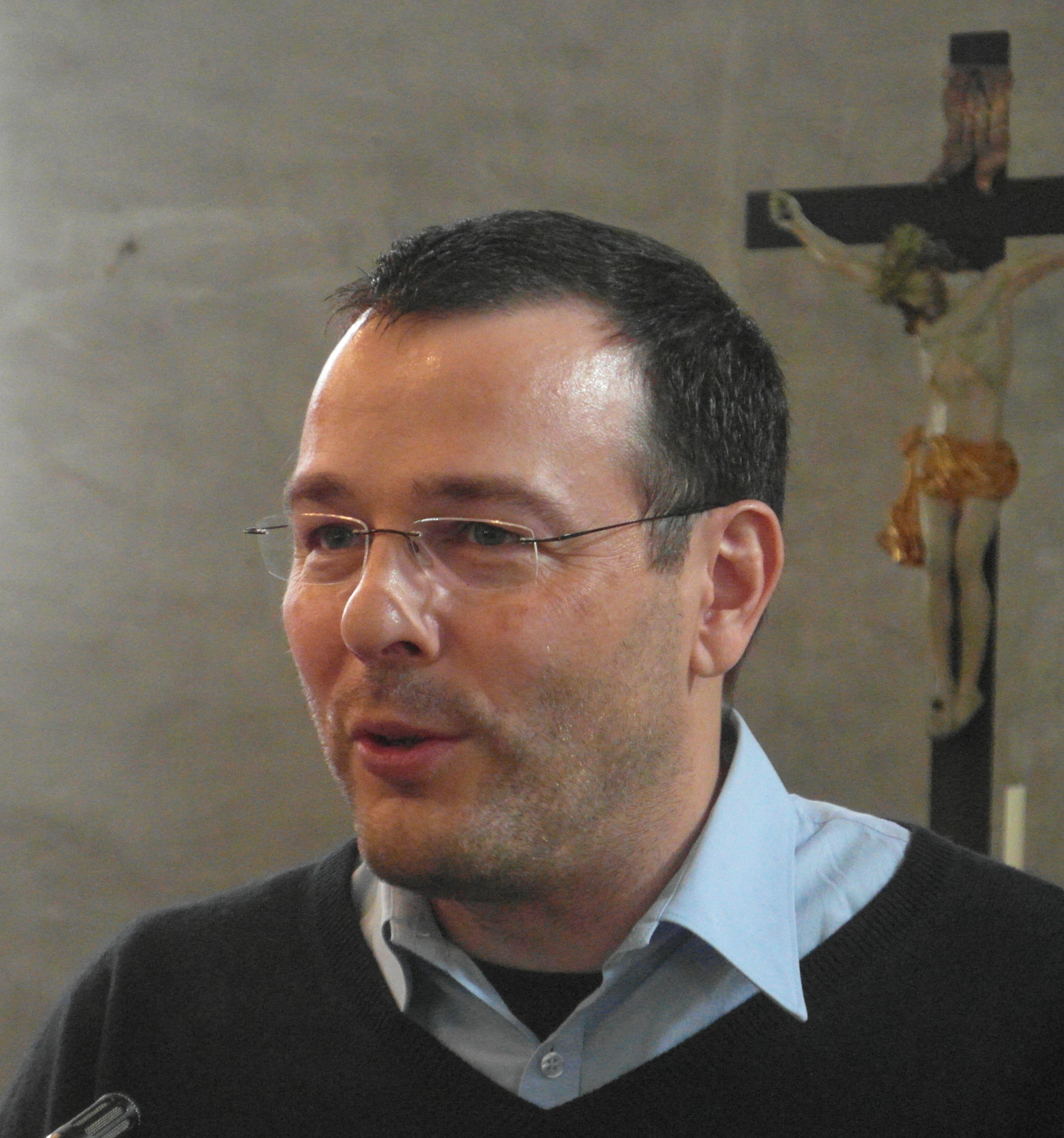
- The singer in 2013
- Born: 10 November 1967 (age 57); Eltville, Germany
- Education: Schola Cantorum Basiliensis with René Jacobs
- Occupations: Countertenor; Academic voice teacher
- Spouse: Tamar Halperin
- Relatives: sister Elisabeth Scholl, soprano
- Awards: Rheingau Musik Preis

Andreas Scholl (born 10 November 1967) is a German countertenor, a male classical singer in the alto vocal range, specialising in Baroque music.

Born into a family of singers, Scholl was enrolled at the age of seven into the Kiedricher Chorbuben boys choir. Aged 13, he was chosen from 20,000 choristers gathered in Rome from around the world to sing solo at a Mass held on 4 January 1981. Just four years later, Scholl was offered a place at the Schola Cantorum Basiliensis, an institution that normally accepts only post-graduate students, based on the strength and quality of his voice. He became an instructor at the Schola Cantorum Basiliensis in Switzerland, succeeding his own teacher, Richard Levitt. Since October 2019, he has been a professor at the Universität Mozarteum in Salzburg, Austria. This is his only position as a teacher now.

Scholl's early operatic roles include his standing in for René Jacobs in 1993 at the Théâtre Grévin in Paris, where he caused a sensation. His major roles, such as his debut at Glyndebourne in 1998 as Bertarido in Handel's Rodelinda, a role he reprised at the Metropolitan Opera in 2006, were written for the 18th-century alto castrato Senesino.

The bulk of Scholl's recording career has been with Harmonia Mundi and Decca, and his CDs are among Harmonia Mundi's best sellers. He has worked with most contemporary Baroque specialists, including William Christie and Philippe Herreweghe, and is himself a songwriter and composer of ballet and theatre music, with his own professional sound studio.

== Biography ==
=== Childhood ===
Scholl was born on 10 November 1967 in Eltville, West Germany, and grew up in neighbouring Kiedrich. His entire family were singers, and he was enrolled at the age of seven into the Kiedricher Chorbuben, a boys' choir first documented in 1333. Aged 13, Scholl performed the role of the "second boy" in Mozart's Die Zauberflöte at the Hessisches Staatstheater Wiesbaden, while his sister Elisabeth sang the first boy. That same year he was one of 20,000 choristers from all over the world gathered in Rome for a festival, and was chosen to sing solo at Mass on 4 January 1981, where he met Pope John Paul II. Along with his fellow choristers of the Kiedricher Chorbuben, Scholl was an extra in the film The Name of the Rose, playing a young monk standing alongside Sean Connery in scenes shot at Eberbach Abbey, near Kiedrich.

Scholl lists his musical heroes as Howard Jones, OMD, New Order and the Pet Shop Boys.

=== Musical education ===
Scholl was 17 when the extent of his ability was recognised by the voice coach of the Chorbuben from the Darmstadt Music Academy. Scholl then sang for the tenor/countertenor Herbert Klein, who advised him that there were only two places he should study: in London or at the early music conservatoire in Basel, the Schola Cantorum Basiliensis. Since an uncle had introduced Scholl to the voices of Paul Esswood and James Bowman, the leading European countertenors of the day, Scholl chose Bowman as a role model. Scholl sent a demo tape to René Jacobs to evaluate his talent. This resulted in Jacobs inviting Scholl to visit the Schola Cantorum Basiliensis. Although the Schola Cantorum Basiliensis only offered post-graduate courses, and Scholl had no first degree, he was offered a place on the strength and quality of his voice after singing a Schubert song for the admissions board, which included René Jacobs.

At the Schola, Andreas Scholl's teacher was Richard Levitt, followed by Jacobs in his second year. Violinist Chiara Banchini and soprano Emma Kirkby were major influences, as Scholl began to specialise in the music of the Baroque. Scholl additionally studied with soprano Evelyn Tubb and lutenist Anthony Rooley. In addition to the Diploma of Ancient Music, for which his external examiner was James Bowman, Andreas Scholl garnered prizes from the Council of Europe and the Claude Nicolas Ledoux Foundation, and awards from Switzerland's Association Migros and Ernst Göhner Foundation.

Andreas Scholl has been teaching interpretation in the Schola Cantorum Basiliensis, succeeding his own teacher, Richard Levitt, and is in much demand for master classes.

== Career ==
=== Early performances ===
In 1988 Scholl performed Bach's Christmas Oratorio in Rüdesheim. In 1991 he appeared in Bach's St John Passion, conducted by Philippe Herreweghe in Antwerp. In January 1993 Scholl stood in for René Jacobs at Jacobs' request at the Théâtre Grévin in Paris, causing a sensation. Scholl's partner that night was the harpsichordist Markus Märkl, who became his constant musical counterpart in the following years. A later performance of Bach's St John Passion was broadcast on Good Friday to a radio audience which included William Christie. Shortly thereafter, Christie and Scholl met on a train. The 1994 recording of Handel's Messiah with Les Arts Florissants resulted directly from this meeting.

Scholl performed Bach's Mass in B minor in 1995, conducted by Jacobs, and sang works by Purcell on a tour in France. In 1998 Scholl and his sister performed in Bach's St Matthew Passion, with Max Ciolek as the Evangelist and Max van Egmond as the vox Christi, in St. Martin, Idstein. Scholl performed the title role of Handel's Solomon at The Proms. He gave recitals in Wigmore Hall and at the Brighton Festival.

=== Opera ===
Scholl's major operatic roles were written for the 18th-century alto castrato Senesino. They include his debut at Glyndebourne in 1998, performing the part of Bertarido in Handel's Rodelinda opposite Anna Caterina Antonacci in the title role, repeated in 1999 and 2002. Rodelinda was a huge success and Scholl "stopped the show" according to the Sunday Times. James Bowman, who described himself as an unqualified admirer, reported that "people went into a kind of trance" when he sang Dove Sei. The Financial Times said of his Vivi tiranno: "such intelligent virtuosity ... time stands still and you feel he is speaking to you." In February 2002, Le Monde called him "Le Roi Scholl" after his reprise of the role of Bertarido in the Paris production of the Glyndebourne Rodelinda.

Scholl performed this role also at the Metropolitan Opera in 2006, opposite Renée Fleming in the title role and Kobie van Rensburg, conducted by Patrick Summers, repeated in 2011. He performed the title role in Handel's Giulio Cesare in a Royal Danish Opera production in 2002 and 2005), reprised in Paris (2007) and Lausanne (2008). In 2008 he performed the role of Arsace in Handel's Partenope for the Royal Danish Opera. In 2010 he sang Giulio Cesare, this time opposite Cecilia Bartoli as Cleopatra, with Les Arts Florissants conducted by Christie.

=== Concerts ===
In 1999, Scholl appeared with the Netherlands Bach Society, conducted by Jos van Veldhoven in works of Bach, including his Missa in G (BWV 236). He performed Bach's Christmas Oratorio in Avery Fisher Hall, conducted by Ton Koopman. In 2000 he gave several concerts of Bach's Mass in B minor in Japan, conducted by Masaaki Suzuki. In 2001, Scholl sang in Handel's Saul in Brussels and performed the title role in Handel's Solomon, conducted by Paul McCreesh. He sang Bach's St John Passion in the Thomaskirche, Leipzig. At the Bachfest Leipzig 2003, he sang in the Mass in B minor, which traditionally closes the festival, with Letizia Scherrer, Mark Padmore and Sebastian Noack, choir and orchestra of the Collegium Vocale Gent, conducted by Herreweghe. In 2006 he sang on a tour of Europa Bach's solo cantatas Vergnügte Ruh, beliebte Seelenlust, BWV 170, and Geist und Seele wird verwirret, BWV 35, with the orchestra Accademia Bizantina. In 2007 he performed the title role of Saul again, at Eberbach Abbey with Trine Wilsberg Lund (Merab), Hannah Morrison (Michal), Andreas Karasiak (Jonathan) and the Schiersteiner Kantorei, conducted by Martin Lutz. In the Berliner Philharmonie he sang Handel's Messiah with soloists of the Tölzer Knabenchor, the choir of Les Arts Florissants and the Berlin Philharmonic, conducted by Christie. In 2008 Andreas Scholl made his debut with the New York Philharmonic, singing Handel's Messiah in Avery Fisher Hall, conducted by Ton Koopman.

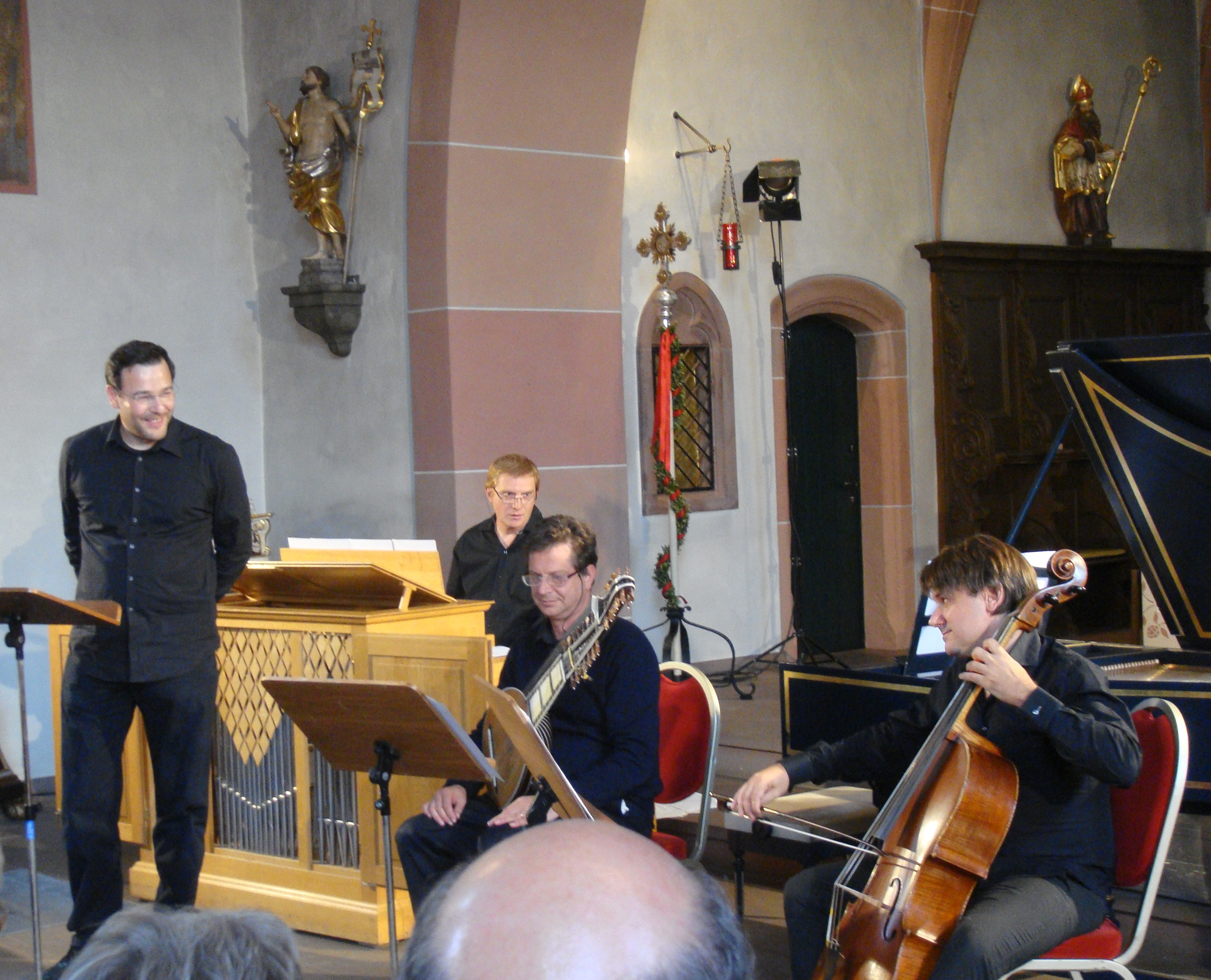
Andreas Scholl and members of the Baroque orchestra Accademia Bizantina in a concert of the Rheingau Musik Festival (RMF) at the church of Hallgarten, 16 July 2011

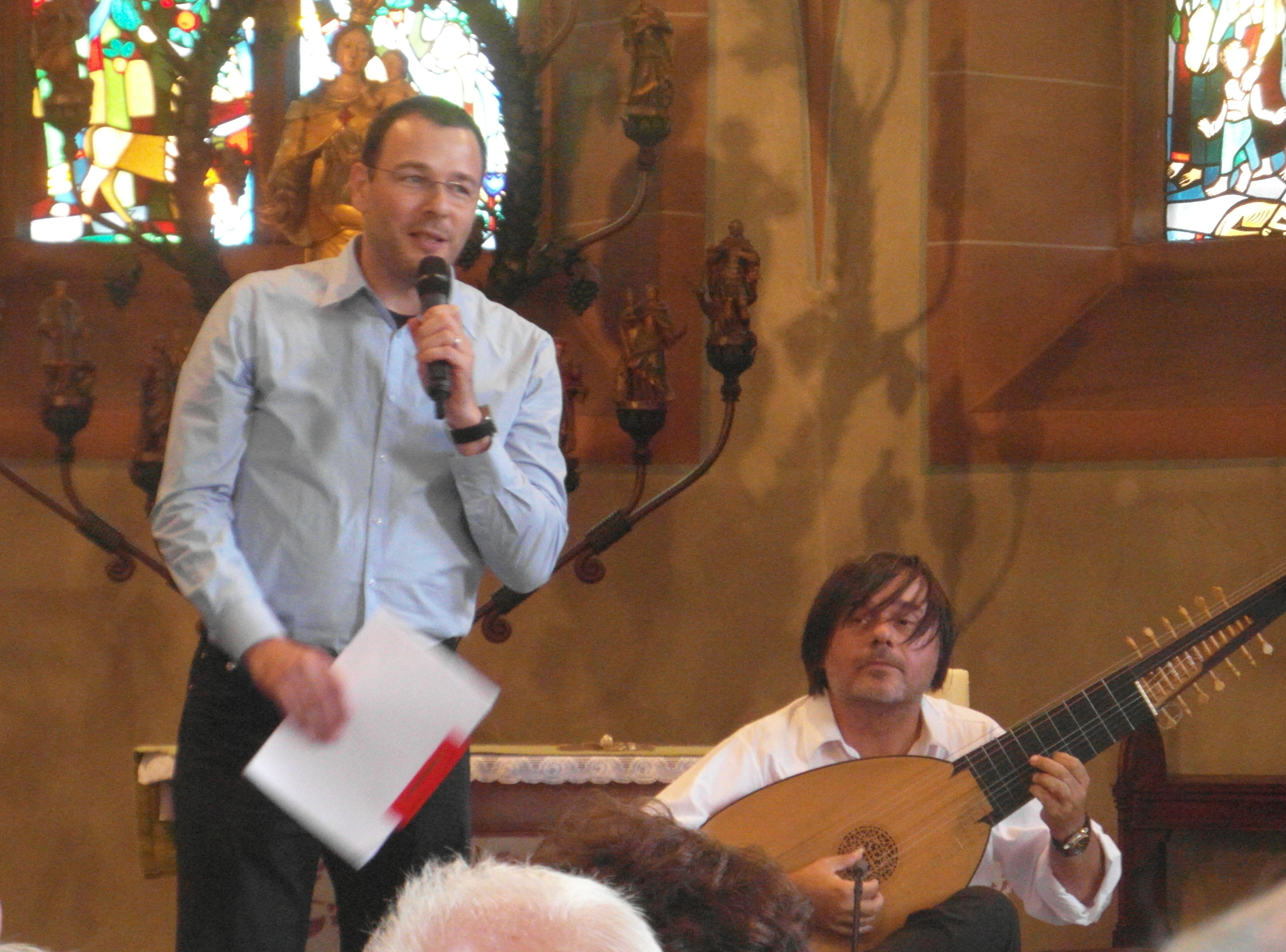
The singer with Edin Karamazov in 2013

In 2011 Scholl made his debut at the RMF in three events, an interview, a trip to three churches with different concert programs, and an opera recital with his sister Elisabeth at Eberbach Abbey. In the Christophoruskirche of Wiesbaden-Schierstein he appeared with his wife Tamar Halperin on harpsichord, in Hallgarten with members of the Accademia Bizantina, in the romanesque Basilika St. Aegidius of Mittelheim with the vocal trio White Raven. The opera recital with the chamber orchestra Accademia Bizantina contained works of Handel and Purcell, such as Handel's Rodelinda, Purcell's King Arthur, closing with the final love duet "Caro! Bella!" from Giulio Cesare in Egitto. In 2011 he performed the alto part of Handel's Messiah in St. Martin, Idstein, with Katia Plaschka, Ulrich Cordes and Markus Flaig. A review describes his perfect timing in the recitatives, his pronounced declamation, technically perfect interpretation and phrasing of the arias, and his devotion to Handel's music and Jennens's text. The Air "He was despised" was regarded as the artistic high point of the concert. In 2013 he performed Bach cantatas BWV 82 and BWV 169 with the Kammerorchester Basel. He appeared with the vocal ensemble Profeti della Quinta and lutenist Edin Karamazov.

=== Collaborations ===
Andreas Scholl has worked with most contemporary Baroque specialists, including Christophe Coin, Michel Corboz, Paul Dyer, John Eliot Gardiner, Reinhard Goebel, Christopher Hogwood, Robert King, Nicholas McGegan, Roger Norrington, Christophe Rousset, Dominique Veillard and Roland Wilson. He took part in the project of Ton Koopman and the Amsterdam Baroque Orchestra & Choir to record the complete vocal works of Bach. His regular solo partners include cembalist Markus Märkl and the virtuoso lutenist Edin Karamazov. He performed as a member of Konrad Junghänel's Cantus Cölln, and has collaborated with ensembles such as the Orchestra of the Age of Enlightenment, Musica Antiqua Köln, the Akademie für Alte Musik Berlin, the Freiburger Barockorchester, the Australian Brandenburg Orchestra and Accademia Bizantina.

The composer Marco Rosano has created a new Stabat Mater for Andreas Scholl; he sang the first complete performance of this work on 22 February 2008 at the City Recital Hall, Angel Place, Sydney, accompanied by the Australian Brandenburg Orchestra under Paul Dyer.

=== Popular music ===
Scholl has always composed songs, as well as music for ballet and theatre, and has his own professional sound studio in Basel, Switzerland. His song White as Lilies, based on ideas of John Dowland, is on the 1995 CD The Countertenors (with Dominique Visse and Pascal Bertin). It was a hit in Korea when used in a TV commercial and was later released there in an orchestrated version. In December 2003, he gave his first public performance in popular music, an eclectic programme of electronic and orchestral works which included his own compositions. Alongside Scholl was fellow Baroque countertenor, Roland Kunz, who specialises in setting Elizabethan English poems to his own electronic music. The two countertenors duetted in Scholl's and Kunz's songs, backed by Kunz's band die Unerlösten and the Rundfunk-Sinfonieorchester Saarbrücken under Rick Stengårds. In 2013 he collaborated with Idan Raichel in his album Quarter to Six.

== Recordings ==
The bulk of Scholl's recording career has been with Harmonia Mundi and Decca. By 1998 his CDs dominated Harmonia Mundi's hit list at numbers one, three, four, five and ten, and they are still among Harmonia Mundi's best sellers. His discography amounts to more than sixty CDs, all but two being music of the European Baroque or Renaissance.

Many recordings in which he has collaborated have won awards. His personal accolades include the Diapason d'Or, multiple Gramophone Awards, 10 de Repertoire, ffff Telerama and Choc du Monde de la Musique, the ECHO award and Prix de l'Union de la Presse Musicale Belge. In an extremely rare departure from its normally austere approach, Fanfare magazine described his recording of Dowland's A Musicall Banquet as "perfect". The recording of Bach's St John Passion conducted by Philippe Herreweghe on which Andreas Scholl sings was nominated for a Cannes Classical Award in 2003. He was Germany's Kultur Radio Artist of the Year in 1998. He has revealed, to German audiences in particular, some little-known masterworks of German Baroque composers and has thereby made a significant contribution to the modern rediscovery of the Baroque repertoire. His 2001 album of folk songs, Wayfaring Stranger, was a personal project, well received by the CD-buying public but not universally acclaimed by his fellow musicians, some of whom regarded it as an inappropriate departure from his more classical work.

Scholl has often interpreted the works of Oswald von Wolkenstein. This includes the 2010 album Wolkenstein - Songs of Myself, which Gramophone magazine characterized as "[m]agnificent music magically presented by one of the great singers of our time."

== Awards ==
In 2015 Scholl was the 22nd recipient of the Rheingau Musik Preis.

His recording of Vivaldi's Stabat Mater with Ensemble 415 under Chiara Banchini received a Gramophone Award for best Baroque Vocal performance in 1996.

== Personal life ==
In 2012 Scholl married pianist, harpsichordist and composer Tamar Halperin. They live in a small village in Germany.
