= Maria Königin, Niedernhausen =

Catholic church in Niedernhausen, Rheingau-Taunus-Kreis, Germany

Maria Königin
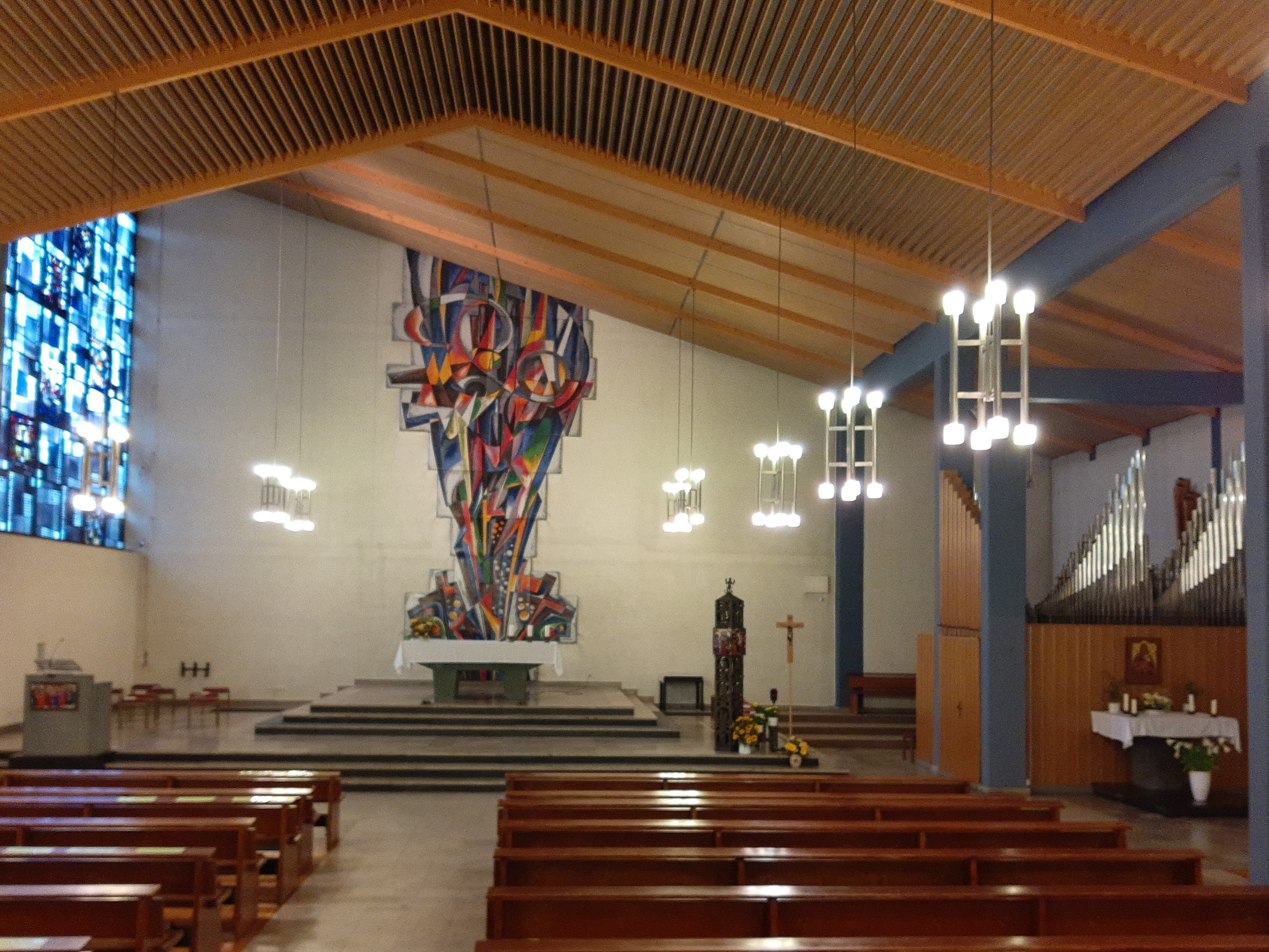
- Location: Niedernhausen, Hesse, Germany
- Denomination: Catholic
- Website: katholisch-idsteinerland.de/beitrag/zentrales-pfarrbuero-kirchorte-und-unsere-kirchen/

History
- Dedication: Mary, mother of Jesus
- Consecrated: 1960

Administration
- Diocese: Limburg

Maria Königin (Mary Queen [of Heaven]) is the name of a Catholic church in Niedernhausen, Rheingau-Taunus-Kreis, Hesse, Germany. The Wörsdorf parish belongs to St. Martin Idsteiner Land. The church, the second Catholic church in Niedernhausen, was consecrated in 1960.

== History ==
Niedernhausen had only few Catholic inhabitants until the end of World War II. They had a small church, built from 1881 and dedicated on 20 September 1885 to Maria Geburt (Birth of Mary). When many people arrived as refugees, the church was too small, and a new church, Maria Königin, was built. When it was opened in 1960, the old church became a culture centre, Zentrum Alte Kirche.

In 1976, the parish St. Michael, Oberjosbach, was joined to Maria Königin. In 2017, both church locations became part of the parish St. Martin, Idsteiner Land.
