= Christian Rathgeber =

German tenor

- Education: Hochschule für Musik Mainz
- Occupation: Classical tenor
- Website: www.christian-rathgeber.de

Christian Rathgeber is a German classical tenor with a focus on concerts. He made many recordings, both as a soloist as a member of vocal ensembles and choirs.

== Life and career ==
Rathgeber was born in Frankfurt am Main Germany. As a boy he was a member of the Windsbacher Knabenchor. He studied voice privately with Hans Peter Blochwitz and Martin Hummel, and then completed studies at the Hochschule für Musik Mainz with Andreas Karasiak.

With a focus on concert music, especially by Johann Sebastian Bach, he toured Europe. He made many recordings, both as a soloist as a member of vocal ensembles and choirs. In 2018 he recorded at the Mainz Cathedral Gounod's St. Cecilia Mass with the Mainzer Domchor and orchestra, conducted by Karsten Storck. He recorded Bach's Ascension Oratorio with the Gutenberg-Kammerchor and the Neumeyer Consort, conducted by Felix Koch.
