= Franz Vitzthum =

German opera singer

- Education: Regensburger Domspatzen; Musikhochschule Köln
- Occupation: Countertenor
- Website: www.franzvitzthum.de

Franz Vitzthum is a German countertenor, a male classical singer in the alto vocal range, specialising in Baroque music. He was trained as a boy singer with the Regensburger Domspatzen and studied with Kai Wessel at the Musikhochschule Köln. He is a member of the Staatstheater Karlsruhe and the vocal quartet Stimmwerck.
