= Markus Melchiori =

Markus Melchiori is a German church musician and academic teacher. He has served as Domkapellmeister at the Speyer Cathedral from 2009, and has taught choral conducting at the Hochschule für Musik Freiburg from 2010.

== Life and career ==
Melchiori studied church music at the Hochschule für Musik und Darstellende Kunst Frankfurt am Main, on a scholarship of the Cusanuswerk. He was the choral conductor of the Limburger Domsingknaben and the Mädchenkantorei there from 1999 to 2009, appointed as Domchordirektor in 2006. He moved to the Speyer Cathedral as Domkapellmeister (director of the cathedral music) in 2009.

Melchiori has taught choral conducting at the Hochschule für Musik Freiburg from 2010.
