= Da pacem Domine (Pärt) =

2004 musical composition by Arvo Pärt

- by Arvo Pärt
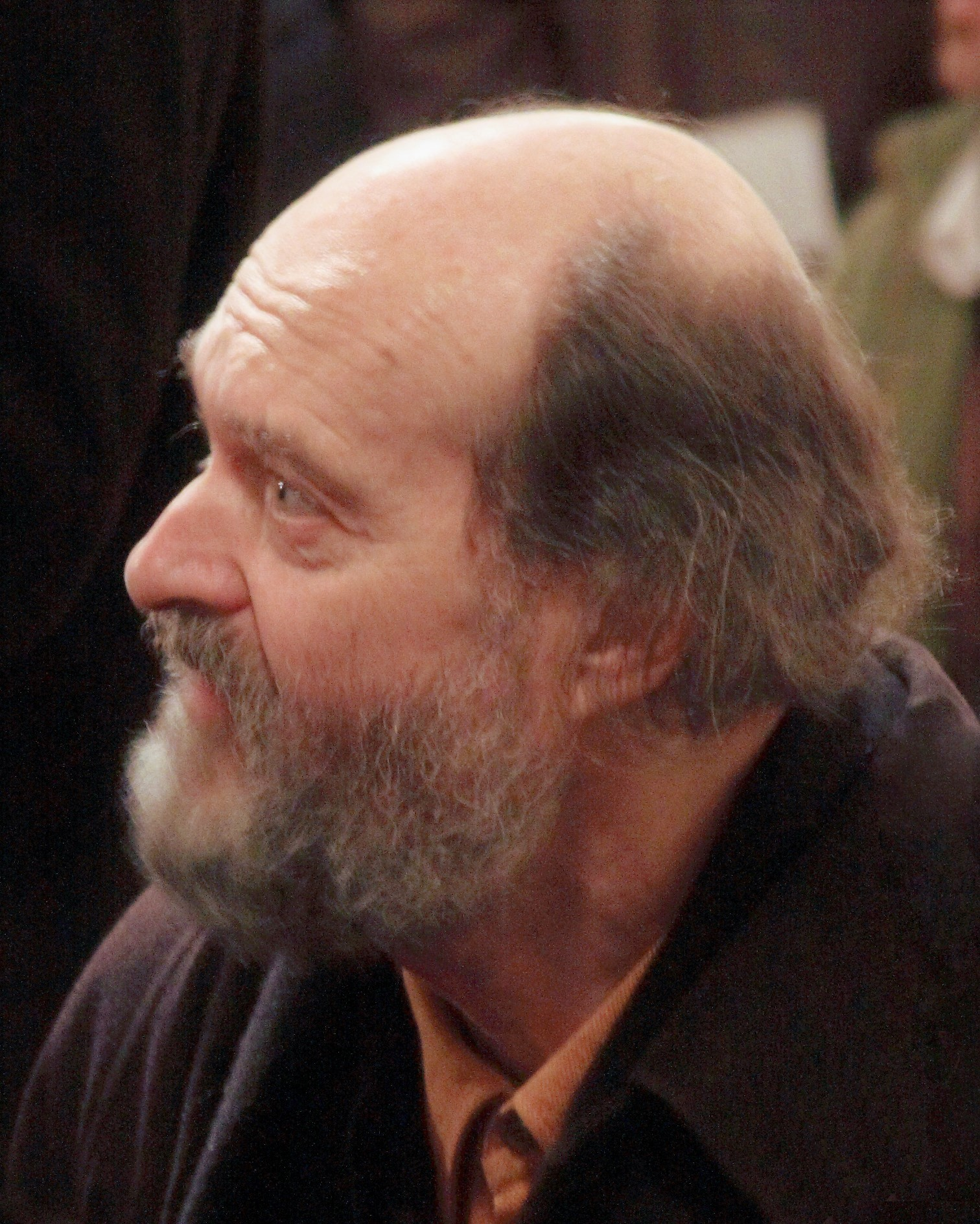
- The composer in 2008
- Style: Contemporary music
- Form: Sacred choral
- Text: Da pacem Domine
- Language: Latin
- Composed: 2004
- Performed: 29 March 2005
- Scoring: SATB choir; SATB choir and string orchestra; String quartet; String orchestra

Da pacem Domine (Give peace, Lord) is a choral composition by Arvo Pärt on the Latin prayer for peace Da pacem Domine, first composed in 2004 for four voices. Different versions, also for and with string instruments, were published by Universal Edition.

== History ==
The work was commissioned by Jordi Savall for a peace concert in Barcelona on 1 July 2004. Pärt began the composition two days after the 2004 Madrid train bombings, in memory of the victims. It was first recorded on 29 March 2005 by the Hilliard Ensemble in St. Gerold, Austria. In Spain, it has been performed annually to commemorate the victims.

The text is a 6th or 7th-century hymn based on biblical verses 2 Kings 20:19, 2 Chronicles 20:12,15 and Psalm 72:6-7. Da pacem Domine is in one movement and takes about five minutes to perform. It was originally set for four voices. Pärt later wrote several versions, also for voices and string orchestra, and for instruments alone, string quartet or string orchestra. They were published by Universal Edition. The first performance for the version for voices and string orchestra was in Tallinn on 18 May 2007 at the Niguliste Church, with the Estonian Philharmonic Chamber Choir and the Tallinn Chamber Orchestra, conducted by Tõnu Kaljuste.

The music critic and writer David Vernier commented on the composer's subtle techniques of composition, forming the structure of the music from "elemental materials" such as "sonority, voicing, and rudimentary harmonies". Vernier noted "an almost complete subordination of rhythmic influence and the relegation of melody to a more or less implied presence".

A review in The New York Times mentioned the composer's "temporal rootlessness" and continued:

On the surface these are slow-moving, meditative scores. “Da Pacem Domine” (2004), a prayer for peace, is cast in sustained tones with little harmonic growth and hardly any momentum, yet a listener is drawn inexorably into its hypnotic four-part unaccompanied vocal texture.

== Recordings ==
- Arvo Pärt: Lamentate / Da Pacem Domine & Lamentate, Hilliard Ensemble, 2005
- Da pacem, Estonian Philharmonic Chamber Choir, Paul Hillier, 2006
- In principio, Estonian Philharmonic Chamber Choir, Tõnu Kaljuste, 2009
