= Service in B-flat major, Op. 10 (Stanford) =

Service in B-flat major
- Sacred choral composition by Charles Villiers Stanford
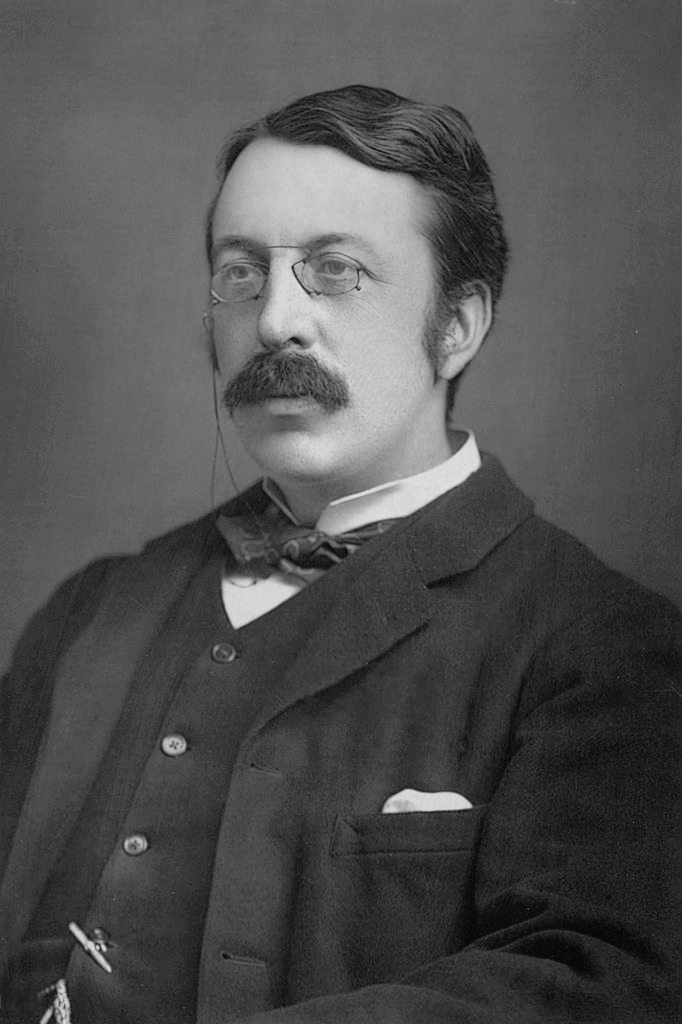
- The composer c. 1894
- Full title: Morning, Communion and Evening Service in B-flat
- Opus: 10
- Text: Liturgical texts of the Anglican Service
- Language: English
- Composed: 1879
- Published: 1902
- Vocal: SATB choir; organ

The Service in B-flat major (in full Morning, Evening and Communion Service in B-flat), Op. 10, is a collection of Anglican church music by Charles Villiers Stanford for mixed choir and organ containing the canticles for each of the principal services of the Anglican Church. Stanford set the traditional liturgical texts in English in 1879 when he was the organist of Trinity College, Cambridge. They were published by Novello in 1902. Stanford orchestrated the work in 1903, with additional organ.

== History ==
In 1877, Charles Villiers Stanford, returning from extended studies in Leipzig and Berlin, was appointed organist of Trinity College, Cambridge. He had to conduct two weekly rehearsals, training the boys for six hours per week during term time, and four hours during holiday periods. Choral services were held on Saturdays and Sundays, also on Christmas Eve, on Christmas Day, on the Feast of the Circumcision (1 January) and Epiphany (6 January).

Stanford composed the service in B♭ major, as the first of several, for mixed choir and organ in 1879. He set the traditional liturgical Anglican texts in English, as part of his efforts to improve singing at the College Chapel. The Jubilate Deo (Psalm 100) and Te Deum in B♭ were first performed during Matins (Morning service) on 25 May 1879. On 24 August that year, during vacation, the Te Deum was repeated with the first performance of the Benedictus, while the Magnificat and the Nunc dimittis were first performed in the evening service. The Service in B♭ was a significant development in Stanford's setting of the morning and evening canticles.

== Structure and music ==
The work is structured in the ten traditional sections of the Anglican service:

- Morning Service
  - Te Deum
  - Jubilate
  - Benedictus
- Communion Service
  - Kyrie (10-fold)
  - Credo
  - Sursum corda
  - Sanctus
  - Gloria in excelsis
- Evening Service
  - Magnificat
  - Nunc dimittis

A reviewer summarised: "The service is a major milestone in the development of Anglican church music, representing the harnessing of Brahmsian symphonic technique to the needs of the Anglican liturgy."

== Recordings ==
A 2010 recording The Feast of Saint Peter the Apostle at Westminster Abbey, celebrating the patron saint of Westminster Abbey, contains four of the ten parts, performed by the Choir of Westminster Abbey and organist Robert Quinney, conducted by James O'Donnell.
