= Veronika Winter =

German soprano

Veronika Winter (born 2 February 1965 in Limburg an der Lahn) is a German soprano. She is particularly noted for her recordings of Baroque music. She studied musicology and Italian at the University of Erlangen and singing at the Heidelberg/Mannheim Musikhochschule. Her voice teachers included Norma Lerer, Eva-Maria Molnar, Karlheinz Jarius and Barbara Schlick.
