= Evangelist (Bach) =

Role of a singer

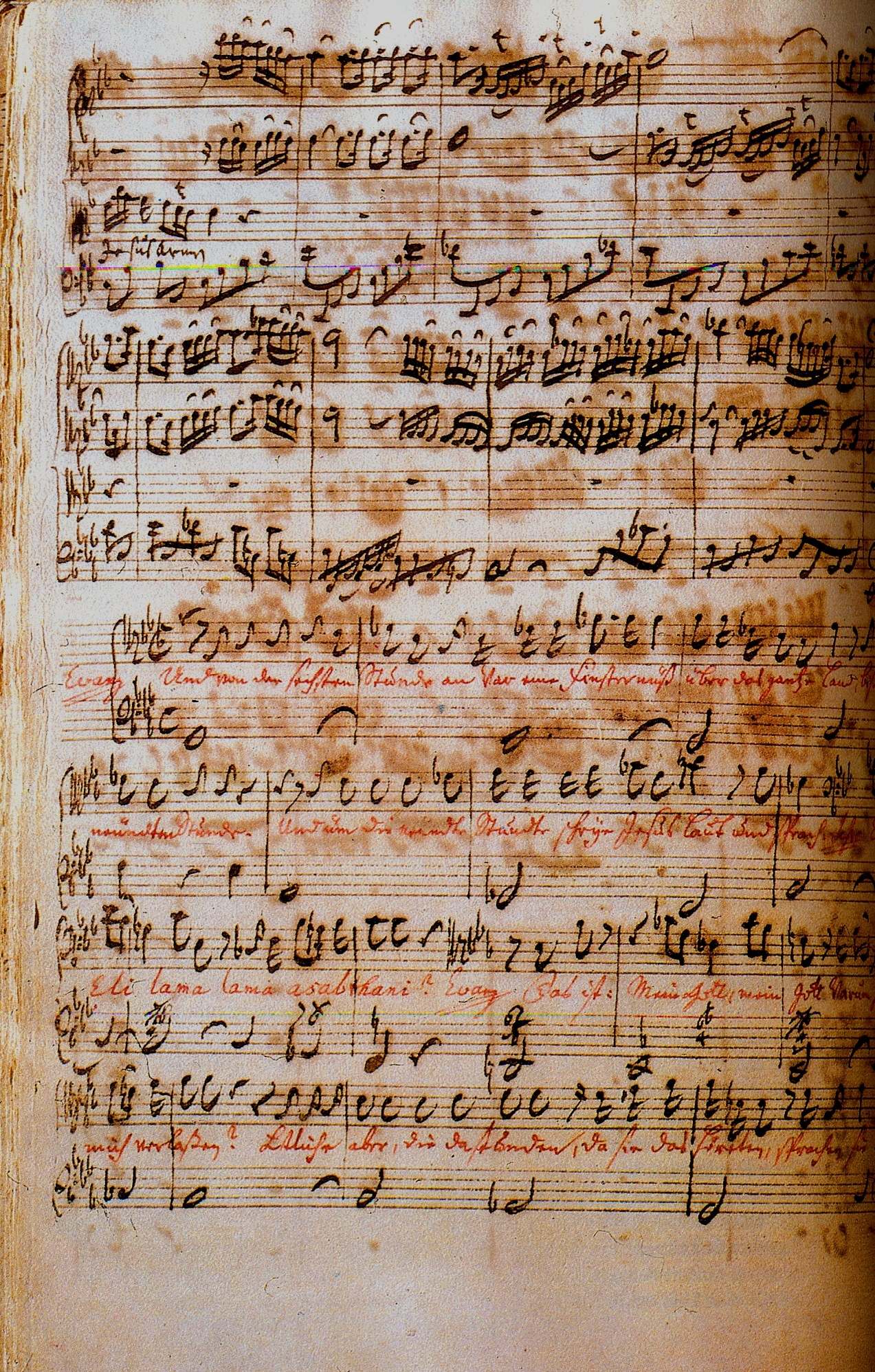
Beginning of a recitative (St Matthew Passion, No. 61), the Bible words written in red

The Evangelist in the music of Johann Sebastian Bach is the tenor part in his oratorios and Passions who narrates the exact words of one of the Four Evangelists of the Bible, translated by Martin Luther, in recitative secco. The part appears in the works St John Passion, St Matthew Passion, and the Christmas Oratorio, as well as the St Mark Passion and the Ascension Oratorio Lobet Gott in seinen Reichen, BWV 11. Some cantatas also contain recitatives of Bible quotations, assigned to the tenor voice.

Bach followed a tradition using the tenor for the narrator of a gospel. It exists (and is also often called the Evangelist) in earlier works setting biblical narration, for example by Heinrich Schütz (Weinachtshistorie, Matthäuspassion, Lukaspassion, Johannespassion).

In contrast, the vox Christi, voice of Christ, is always the bass in Bach's works, including several cantatas.

== Music and sources ==
The Evangelist reports in secco recitatives accompanied by basso continuo only.

In the St John Passion the story consists of chapters 18 and 19 of John the Evangelist, the St Matthew Passion tells the complete chapters 26 and 27 of Matthew the Evangelist. The first versions of the St. John Passion contained two additional lines from Matthew mentioning the weeping of the disciple Peter and the tearing of the temple curtain. Bach composed the weeping in an expressive melisma and the tearing in a forceful downward run followed by tremolo, but removed the parts in later versions.

The Christmas Oratorio follows Luke the Evangelist for parts 1 to 4, and St. Matthew for Parts 5 and 6. A St Mark Passion after Mark the Evangelist is lost, but has been reconstructed by several scholars. In the Ascension Oratorio, BWV 11, the story is compiled verse by verse from different biblical sources. The Easter Oratorio is an exception, as a play of four biblical characters without narration.

== Evangelist singers ==
Some tenors are known especially for their rendition of the Evangelist, including:

- Theo Altmeyer
- Gervase Elwes
- Karl Erb, mentioned in Thomas Mann's novel Doctor Faustus as Erbe (in English: Heritage)
- Kurt Equiluz
- Ernst Haefliger
- John van Kesteren
- Peter Pears
- Christoph Prégardien
- Peter Schreier
- James Taylor
- Steuart Wilson
- Derek Chester

== Evangelist in cantatas ==
The Evangelist narrates in several cantatas.

In Jesus nahm zu sich die Zwölfe, BWV 22 (7 February 1723, Quinquagesima), the cantata starts with a scene from the Gospel, the announcement of suffering in Jerusalem, quoting Luke 18:31,34. The tenor as the Evangelist begins the narration from the verse 31, Jesus nahm zu sich die Zwölfe (Jesus gathered the twelve to Himself). The bass as the vox Christi (voice of Christ) sings the announcement of the suffering, Sehet, wir gehn hinauf gen Jerusalem (Behold, we go up to Jerusalem), A choral fugue illustrates the reaction of the disciples.

In Am Abend aber desselbigen Sabbats, BWV 42 (8 April 1725, first Sunday after Easter), the tenor opens after a Sinfonia, accompanied by the continuo in repeated fast notes, possibly illustrating the anxious heart beat of the disciples, when Jesus appears, "On the evening, however, of the same Sabbath, when the disciples had gathered and the door was locked out of fear of the Jews, Jesus came and walked among them", John 20:19.

In Er rufet seinen Schafen mit Namen, BWV 175 (22 May 1725, Pentecost Tuesday), the tenor sings the opening recitative, "Er rufet seinen Schafen mit Namen und führet sie hinaus", John 10:3.

In Siehe, ich will viel Fischer aussenden, BWV 88 (21 July 1726, 5th Sunday after Trinity), the tenor begins part 2 with a recitative on Luke 5:10, "Jesus sprach zu Simon" (Jesus said to Simon).

In Wer Dank opfert, der preiset mich, BWV 17 (22 September 1726, 14th Sunday after Trinity), the tenor begins part 2 with a recitative on Luke 17:15–16.

== Fifth Evangelist ==
Bach himself is frequently referred to as the Fifth Evangelist for his devoted interpretation of the biblical sources. In 1929 the Swedish bishop Nathan Söderblom had called Bach's cantatas the Fifth Gospel.
