= Carsten Koch (musician) =

German organist, choral conductor and academic

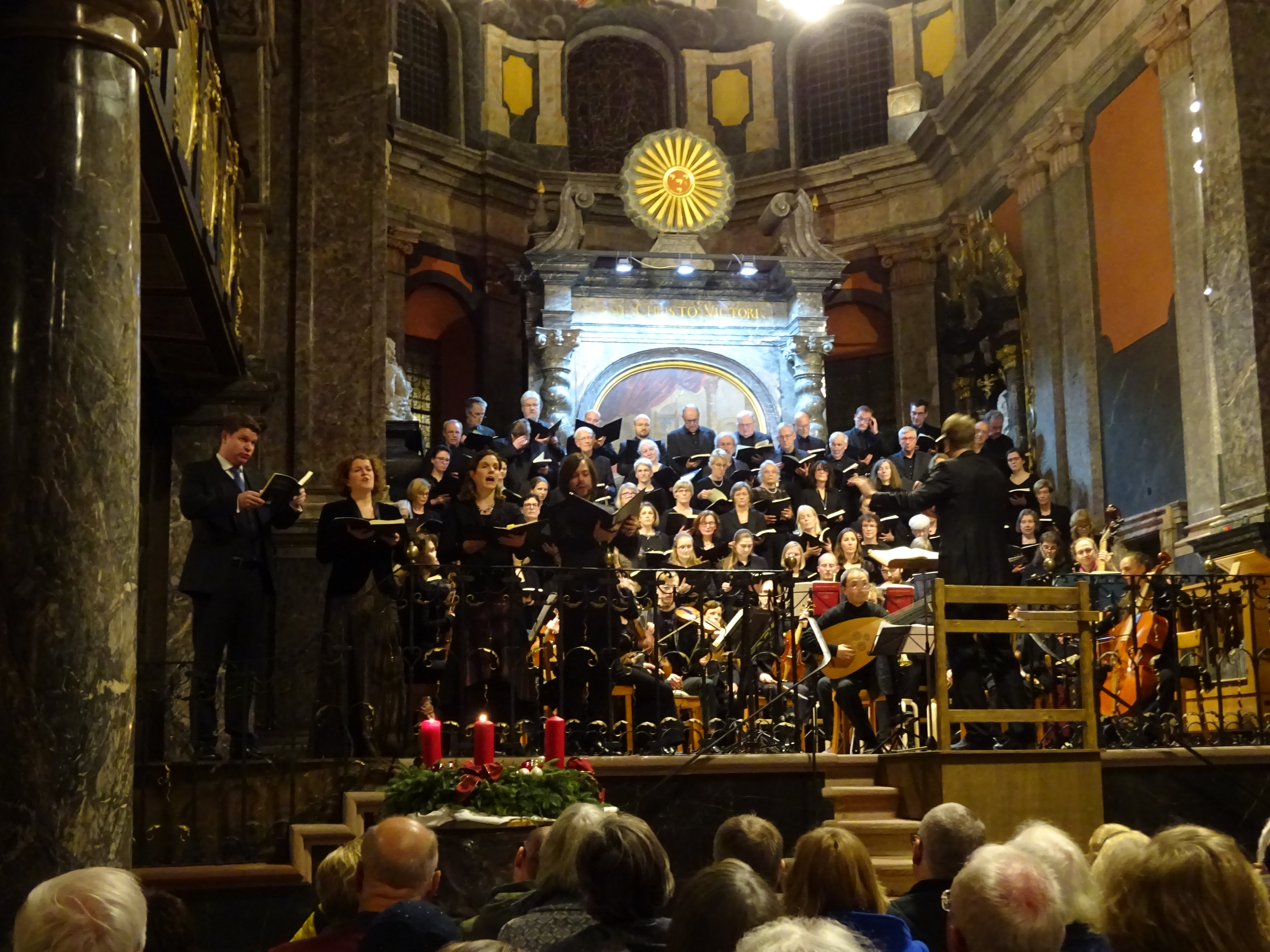
- Choral concert at the Unionskirche, Idstein, Bach: Christmas Oratorio, Part 6
- Born: 1975 (age 50–51); Kaiserslautern, Germany
- Education: Musikhochschule Frankfurt
- Occupations: Conductor; Organist; Academic teacher
- Organizations: Unionskirche, Idstein; Idsteiner Kantorei; Nassauische Kammerphilharmonie; Musikhochschule Frankfurt

Carsten Koch (born 1975) is a German organist, choral conductor and academic. He is the church musician at the Unionskirche in Idstein, Hesse, conducting the concert choir Idsteiner Kantorei and the orchestra Nassauische Kammerphilharmonie that he founded. He lectured orchestral conducting at the Frankfurt University of Music and Performing Arts.

== Career ==
Born in Kaiserslautern, Koch first studied music and German pedagogy, graduating with a focus on organ playing and choral conducting. He continued his studies at the Musikhochschule Frankfurt, organ with Daniel Roth, and orchestral conducting. He trained as a conductor with the Dirigentenwerkstatt Interaktion in Berlin with players of the Berliner Philharmoniker, among others. In 2005, he was a finalist of the Bad Homburg international conducting competition. He was an assistant of Wojciech Rajski and the Polish Chamber Philharmonic Orchestra Sopot. Koch was a lecturer of orchestral conducting at the Frankfurt University of Music and Performing Arts from 2003 to 2013.

From 2003, Koch has been the church musician at the Protestant Unionskirche in Idstein, responsible for the deanery as Dekanatskantor. He has conducted the concert choir Idsteiner Kantorei since, and founded in 2003 the orchestra Nassauische Kammerphilharmonie for choral and orchestral concerts. The historic church features an organ built in 1912 by Walcker, retaining the case (Prospekt) of a Stumm organ from 1783.

== Concerts ==
In the Idstein region, Koch has conducted symphonic concerts at the Unionskirche, regularly on the Tag des offenen Denkmals (European Heritage Day), including a cycle of all Beethoven symphonies. The cycle was completed in 2012 with the Ninth Symphony, celebrating the 40th anniversary of the Idsteiner Kantorei, and the centenary of the organ. Koch has conducted choral concerts, two to three per year at the Unionskirche, and others also at St. Martin, Idstein, and in smaller churches in the deanery. In 2010, he conducted Verdi's Messa da Requiem at St. Martin in an ecumenical project of three choirs. In 2015, he conducted the same joined choirs in Te Deum and Gloria by Karl Jenkins. In an international collaboration also with the Belgian choir De Wase Kantorij from the sister town Zwijndrecht, he conducted Haydn's Die Schöpfung in 2016, both in Idstein and in Zwijndrecht. In 2017, his first concert back in the Unionskirche after extended restoration work included Ola Gjeilo's Sunrise Mass and Eric Whitacre's Five Hebrew Love Songs. In 2018, he shared Bach's Christmas Oratorio with his colleague, Franz Fink of St. Martin, in concerts at the Unionskirche.
