= Idsteiner Kantorei =

Ctoir in Idstein, Rheingau-Taunus-Kreis, Germany

- Choir
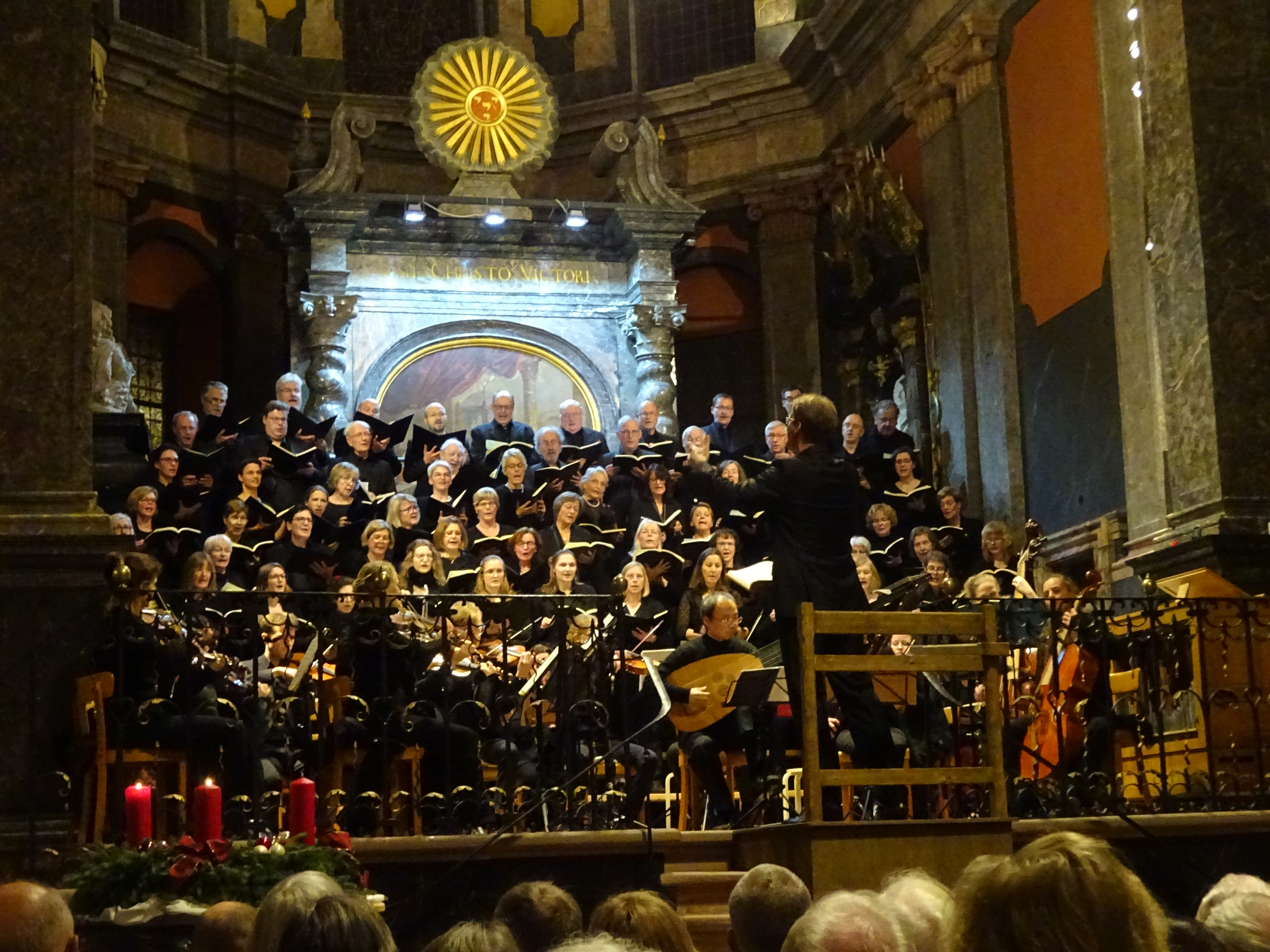
- Choral concert at the Unionskirche, Idstein, conducted by Carsten Koch, Bach: Christmas Oratorio, Part 4
- Origin: Idstein, Hesse, Germany
- Founded: 1972
- Genre: Mixed choir
- Members: 80
- Chief conductor: Carsten Koch
- Website: www.idsteiner-kantorei.de

Idsteiner Kantorei (Idstein chorale) is a mixed choir in Idstein, Rheingau-Taunus-Kreis, Germany. The group performs regularly in the Protestant Unionskirche in services and concerts, also in smaller churches of the region and internationally. They collaborate with other choirs for larger projects.

== History and location ==
The Idsteiner Kantorei was founded by Edwin Müller in 1972, based on the church choir at the Unionskirche. He was succeeded by Carsten Koch, who is also lecturer of conducting at the Musikhochschule Frankfurt, in 2003. The choir performs in major services, such as Christmas, Easter and Konfirmation, and sings regular concerts, some in chamber formation in the smaller historic churches of the region.

The historic Unionskirche had a 1783 Stumm organ, which was replaced in 1912 by an instrument of Walcker, but retaining the historic case (Prospekt).

== Choral concerts ==
Two to three annual concerts with soloists and orchestra have included a Bach cantata and the Missa, BWV during the Idsteiner Bachtage of 2000, with the orchestra Antichi Strumenti in historically informed performance conducted by Edwin Müller. In 2002, on the occasion of the Hessentag, the choir and the choirs of St. Martin, Idstein, performed Haydn's Die Schöpfung in two concerts, an abbreviated version with explanations given by the conductors, announced as "not only for children", followed by the complete music. The conductors Müller and Franz Fink each conducted half of the work, with soloists Valentina Farcas, Daniel Sans and Johannes Schendel, and again the Antichi Strumenti. In 2010, another joined project of these choirs was Verdi's Messa da Requiem. Now Carsten Koch and Frank Fink conducted the Nassauische Kammerphilharmonie and soloists Christiane Kohl, Christa Bonhoff, Dantes Diwiak and Andreas Pruys. In 2015, the combined choirs performed Te Deum and Gloria by Karl Jenkins. In an international collaboration with the Belgian choir De Wase Kantorij from the sister town of Zwijndrecht, they once again performed Haydn's Creation in 2016, with soloists Susanne Völger, Christian Rathgeber and Johannes Hill, both in Idstein and in Zwijndrecht. In 2017, the Idsteiner Kantorei were once again able to perform a concert in the Unionskirche, after it had been under renovation for several years. They performed Ola Gjeilo's Sunrise Mass and Eric Whitacre's Five Hebrew Love Songs.
