= Unionskirche, Idstein =

Protestant church in Idstein, Germany

Unionskirche
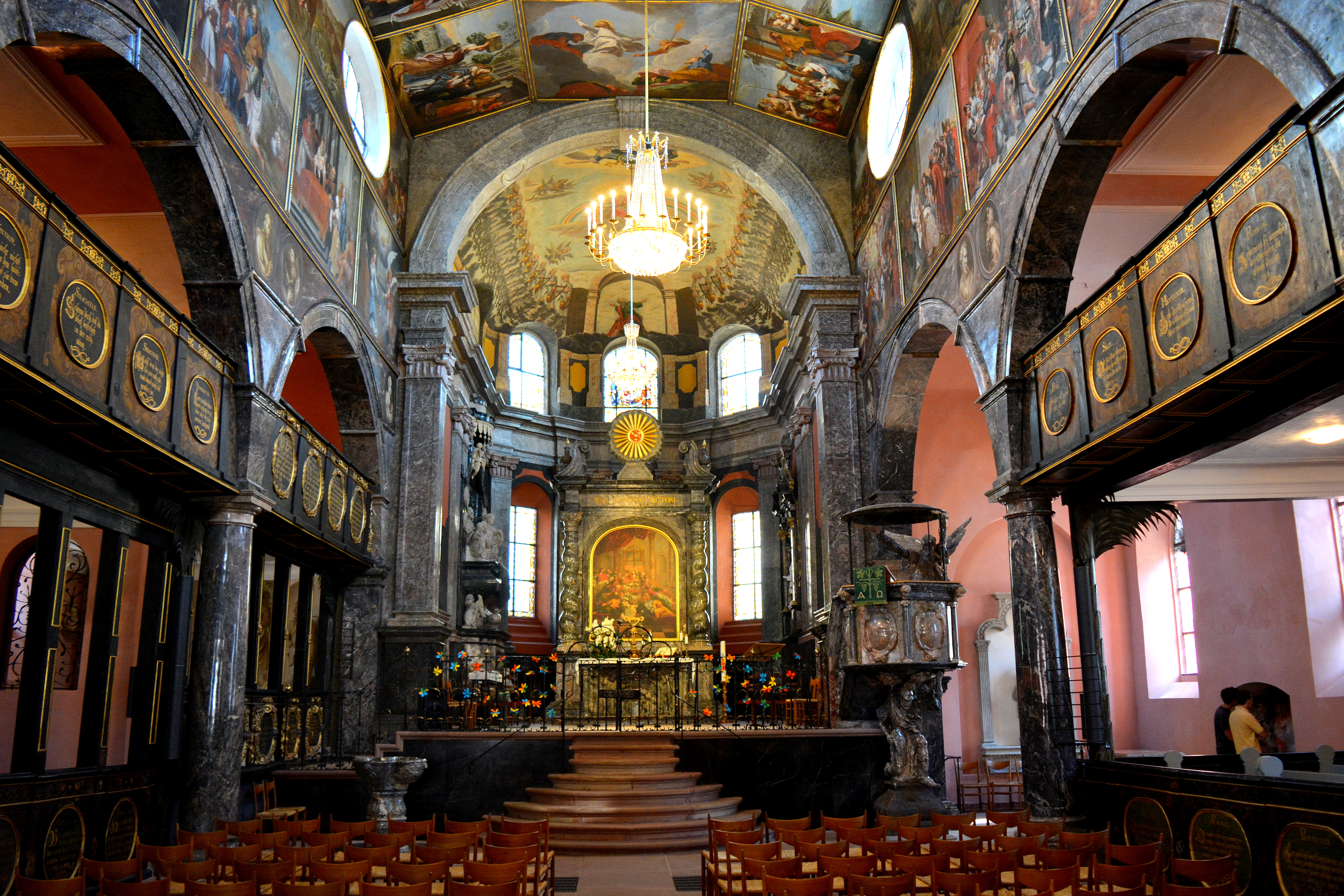
- Interior facing the altar, in 2017 after restoration
- Unionskirche
- 50°13′15″N 8°16′11″E
- Location: Idstein
- Country: Germany
- Denomination: Protestant Church in Nassau
- Website: www.ev-kirche-idstein.de

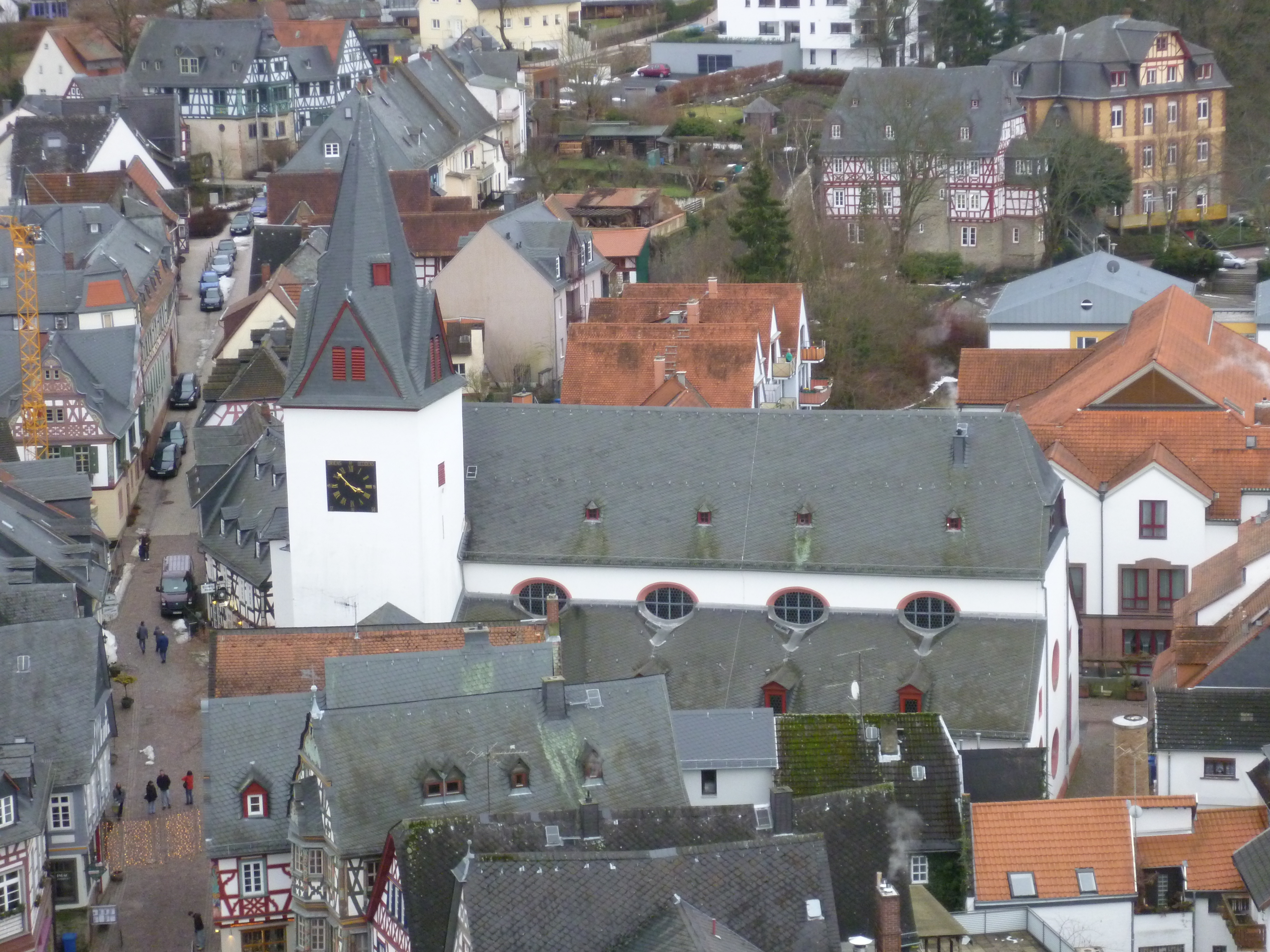
Unionskirche in Idstein, seen from the Hexenturm

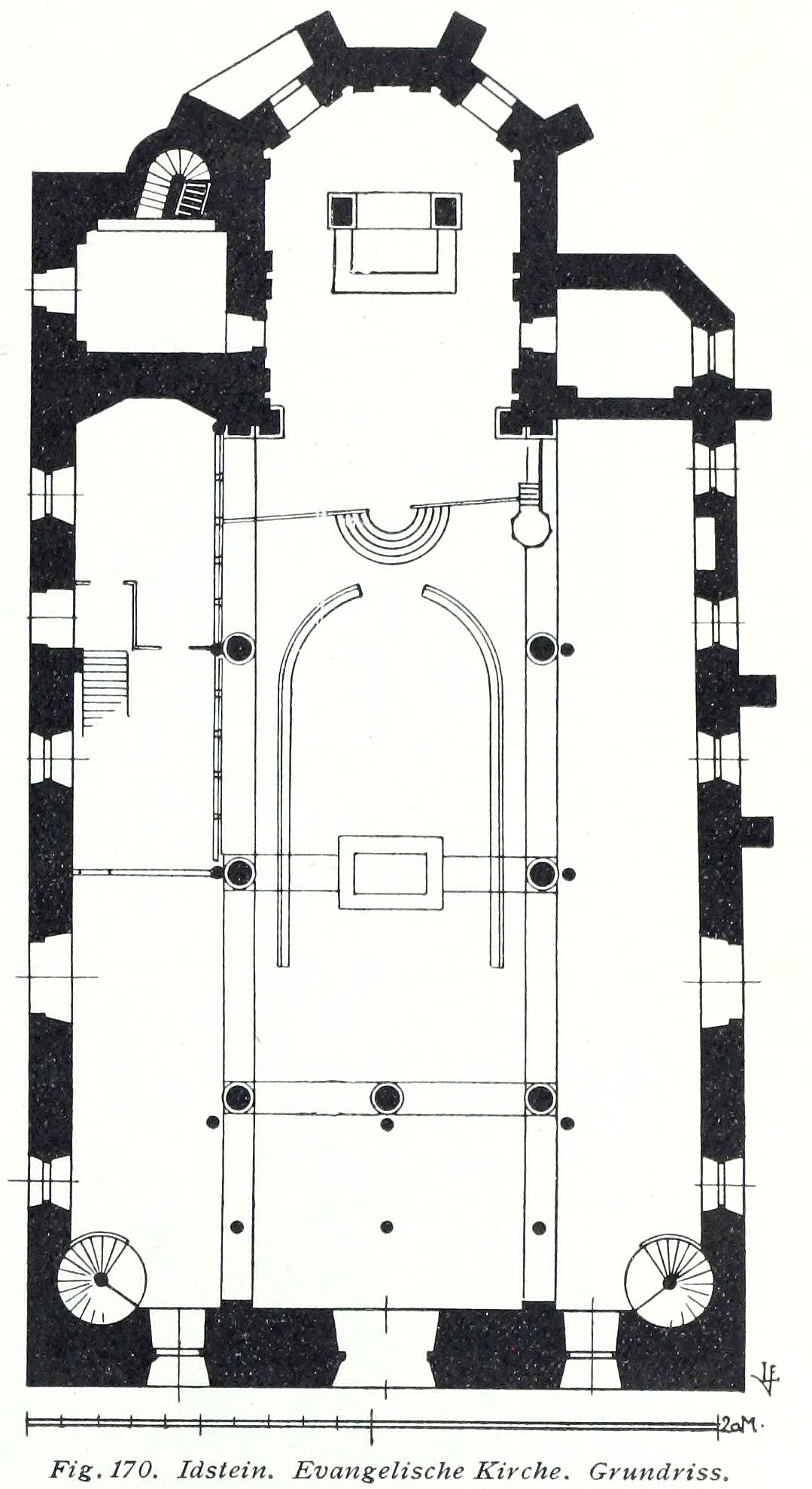
Floor plan, 1914

The Unionskirche (Union Church) is the active Protestant parish church of Idstein, a town in the Rheingau-Taunus district in the German state of Hesse. Idstein was a residence of the counts of Nassau. The church building in the center of the historic Altstadt (old town) dates back to the 14th century when it was built as a collegiate church. It became Lutheran during the Reformation. Its interior was adapted in the 17th century to become a Lutheran Predigt- und Hofkirche (sermon and court church). The most prominent decoration in the church is the series of 38 paintings by the Flemish painter Michael Angelo Immenraedt, an exponent of Flemish Baroque painting, and others. They follow a program of biblical scenes.

The church was named Unionskirche in 1917 to commemorate the union of Lutheran and Reformed Protestants in the Duchy of Nassau in August 1817, the first of its kind (before the Prussian Union in September of the same year). The Unionskirche is a recognized monument under the Hague Convention. The Protestant congregation uses it, and it is open to other institutions as a concert venue, including concerts of the Rheingau Musik Festival. It features an organ built in 1912 by Walcker Orgelbau and retaining the historic case dating back to 1783.

The church was restored from 2012 to 2017, completed for 500 years since the Reformation and 200 years since the Union. The restoration was awarded the Hessischer Denkmalschutzpreis (Hessian monument preservation prize).

== History ==
=== Collegiate church of St. Martin ===
Remnants in the tower, which lies north of the choir, show that a Romanesque church existed before 1287 at the same location. The present edifice was built from 1330 to 1350 under Gerlach, Count of Nassau, as a collegiate church for a college of six canons, founded in 1333. The college and church were dedicated to St. Martin.

=== Protestant church ===
Idstein became Lutheran during the Reformation. After the Thirty Years' War, the church was transformed to a representative Baroque Predigt- und Hofkirche (sermon and court church) by Count Johann of Nassau-Idstein. The restructuring lasted from 1665 to 1677. While the nave was retained, the church was expanded to the west, and the walls were raised, resulting in flatter roofs. Most of the pillars were removed, oval windows were installed in the clerestory, and portals were rounded. Arnold Harnisch (Mainz) and Hans Martin Sattler (Idstein) removed the vaults and built Marmorarkaden (marble arcades). Galleries were installed on three sides in 1675.

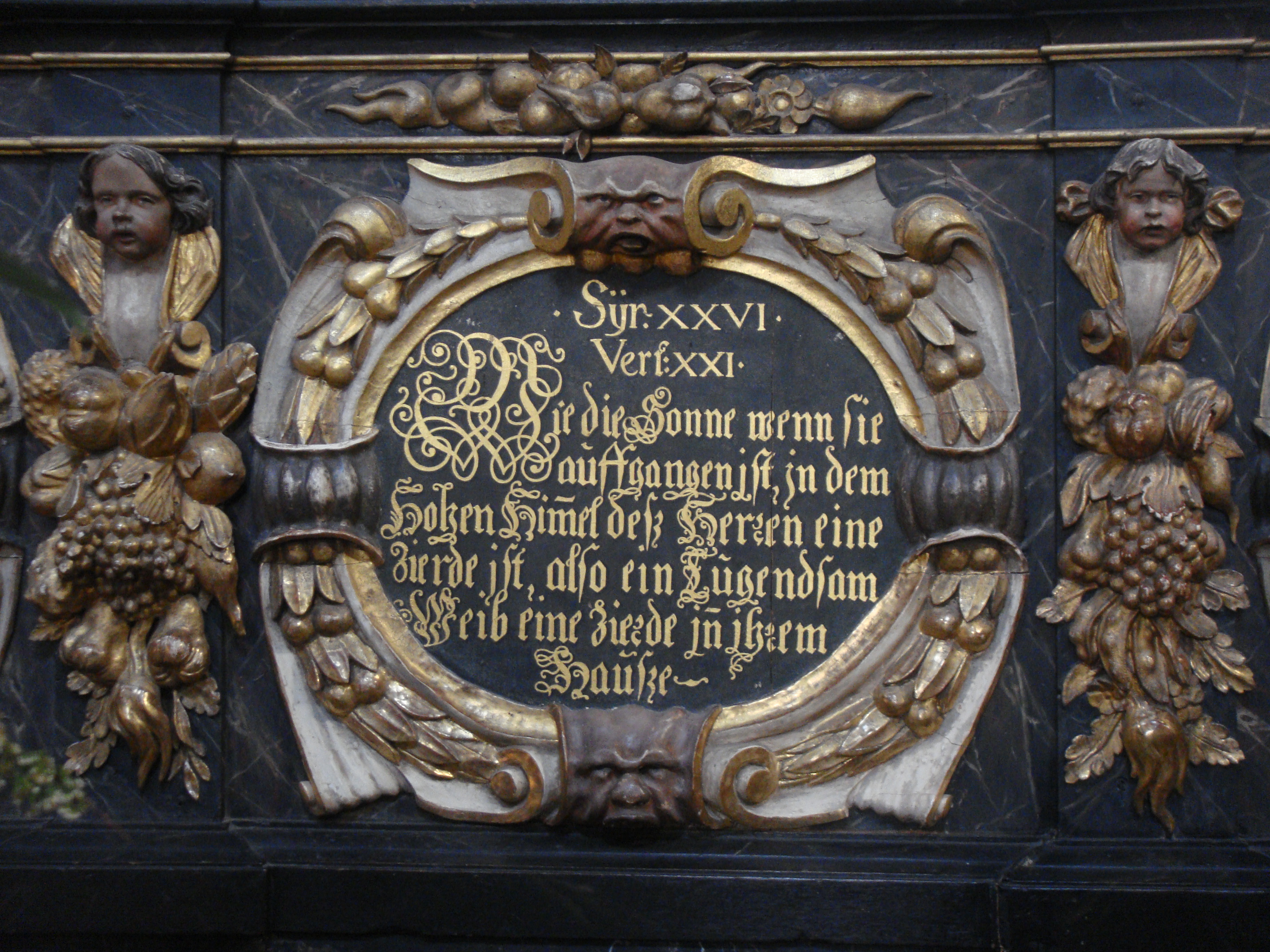
Plaque on a balustrade

There were reserved chairs for certain senior members of society in royal government, municipal government, administration, jurisprudence, presiding roles, and the citizenry (Herrschafts-, Rats-, Sekretär-, Gerichts-, Vorsteher-, Bürgerstuhl). Plaques on the respective balustrades show biblical quotations relevant to the position.

In 1714, the tower was heightened, and in 1830 an octagonal spire with gables was added. In 1725, dormer windows were added to provide better lighting for the gallery.

=== Paintings ===
A unique feature of the church are 38 oil paintings, which completely cover the ceiling of the nave and the upper part of the walls. This use of paintings as an architectural feature is unusual for a Protestant church. The paintings, exclusively on biblical topics, were created from 1673 to 1678 by Michael Angelo Immenraedt from Antwerp and his assistant Johannes Melchior Bencard. Three paintings are based on designs by Joachim von Sandrart, and five were executed by his nephew Johann von Sandrart. Several paintings are based on well-known works by Rubens. For example, The Wedding at Cana on the south wall shows similarity to Rubens's painting The Feast of Herod, which hangs today in the Scottish National Gallery in Edinburgh.

The sequence of paintings aims to tell biblical stories to a partly illiterate congregation. The biblical figures are depicted in courtly Baroque garments. The painting Heimsuchung (Visitation) shows Mary arriving with a servant who carries her baggage on his head. Her cousin Elizabeth lives in a residence with a formal garden in the background. Johann of Nassau-Idstein had a formal garden at the Idstein residential palace, which was begun in 1646. The topics of the paintings in the center row of the ceiling are, from the altar to the back: Verklärung Christi am Tabor (Transfiguration), Kreuzaufrichtung (Elevation of the cross), Auferstehung (Resurrection), Kreuzabnahme (Descent from the Cross), Himmelfahrt (Ascension), and Johannes auf Patmos sieht den Himmel offen und die Engel mit dem Evangelium (Vision of St. John on Patmos, literally: John on Patmos sees heaven open and the angels with the Gospel).

Paintings before restoration:

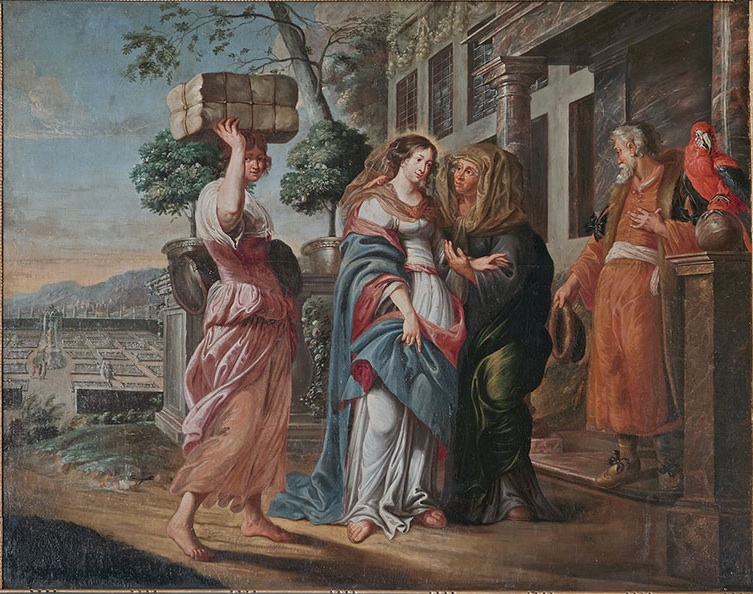
Visitation

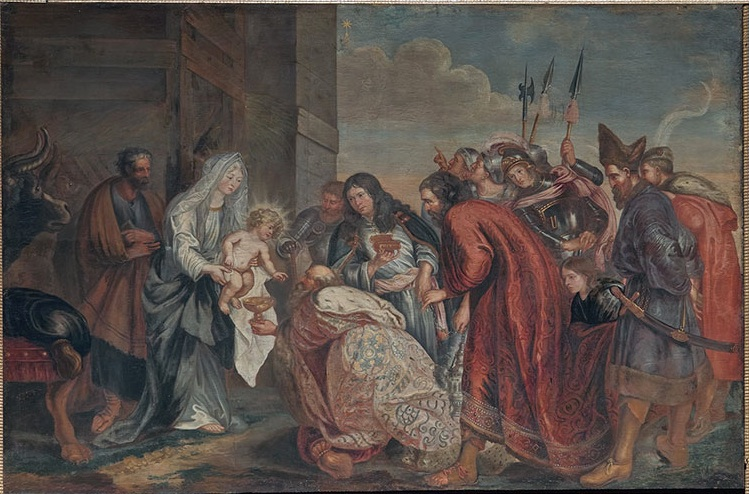
The Adoration of the Magi

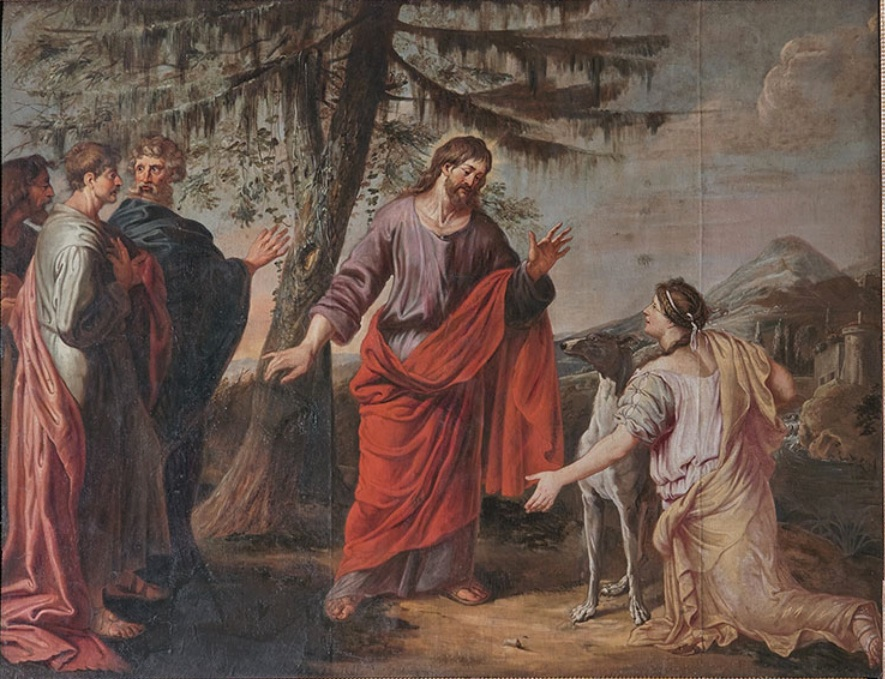
Jesus and the Woman of Canaan

Paintings after restoration, 2017:

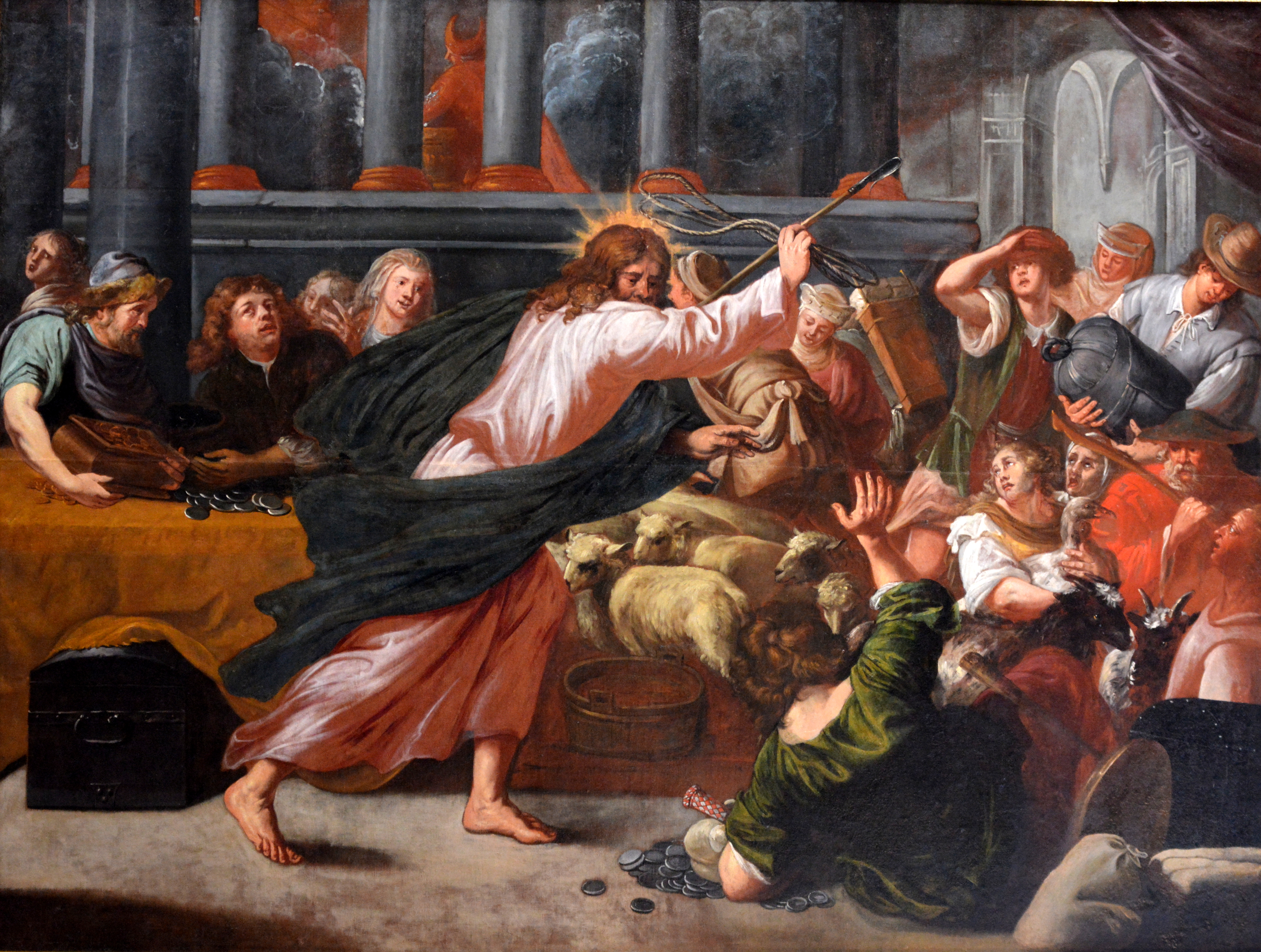
Cleansing of the Temple

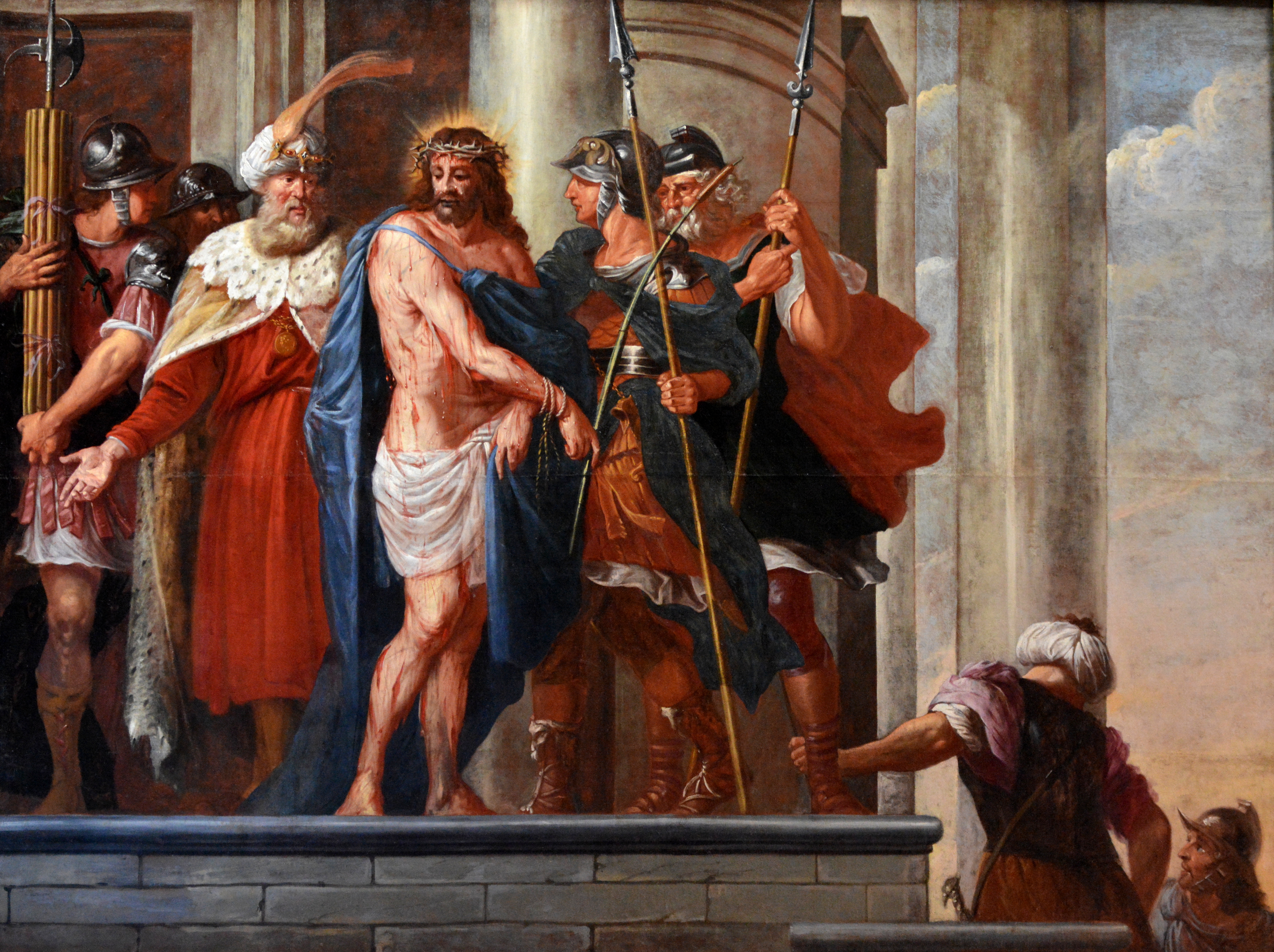
Ecce homo

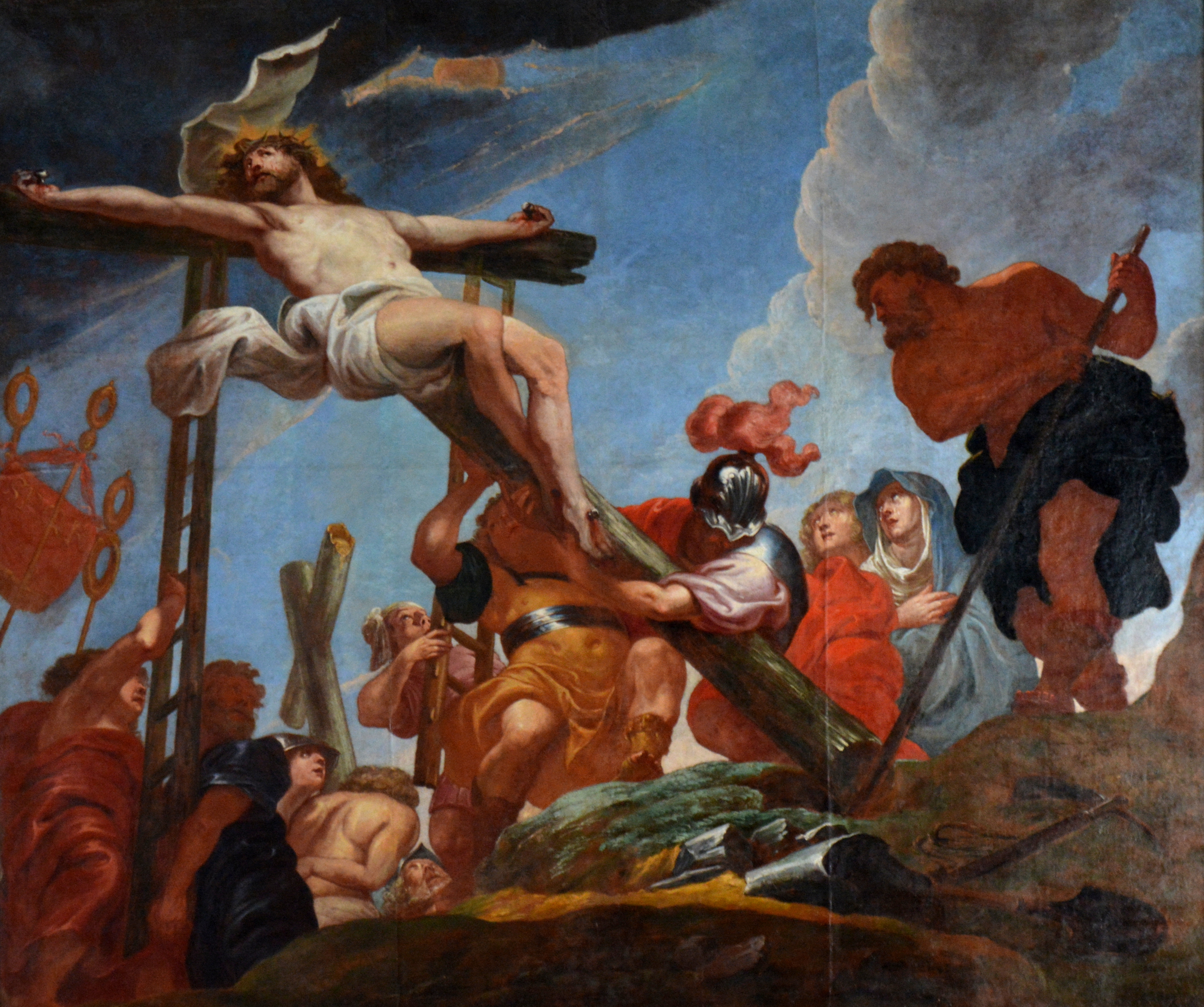
Descent from the Cross

=== Fittings and furniture ===
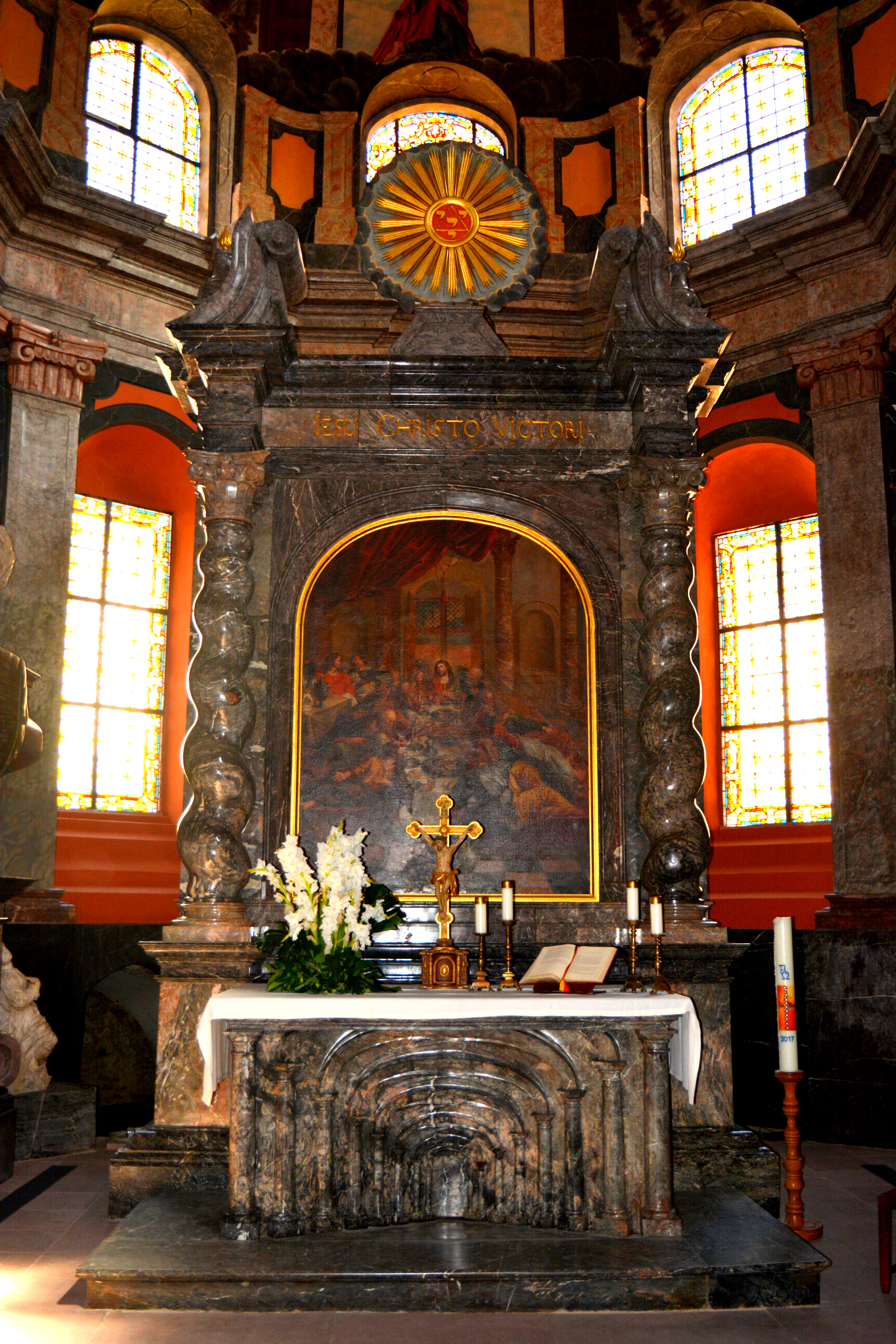
Altar

The marble altar was built in 1676 by Arnold Harnisch. It shows a painting of the Last Supper from the end of the 17th century. The marble pulpit was erected in 1673 by Christian Gaßmann and the baptismal font, also of marble, in 1675 by Martin Sattler.

Count Johann, infamous for his persecution of witches (Hexenverfolgung) as late as 1676, died shortly before the reconstruction of the church was completed. Franz Matthias Hiernle constructed an epitaph for Georg August Samuel von Nassau-Idstein, his wife Henriette Dorothea and their children, who are buried there. It was designed by Maximilian von Welsch and placed to the left of the altar.

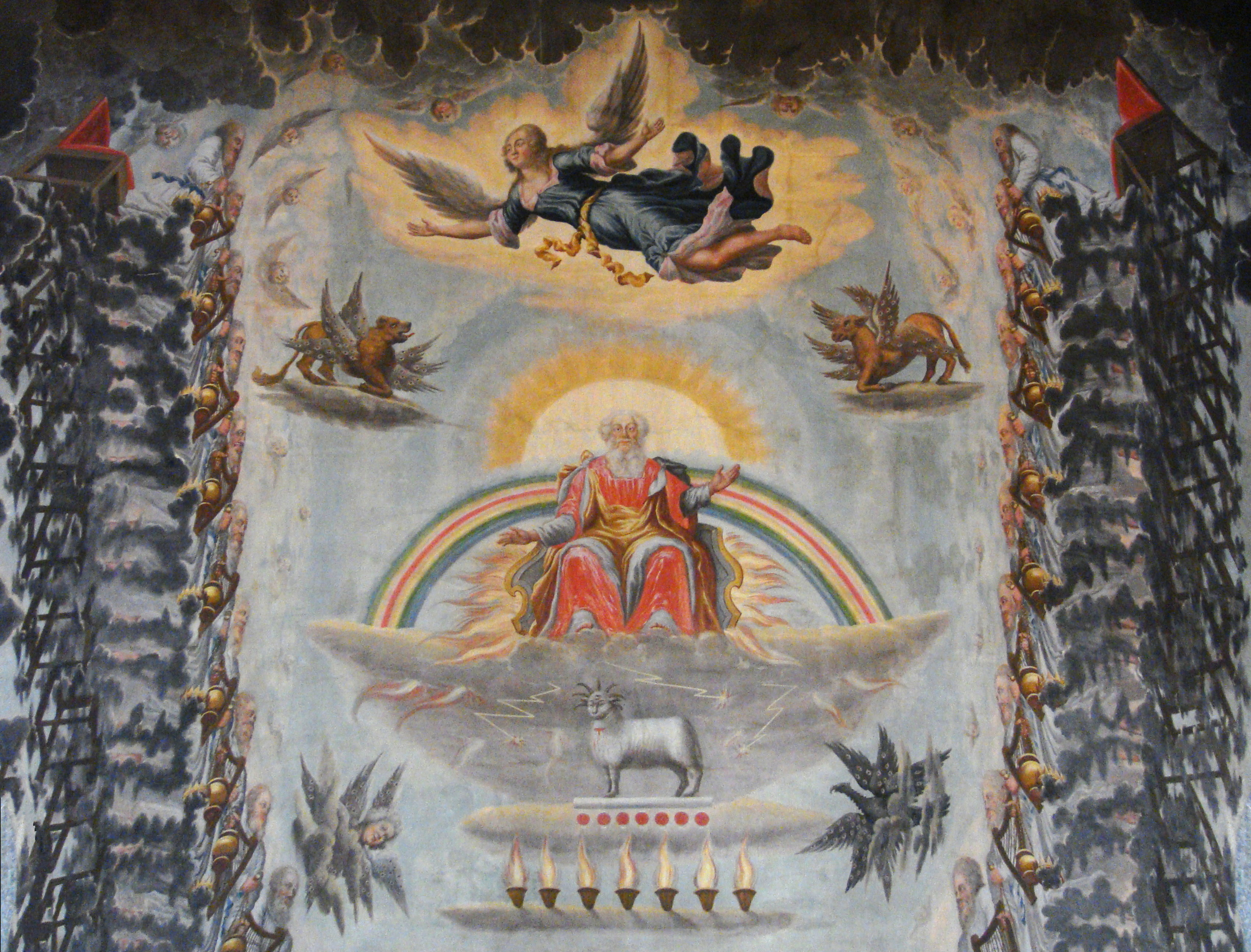
Ceiling above the altar, depicting a vision from the Book of Revelation

A 1725 fresco above the altar by Maximilian Pronner (Gießen) depicts a vision from the Book of Revelation as described by St. John (Revelation 5:12ff). George Frideric Handel set the same biblical passage to music as Worthy is the Lamb, to conclude his oratorio Messiah. In 1726, decorative wooden pillars in the shape of palm trees were installed. The lattice separating the elevated chancel was made by Johann Urban Zais.

Two crystal chandeliers hang above the main aisle. They date from the early 19th century and were originally installed in the old Kurhaus Wiesbaden.

=== Church union ===
The Protestant church was simply called the Stadtkirche (town church). The few remaining Catholics of Idstein were not permitted to hold services until 1806. They were then granted the right to use the Schlosskapelle (Palace Chapel) until 1888, when they moved to their own church. The Stadtkirche was renamed as the Unionskirche in 1917 to commemorate the centennial of the union of Lutheran and Reformed Protestants in the Duchy of Nassau in 1817 in the so-called "Nassauische Union", to form the Evangelische Kirche in Nassau (Protestant Church in Nassau). It was the first such union in Germany, 300 years after the Reformation.

=== Present day ===
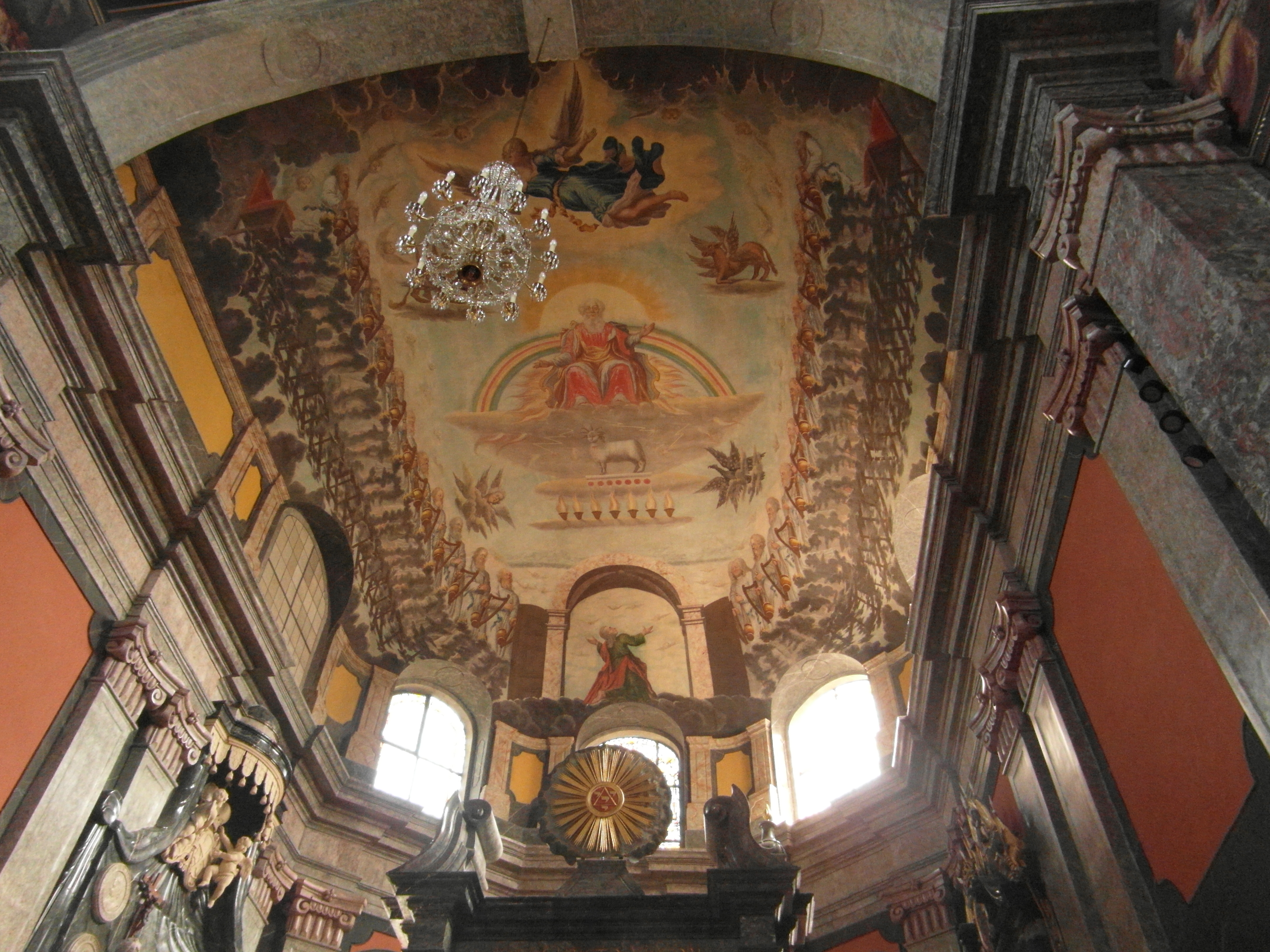
Ceiling above the altar after the restoration completed in 2017

The church is used by the Evangelische Kirchengemeinde Idstein (Protestant Congregation of Idstein), a member of the Evangelische Kirche in Hessen und Nassau. It is located in today's pedestrian area of the town. The congregation has been on good ecumenical terms with the Catholic parish St. Martin. Regular ökumenische Gottesdienste (ecumenical services) are held on the first Sunday in Advent (St. Martin) and Pentecost Monday (Unionskirche).

The congregation has participated in the civic partnership between Idstein and Moshi, Kilimanjaro, founded by Werner Schuster.

=== Restoration ===
The church underwent restoration from 2012 to 2017, when it celebrated 500 years since the Reformation and 200 years since the Union. The restoration included the paintings. In 2017, the parish was awarded the Hessischer Denkmalschutzpreis (Hessian monument preservation prize) from the Landesamt für Denkmalpflege.

== Historical assessment ==
The Landesamt für Denkmalpflege in Hessen, which cares for historic monuments in the state of Hesse, notes about the interior of the Unionskirche that firstly it follows the principles of a Protestant concept of church design, as they were first exemplified in the Hofkirche zu Torgau in 1544, with Martin Luther's approval. Secondly, the paintings are a distinct part of the architecture, as a rare and comparatively late example of evangelische Laiendogmatik (Protestant lay teaching) by painting. It is the first and heralding independent church-based creative structure ("erste und bedeutende eigenständige kirchliche Bauschöpfung") in Nassau after the Thirty Years' War.

== Music ==
=== Church music ===
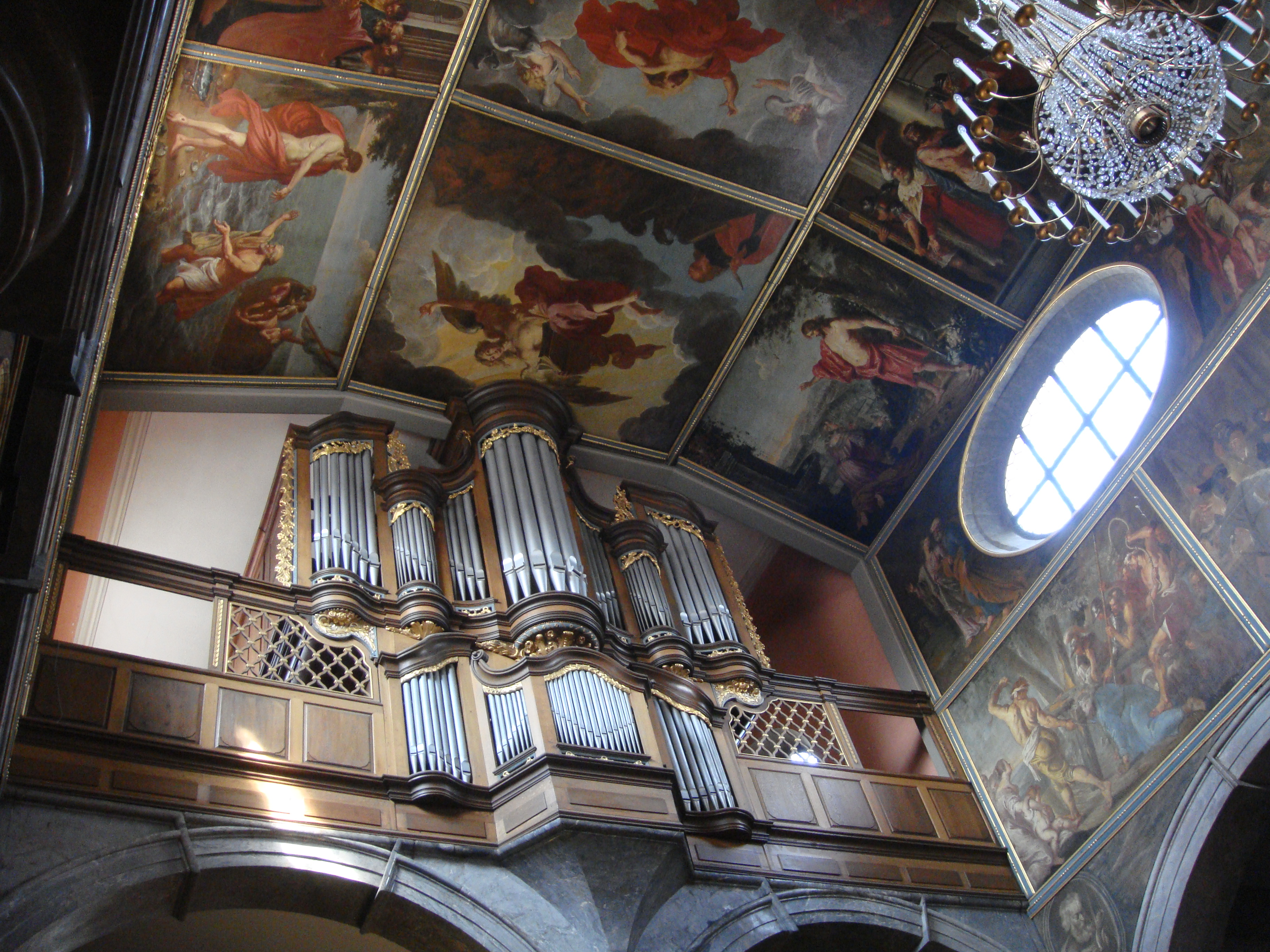
Walcker organ at ceiling

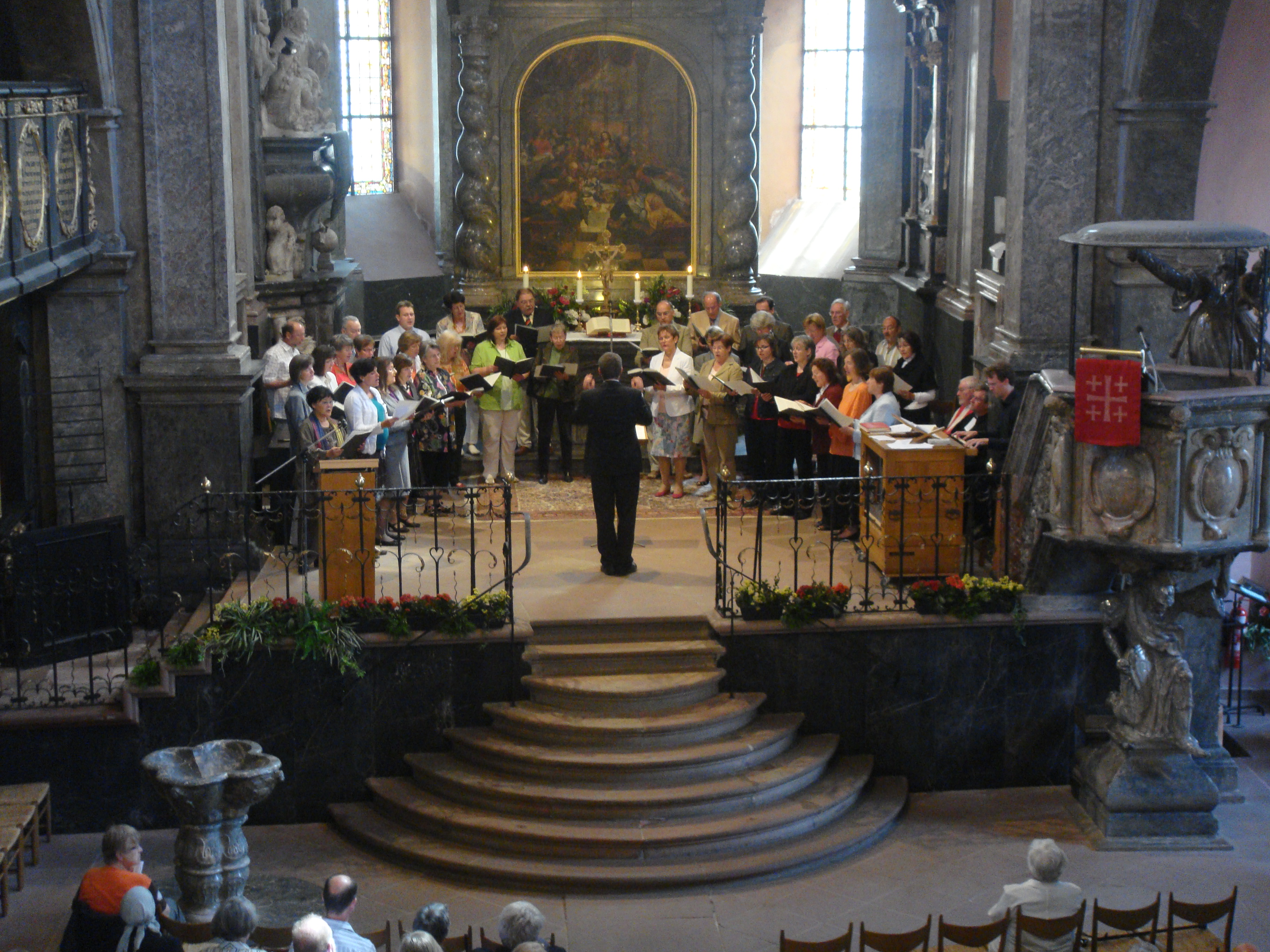
Chor St. Martin in the annual ecumenical service on Pentecost Monday, 2010

The organ, built in 1783 by Stumm, was replaced in 1912 by an instrument from Walcker, but retaining the historic case (Prospekt). The church choir, conducted by Edwin Müller, was named Idsteiner Kantorei in 1972 and started to perform two major concerts a year, in addition to services and concerts in smaller churches of the region. Müller was succeeded in 2003 by Carsten Koch, who also lectured at the Musikhochschule Frankfurt. Other musical groups at the Unionskirche are the Kinderkantorei (children's chorale), Jugendkantorei (youth chorale), Gospelchor (gospel choir), Flötenensemble (recorder ensemble) and Posaunenchor (trombone choir).

=== Concerts ===
The Unionskirche has been a venue of the Rheingau Musik Festival, especially for vocal music, such as a recital of Elizabeth Parcells and concerts of the vocal ensembles Chanticleer, ensemble amarcord and Die Singphoniker. In 2000 the Idsteiner Bachtage were held as an ecumenical collaboration of the Unionskirche and St. Martin. Concerts at the Unionskirche included the Brandenburg Concertos, cantata BWV 34 and the Missa in A.

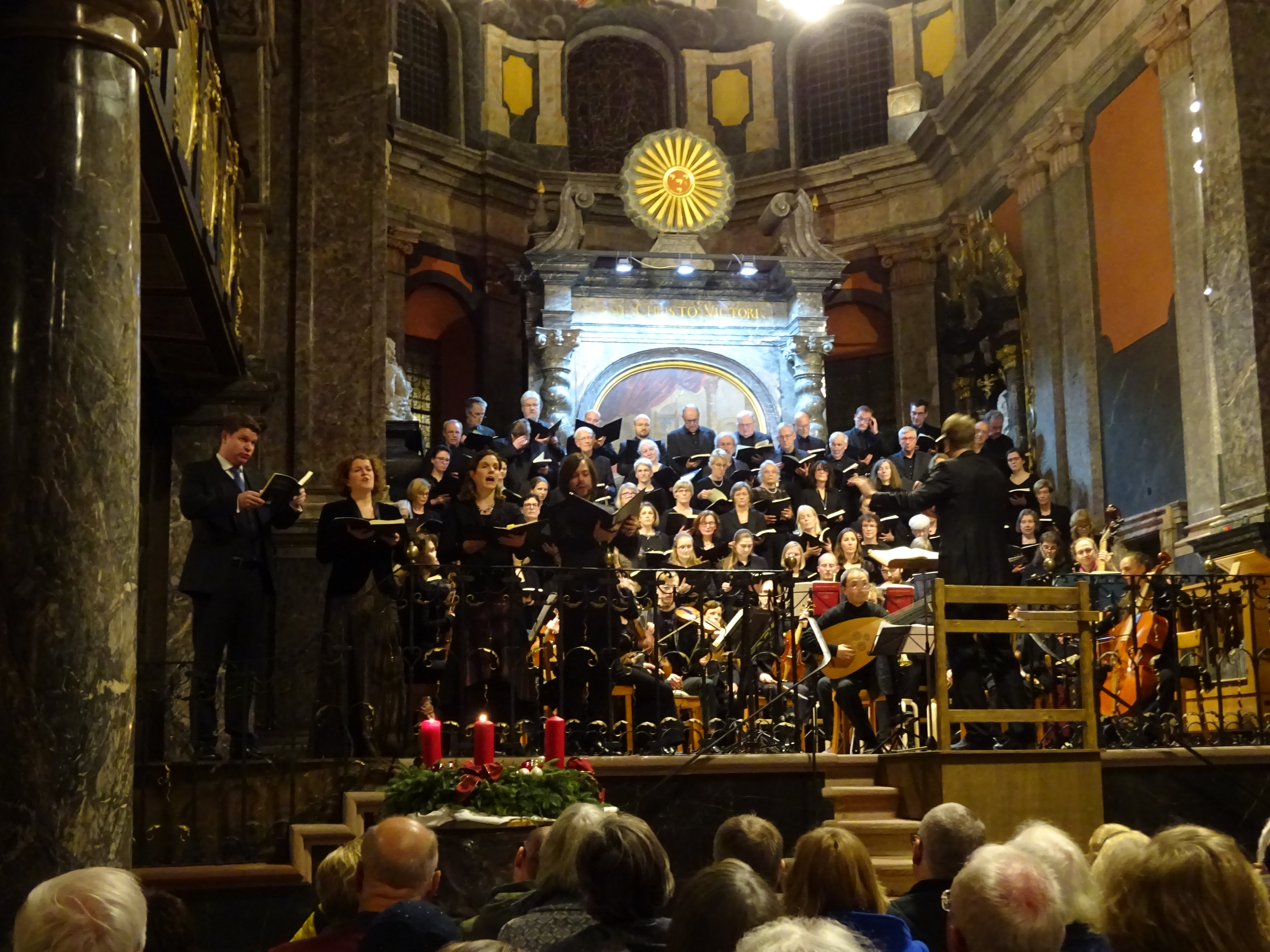
Idsteiner Kantorei performing Bach's Christmas Oratorio, Parts IV–VI, on 9 December 2018

Carsten Koch established a series of symphony concerts for the annual Tag des offenen Denkmals (European Heritage Day), beginning in 2004 a cycle of the symphonies of Beethoven. It was completed in 2012 with the Ninth Symphony. This concert on 9 September, during a "Jubiläumswoche der Kirchenmusik" (anniversary week of church music), was also part of the celebration of anniversaries marking 100 years with the Walcker organ and 40 years with the Idsteiner Kantorei. In addition to the standard choral repertoire, Koch has selected rarely performed works such as Schumann's Missa sacra on 9 November 2008. In 2011 the choir performed Mendelssohn's Lobgesang. In 2017, the first concert after restoration was dedicated to contemporary music including Ola Gjeilo's Sunrise Mass and Eric Whitacre's Five Hebrew Love Songs. In 2018, Bach's complete Christmas Oratorio was performed in two concerts in ecumenical collaboration.

== Burials ==
Several members of the court were buried in the church:

- Walram IV, Count of Nassau-Idstein
- Philip I, Count of Nassau-Wiesbaden-Idstein
- John, Count of Nassau-Idstein
- George August, Count of Nassau-Idstein
- Charles Louis, Count of Nassau-Saarbrücken
- Adolph II, Count of Nassau-Wiesbaden-Idstein
- Balthasar, Count of Nassau-Wiesbaden-Idstein
- John Louis I, Count of Nassau-Wiesbaden-Idstein

== Literature ==
- Göbel, Karl G.: Die Bildzyklen in der Idsteiner Stadtkirche (Unionskirche) und ihre Bedeutung, in: NassA 118 (2007), p. 341–384
- Schmidt, Karl Heinz: Grüfte und Sarkophage in der Unionskirche zu Idstein, in: NassA 107 (1996), p. 79
- Pons, Rouven: Für Kunst und Glauben. Die Ausmalung der Martinskirche in Idstein unter Graf Johannes von Nassau-Idstein (1603-1677), Wiesbaden 2012 (Veröffentlichtungen der Historischen Kommission für Nassau 83).
