= Carsten Koch =

Carsten Koch may refer to:

- Carsten Koch (musician) (born 1975), German organist, choral conductor and academic
- Carsten Koch (politician) (born 1945), Danish economist and former Social Democratic politician and minister
