= Exorcism of the Syrophoenician woman's daughter =

Miracle of Jesus

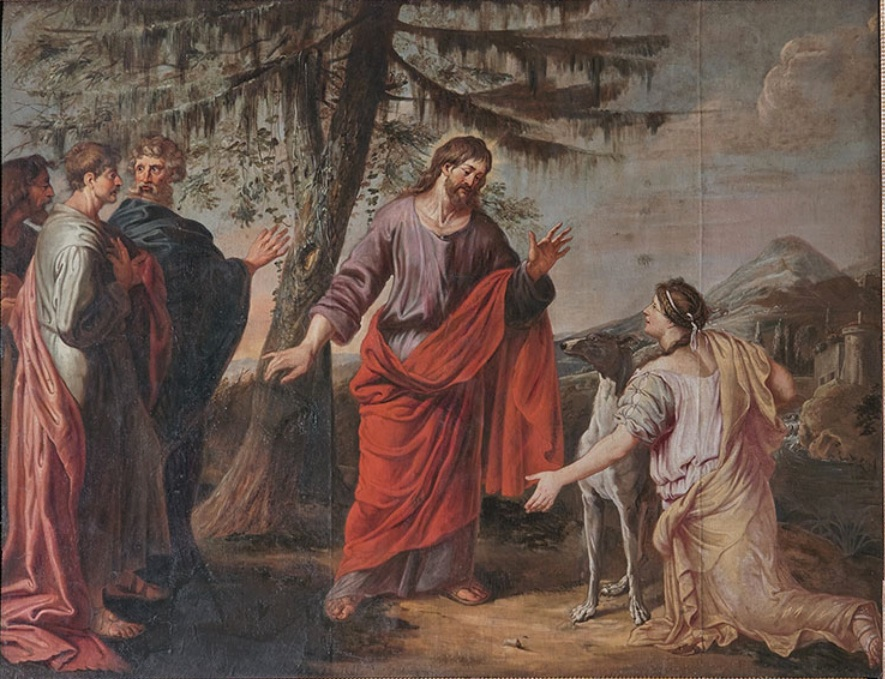
The Woman of Canaan by Michael Angelo Immenraet, 17th century

The exorcism of the Syrophoenician woman's daughter is one of the miracles of Jesus and is recounted in the Gospel of Mark in chapter 7 (Mark 7:24–30) and in the Gospel of Matthew in chapter 15 (Matthew 15:21–28). In Matthew, the story is recounted as the healing of a Canaanite woman's daughter. According to both accounts, Jesus exorcised the woman's daughter whilst travelling in the region of Tyre and Sidon, on account of the faith shown by the woman.

The third-century pseudo-Clementine homily refers to her name as Justa and her daughter's name as Berenice.

In art, one or more dogs (otherwise unusual in New Testament scenes) are very often shown; Tobias and the Angel is the only other biblical subject in art to typically include a dog. More rarely the stricken daughter is seen.

== Passage ==
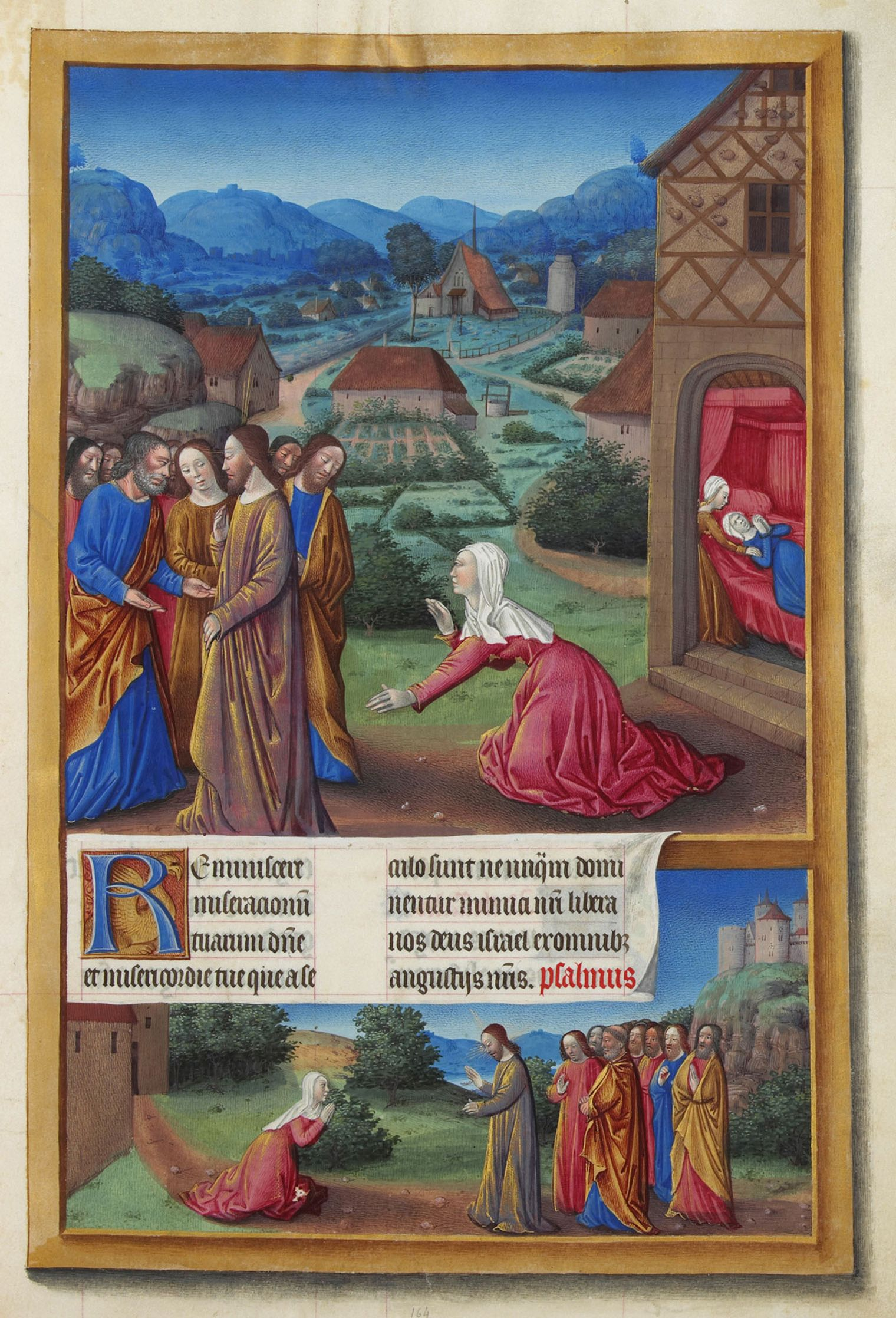
Jesus exorcising the Canaanite Woman's daughter. From Très Riches Heures du Duc de Berry, 15th century

The relevant passage in Matthew 15:22–28 reads as follows:

Just then a Canaanite woman from that region came out and started shouting, "Have mercy on me, Lord, Son of David; my daughter is tormented by a demon." But he did not answer her at all. And his disciples came and urged him, saying, "Send her away, for she keeps shouting after us." He answered, "I was sent only to the lost sheep of the house of Israel." But she came and knelt before him, saying, "Lord, help me." He answered, "It is not fair to take the children's food and throw it to the dogs." She said, "Yes, Lord, yet even the dogs eat the crumbs that fall from their masters' table." Then Jesus answered her, "Woman, great is your faith! Let it be done for you as you wish." And her daughter was healed instantly.

Many English translations of the Gospels state that Jesus was in the region of Tyre and Sidon and had withdrawn from Galilee where he had entered in discussion with the Pharisees over their interpretation of the Jewish law. The Geneva Bible and the King James Version suggest that the visit was to the coast (i.e. the Mediterranean Sea), but the Cambridge Bible for Schools and Colleges argues that Jesus went to "the neighbourhood, [or] district, not the sea-shore, as might be thought".

This episode is, according to Graham H. Twelftree, an example of how Jesus emphasizes the value of faith, as also shown in the Healing the Centurion's servant episode.

== Syrophoenician woman ==
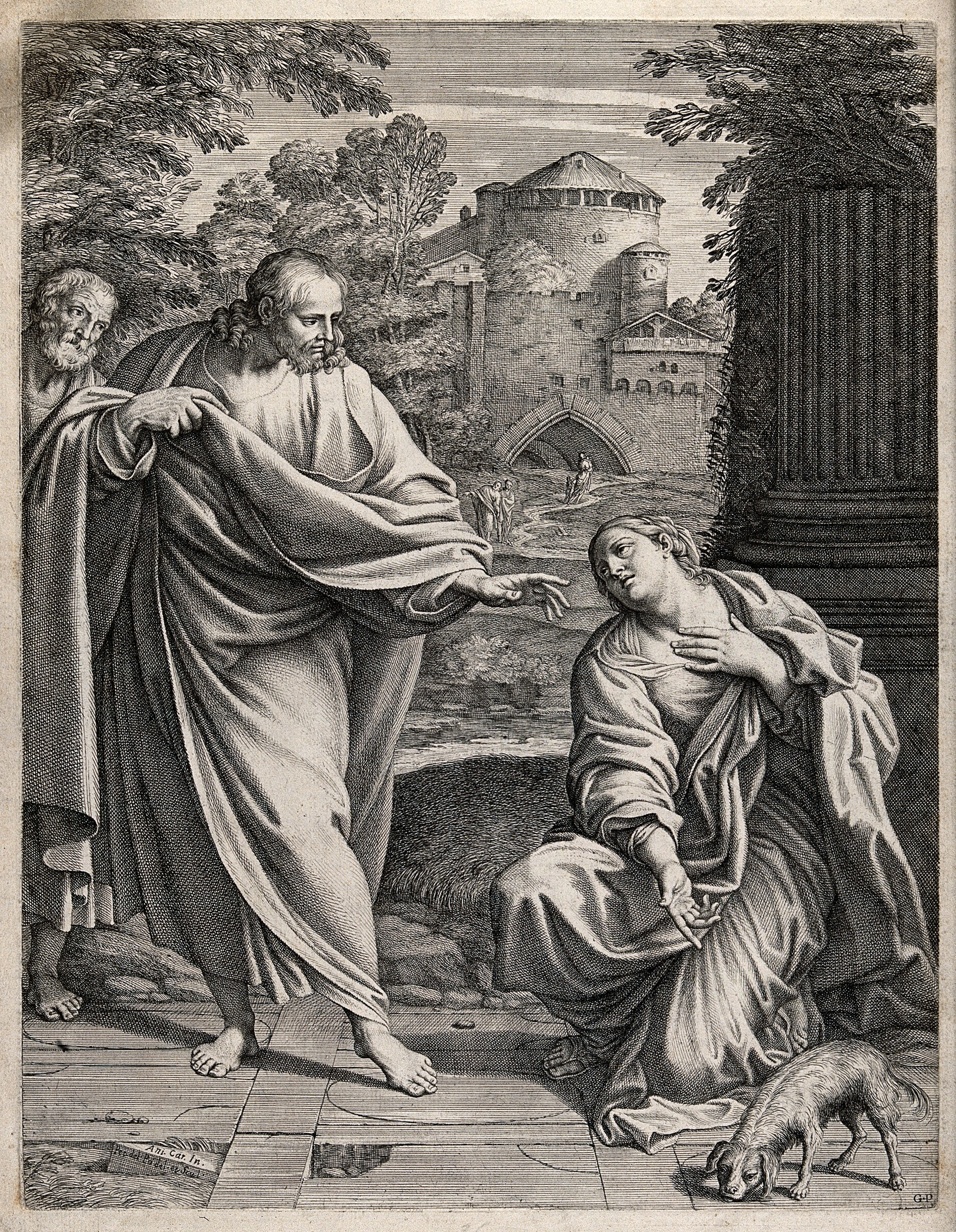
Etching by Pietro del Po, The Canaanite (or Syrophoenician) woman asks Christ to cure, c. 1650

The woman described in the miracle, the Syrophoenician woman (Mark 7:26; Συροφοινίκισσα, Syrophoinikissa) is also called a "Canaanite" (Matthew 15:22; Χαναναία, Chananaia) and is an unidentified New Testament woman from the region of Tyre and Sidon. "The woman is [...] described as Syrophoenician by race. It is unclear whether Mark seeks to distinguish between a Phoenician from Syria and one from North Africa or between someone living in the coastal area of Syria and someone living in the central part."

The Gospel of Mark describes the woman as "Gentile" or "Greek", while the Gospel of Matthew identifies her as a "Canaanite". "Canaanite" could be interpreted as a deliberate rhetorical device because they did not literally exist as a recognizable ethnicity in 1st century CE Judea. In Jewish literature, Canaanites were synonymous with "the opponent" and "idolatry", even if the person was of Israelite descent.

== Commentary ==
Thomas Aquinas comments on this passage in his homily on the sinful soul, saying,

Five things are noted of this woman of Canaan which availed for the liberation of this demoniac. (1) Humility: "Yet the dogs eat." (2) Her patience, since she patiently endured the seeming reproaches of Our Lord. (3) Her prayer, "Have mercy on me, O Lord." (4) Her perseverance: she did not cease asking till she obtained what she desired. (5) Her faith: "O woman, great is thy faith." If we had had these five qualities we should be delivered from every devil, that is, from all sin; which may Christ grant us to be. Amen.

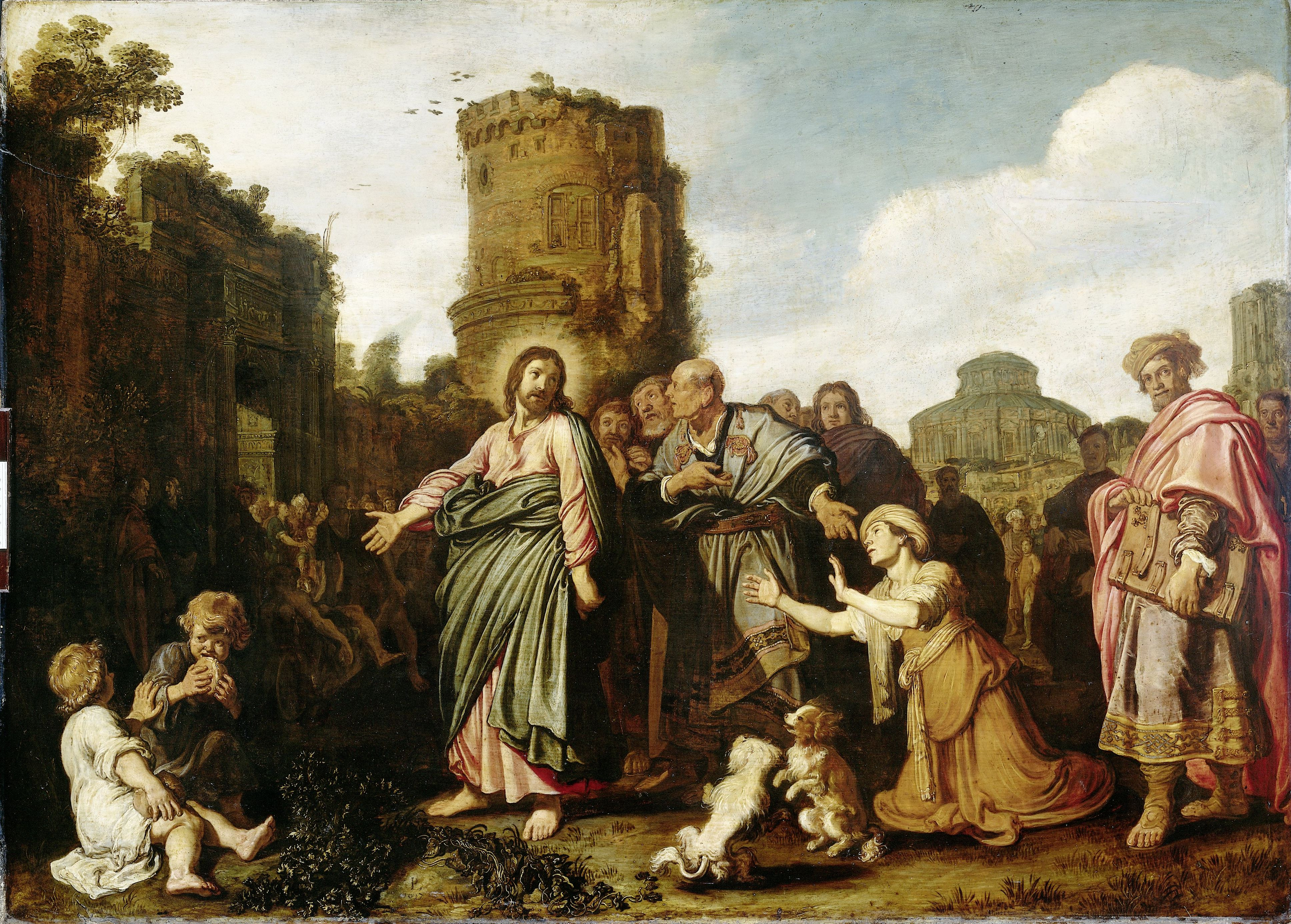
Christ and the Woman from Canaan by Pieter Lastman, 1617, Rijksmuseum

Charles Ellicott contrasts this miracle with the miraculous healing of the centurion's servant in Matthew 8:10. According to Ellicott, whilst both miracles showed Jesus's willingness to help Gentiles, Jesus had a more favorable view of the centurion. Compared to the Syrophoenician woman, the centurion behaved like the proselyte of the gate, due to his contributions in building a synagogue and moral conduct, which was commended by Jewish elders. Meanwhile, the Syrophoenician woman made no attempt to show she was a true convert. Ellicott also links Jesus's hostility to the curse of Canaan in Genesis 9:25 since Syrophoenicians descended from Canaan. Nonetheless, Matthew 4:24 shows Jesus's receptivity to Syrians, including those that did not openly profess their faith. According to Chrysostom, the Syrians demonstrated their strong faith by directly bringing their sick to him.

Mookgo S. Kgatle describes the Syrophoenician woman as a social activist against traditional Jewish views about gender, purity and ethnicity. However, she accepts the reality of her outsider status when it came to membership in God's chosen people. Kgatle notes that ancient Jewish culture used 'dog' to describe enemies of Israel, regardless of background, and also, generic contempt, unworthiness, religious profanity or alternatively, humility. He also says that the author of the Gospel of Matthew deliberately changed the woman's ethnicity from Syrophoenician to Canaanite to show that she was "unclean and pagan" and the presence of an "Israel-centered conflict" between her and Judeans.

== Gallery ==
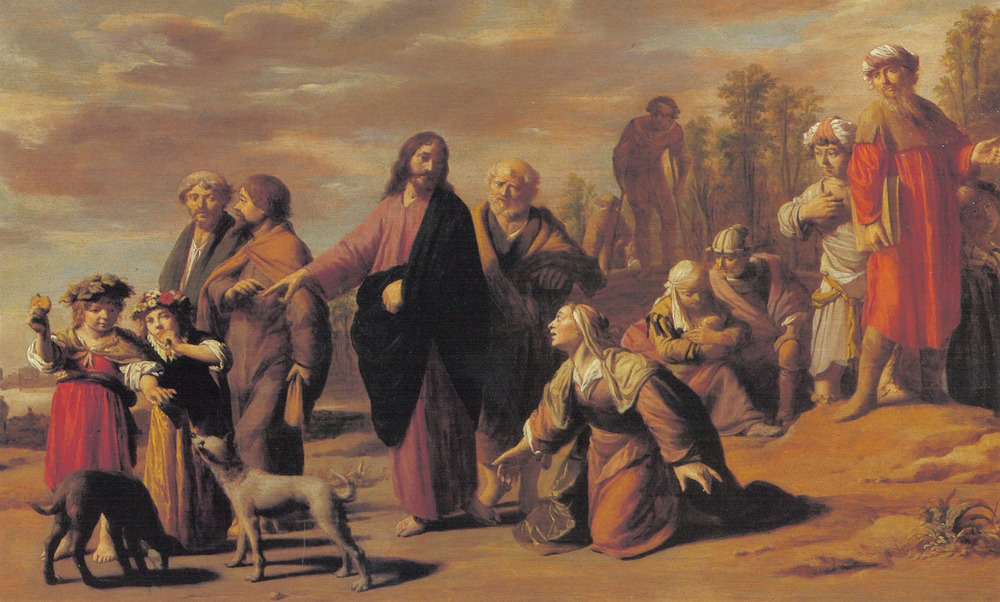
A Canaanite woman begs Jesus to heal her daughter, Willem van Oordt, 1645–1650

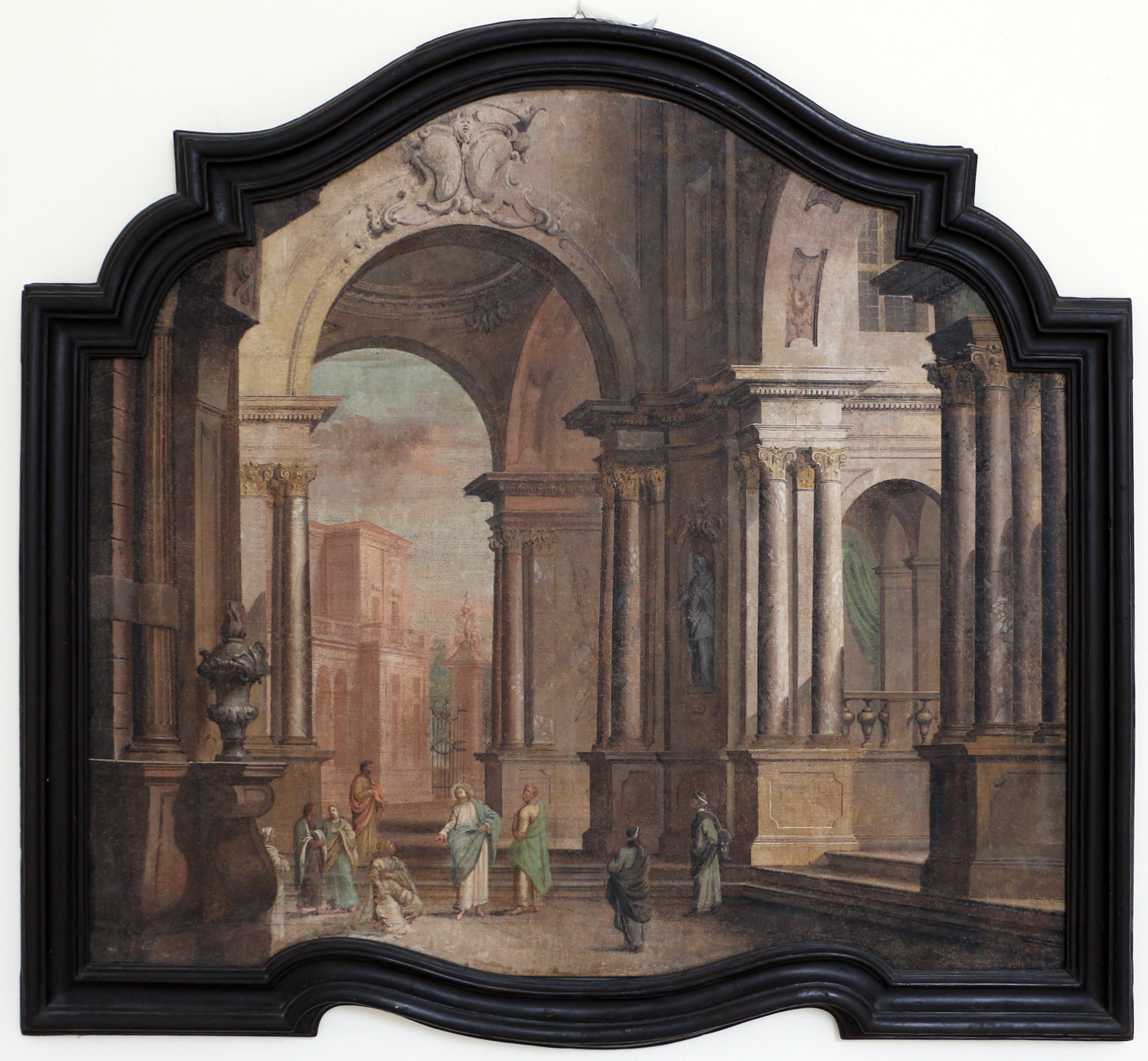
Perspective with Christ and the Canaanite woman, Emilian, Ravenna Art Museum

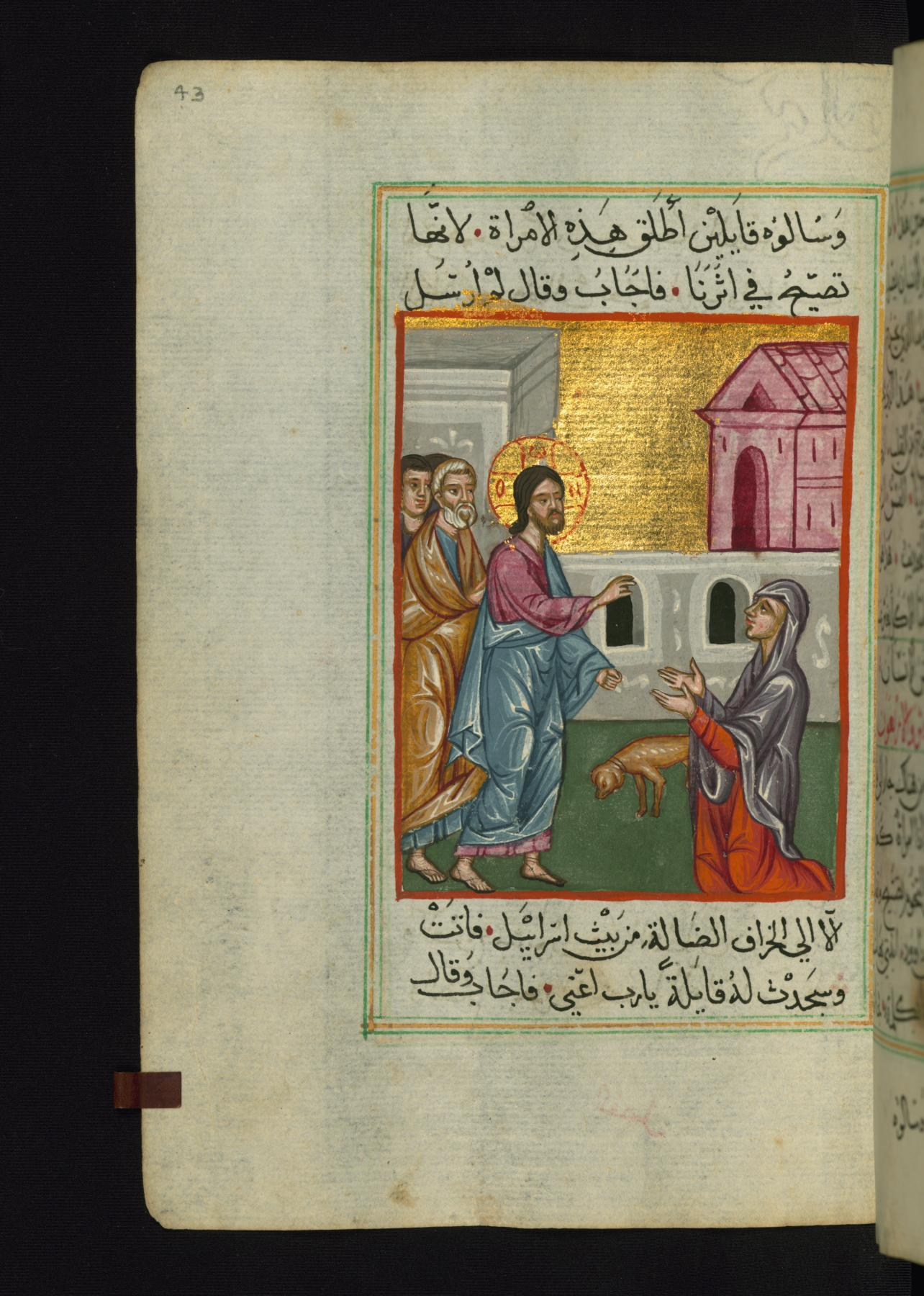
Jesus and the Canaanite Woman by Ilyas Basim Khuri Bazzi Rahib, 1684

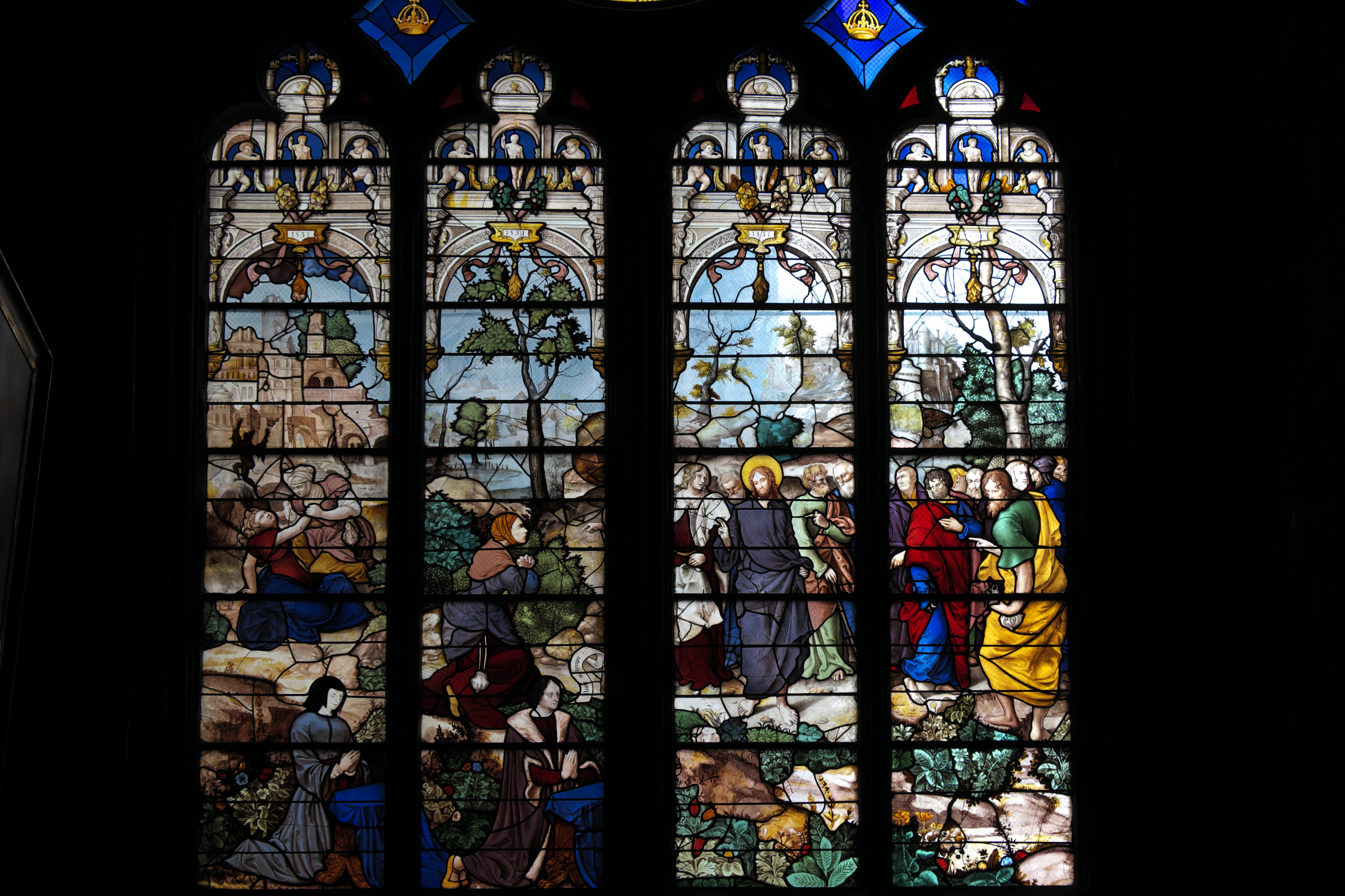
Stained glass from Bayonne Cathedral, France

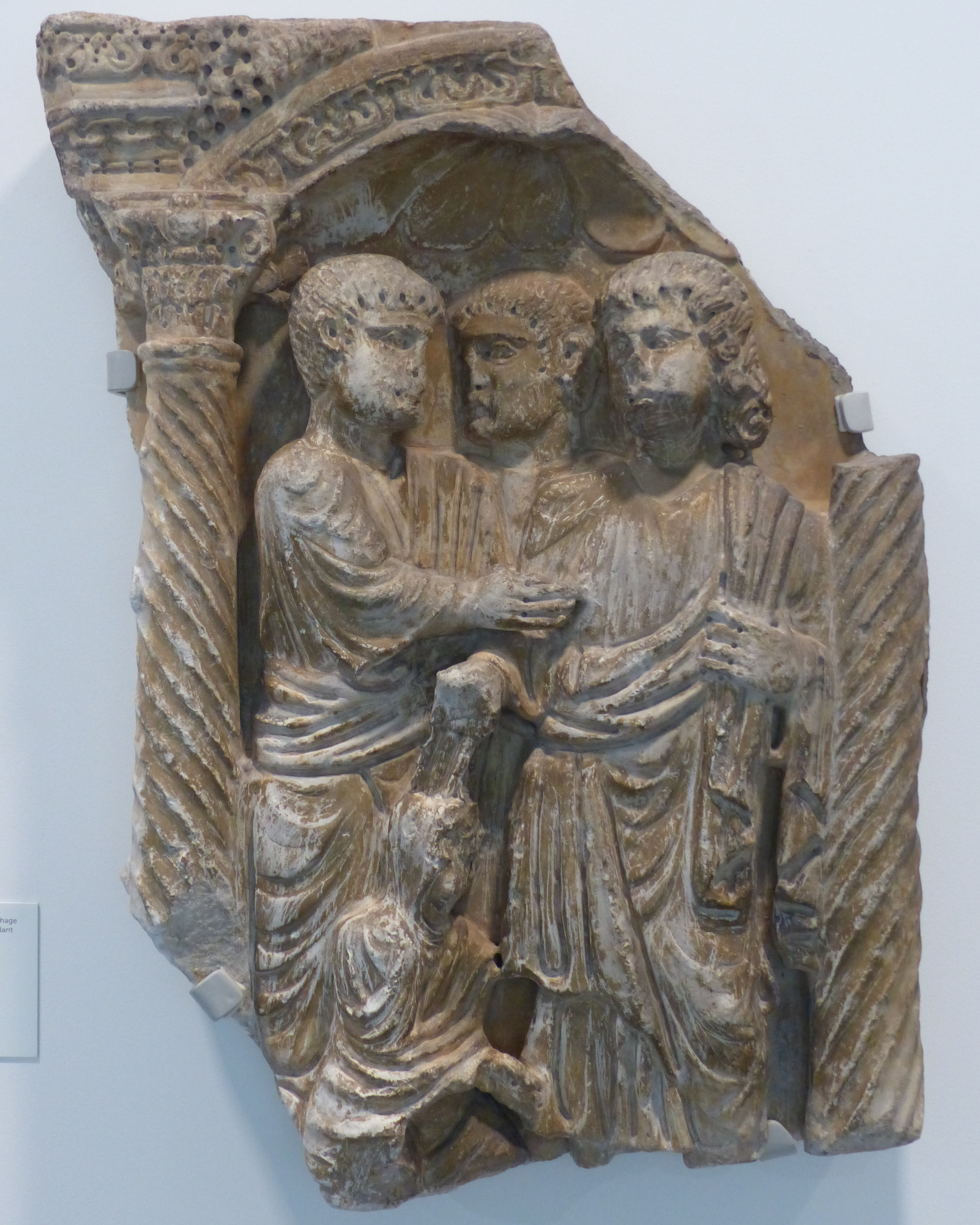
4th-century sarcophagus, Nimes museum

== See also ==
- Life of Jesus in the New Testament
- Ministry of Jesus
- Miracles of Jesus
- Parables of Jesus
- Perfection of Christ
- 1st century in Lebanon
- Asian feminist theology
