= Johanna Vergouwen =

Dutch artist (1630–1714)

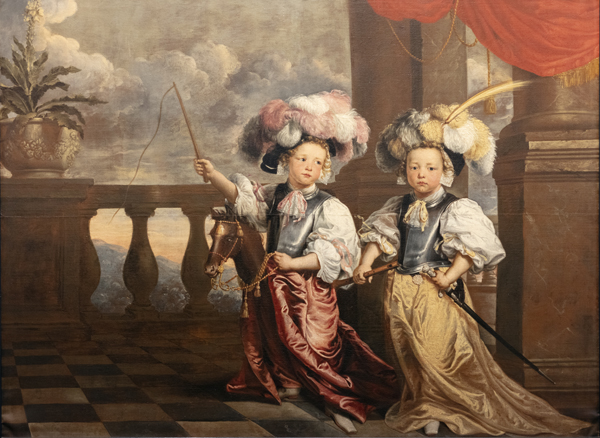
Portrait of twins, 1668.

Johanna Vergouwen (also: Jeanne Vergouwen or Joanna Vergouwen) (1630 in Antwerp – 11 March 1714 in Antwerp) was a Flemish Baroque painter and copyist.

== Life ==
She was brought up in a family of painters. She was the daughter of the Flemish painter-decorator Louis Vergouwen (died 1659) and his wife Maaike Verwerff, who was the daughter of the painter Hans Verwerff. Her sister Maria (died 1664) married the painter Michael Angelo Immenraet in 1661. Immenraet and Joanna Vergouwen engaged in extensive litigation regarding her sister's inheritance.

She studied with Balthazar van den Bossche and Lucas van Uden. She was active as a painter, copyist and art dealer.

The 17th century Flemish biographer Cornelis de Bie refers to her in his Het Gulden Cabinet in the chapter on noteworthy female painters. He describes her as a copyist of Anthony van Dyck and Rubens.

== Works ==
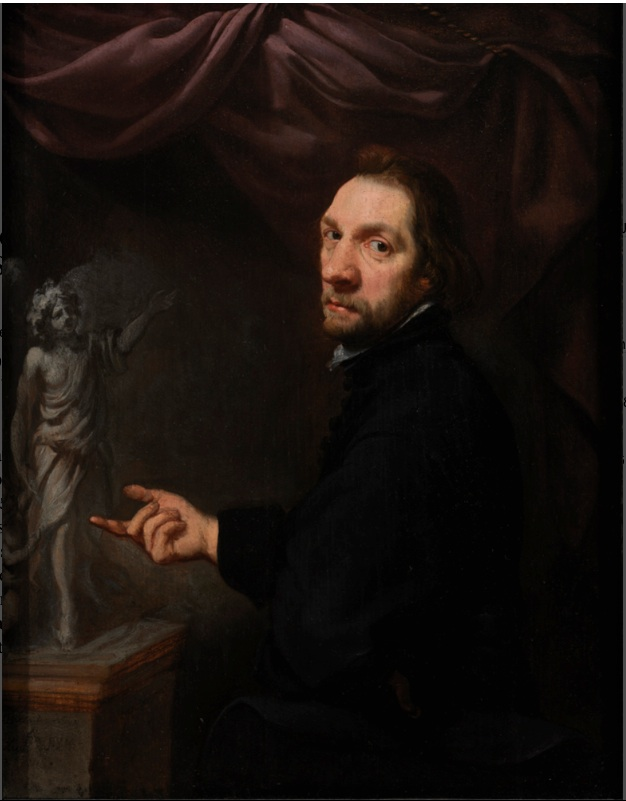
Portrait of Andries Rademaker, Notary, Displaying a Statuette, 1656

- Portrait of Andries Rademaker, Notary, Displaying a Statuette, oil on panel, 1656, Rhode Island School of Design Museum.
- A double portrait of two boys, full-length, dressed as knights, one holding a flute, the other on a hobby-horse holding a whip, both standing on a balcony, oil on canvas, 1668, Christie's Amsterdam, sold 6 May 2008 for €120,250, lot nr. 180
- Samson and Delilah, 1673, copy of a picture by Anthony van Dyck, Mexico, Museo Nacional de San Carlo.

== Bibliography ==
E. Duverger, "The Antwerp painter Joanna Vergouwen (1630–1714)" Jaarboek van het Koninklijk Museum voor Schone Kunsten, Antwerp, 2000.
