= Wojciech Rajski =

Polish conductor

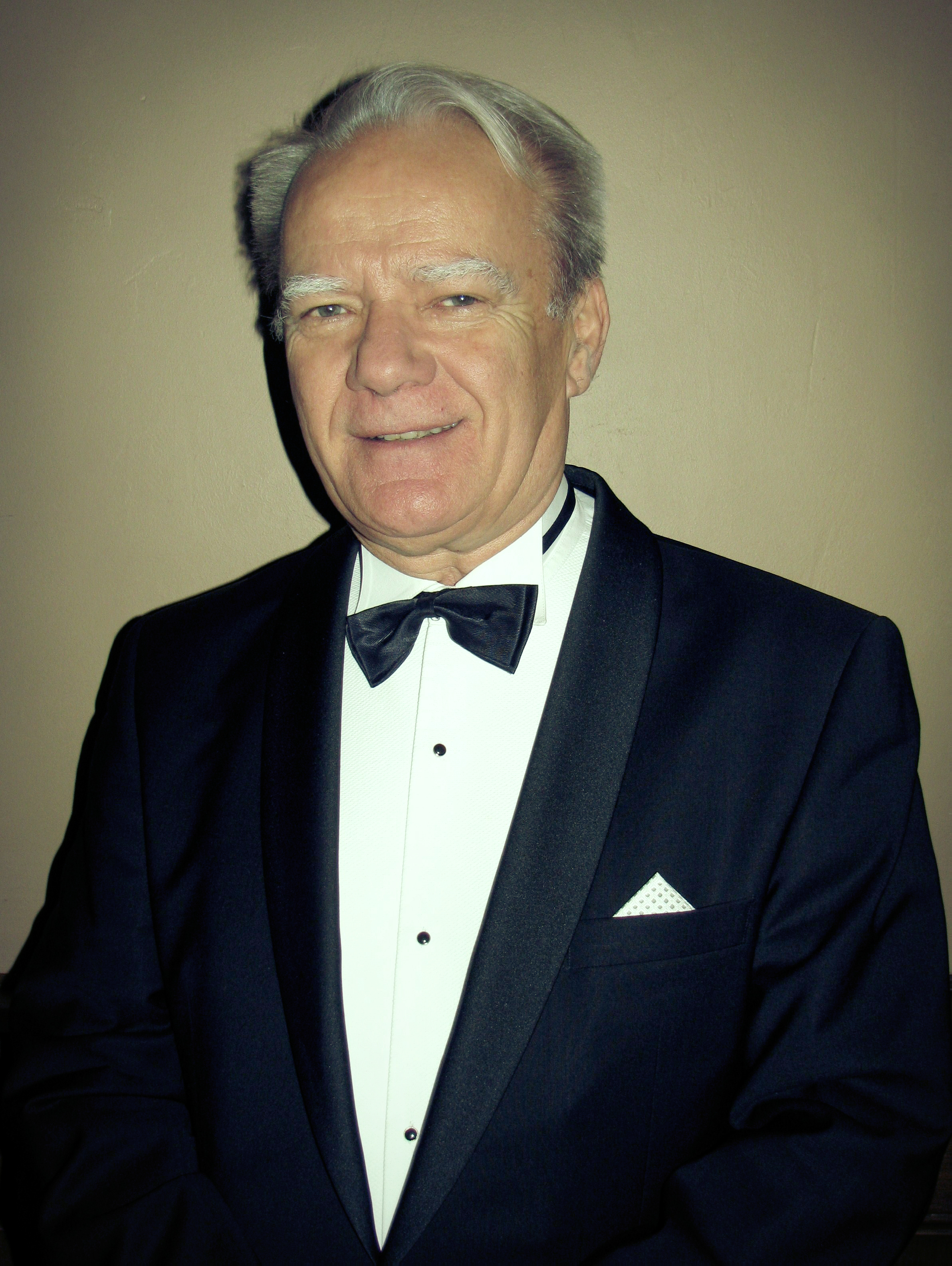
Wojciech Rajski, 2016

Wojciech Rajski (born 9 July 1948) is a Polish conductor, and the founder and current Artistic Director of the Polish Chamber Philharmonic Orchestra Sopot. His recordings can be heard on such labels as Deutsche Grammophon, Dux Records, and EMI Classics.
