= Michael Angelo Immenraet =

Flemish painter

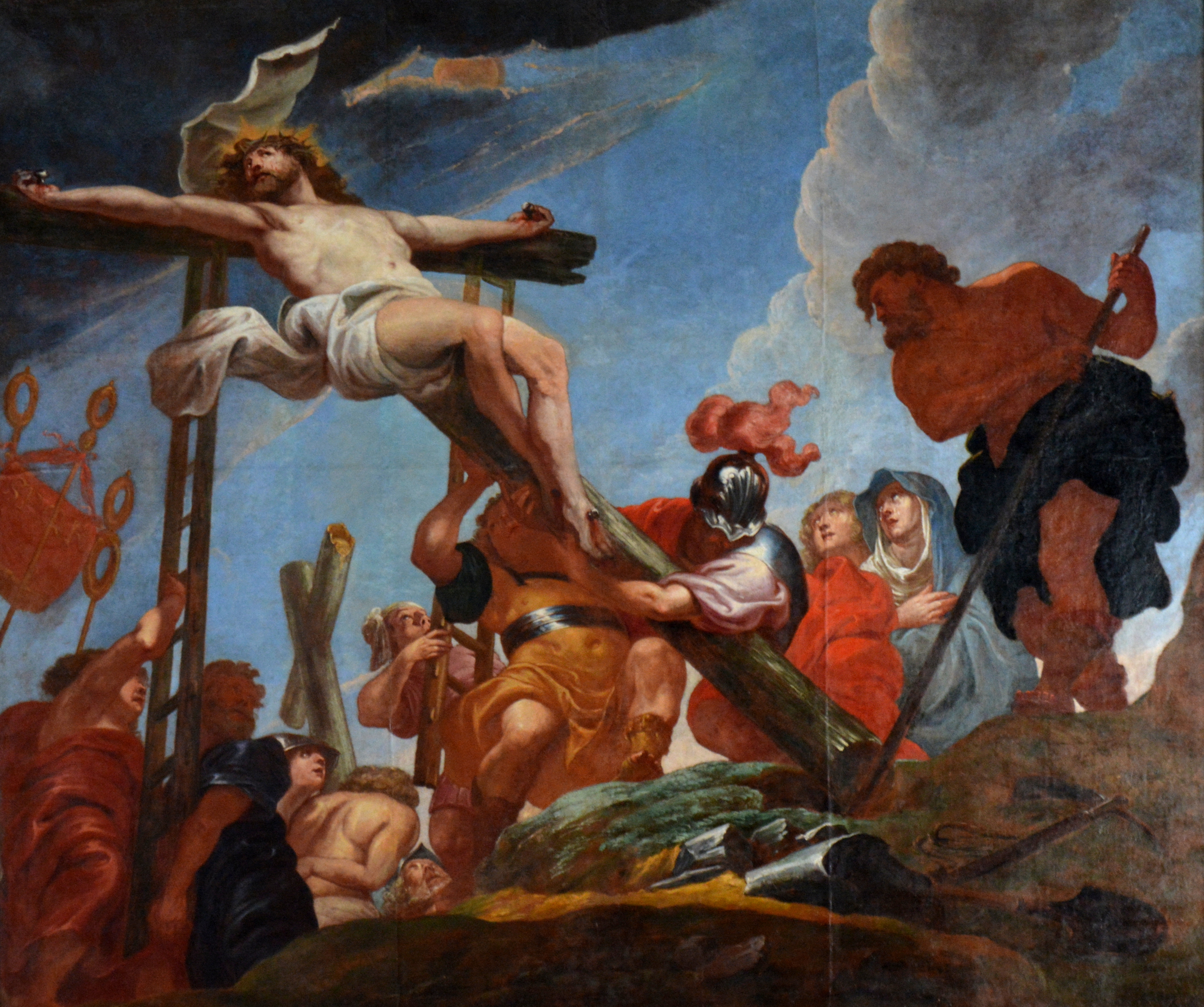
The elevation of the Cross, Unionskirche

Michael Angelo Immenraet (1621–1683) was a Flemish history and portrait painter who is mainly remembered for a lavish Baroque painting series of biblical scenes that he produced for the Unionskirche, Idstein in Germany.

== Life ==
Philips Augustijn Immenraet was born on 18 October 1621 in Antwerp. His father was an immigrant German piano builder, and his younger brother, Philips Augustijn Immenraet, was a successful landscape painter. It is not clear with whom he trained but on the basis of his style he is often regarded as a painter from the school of Peter Paul Rubens.

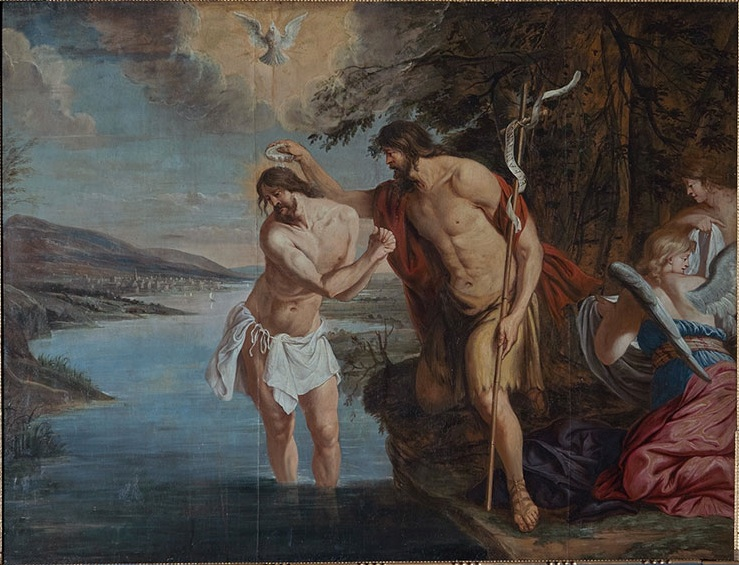
The Baptism in the Jordan, Unionskirche

Immenraet married Maria Vergouwen, the sister of the painter Johanna Vergouwen on 8 February 1661. The couple had three daughters. His wife died in 1664 after giving birth to their third child. Immenraet and his sister-in-law Johanna Vergouwen engaged in extensive legislation regarding the inheritance of his deceased wife. On 26 November 1665, he married Margaretha Corthals and after her death he married a third time to Maria Brouwers. He had four daughters and two sons from the three marriages.

In 1661, Immenraet painted a chimney piece in The Hague for the 'Hofje van Nieuwkoop', a housing project for poor widows funded from the inheritance of Johan de Bruijn van Buijtewech, a rich citizen of The Hague. The chimney piece represents the double portrait of Odilia and Philippina Maria van Wassenaer, the nieces of van Buijtewech and two first governesses of the project. The two young governesses are depicted as shepherdesses.

He was registered in the Antwerp Guild of Saint Luke in 1663.

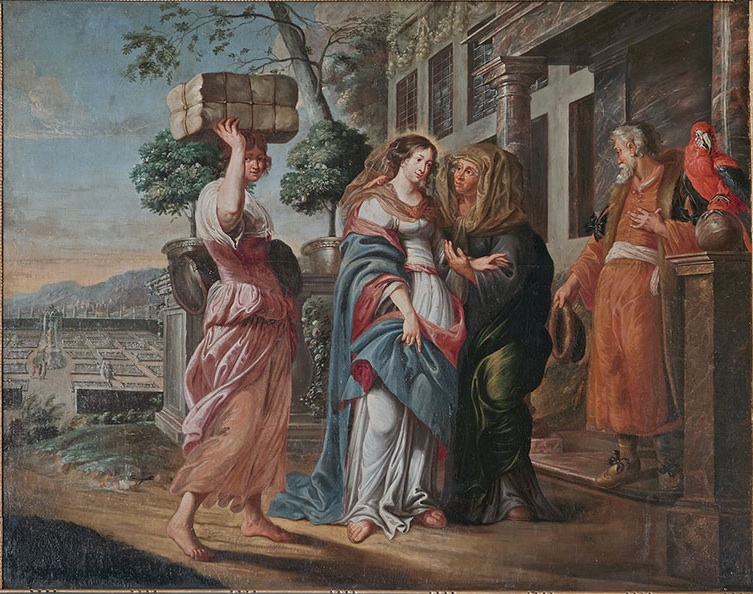
The Visitation, Unionskirche

He worked in Germany for a period from 1673 and 1678. Together with Johann Caspar Bencard, his pupil or assistant, Immenraet was responsible for 38 of the oil on canvas paintings decorating the ceiling of the Unionskirche, Idstein.

Little is known about his later years. He died in Utrecht in 1683.

== Work ==
Michel Angelo Immenraet painted allegorical, history, religious and genre scenes as well as portraits. Aside from the painting cycle in the Unionskirche, Idstein, not many of his works are known.

His earliest known work is the Double portrait of Odilia and Philippina Maria van Wassenaer as Shepherdesses of 1661 ('Hofje van Nieuwkoop', The Hague). The portrait depicts the two young governesses of the 'Hofje van Nieuwkoop' as shepherdesses in an Arcadian landscape. This type of idealized representation was in vogue in the Dutch Republic at the time.

The best-known works from his oeuvre is a series of 38 paintings, which he realized with the assistance of Johann Caspar Bencard, for the ceiling of the Unionskirche, Idstein. The commission was given by Johann of Nassau-Idstein (1603–77), who wished to turn the existing church into a Baroque "Predigt- und Hofkirche" (sermon and court church) after the Thirty Years' War. The Dutch painters Joachim von Sandrart and his nephew Johann von Sandrart also created paintings for the church. The difficulty for the artists was to create a language that corresponded to Lutheran sensitivities. The programme of works all represent scenes from the Bible without any depictions of saints as would typically have been the case in a Catholic church. The works represented the stories from the Bible as ever present, living realities. The Biblical figures are dressed in courtly Baroque garments. The painting of the "Visitation" shows Mary arriving with a servant who carries her cases on his head. Saint Elisabeth's residence with its formal garden in the background resembles the Idstein residential palace of Johann of Nassau-Idstein, the construction of which was commenced in 1646. The subjects and the use of Baroque optical illusionism in the paintings in the center of the ceiling are intended to make the viewer look up, from altar to the back: The Transfiguration, the Elevation of the Holy Cross, The Resurrection, The Deposition, The Ascension and The Vision of St. John on Patmos.

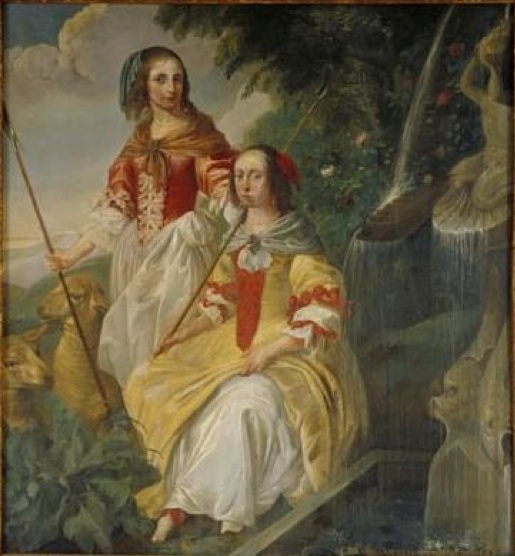
Double portrait of Odilia and Philippina Maria van Wassenaer as Shepherdesses

A number of Immenraet's compositions for the Unionskirche were based on well-known works by Rubens. For instance, The Wedding at Cana on the south wall is largely inspired by Rubens' painting The Feast of Herod (which is itself in the collection of the National Gallery of Scotland in Edinburgh). At the time, the series of works was regarded as a remarkably unique Baroque contribution to church decoration in Protestant Germany.
