= Polish Chamber Philharmonic Orchestra Sopot =

The Polish Chamber Philharmonic Orchestra Sopot (Polish: Polska Filharmonia Kameralna Sopot is a chamber orchestra based in Poland. It was founded in 1982 by Wojciech Rajski as the Polish Chamber Philharmonic, and since 1984 has also performed as a full orchestra and carries the name of Polish Chamber Orchestra Sopot. The orchestra's recordings can be heard on the EMI Classics, Dux Records, and Sony Classical labels, among others.
