= Gloria (Jenkins) =

Sacred choral composition by Karl Jenkins

- by Karl Jenkins
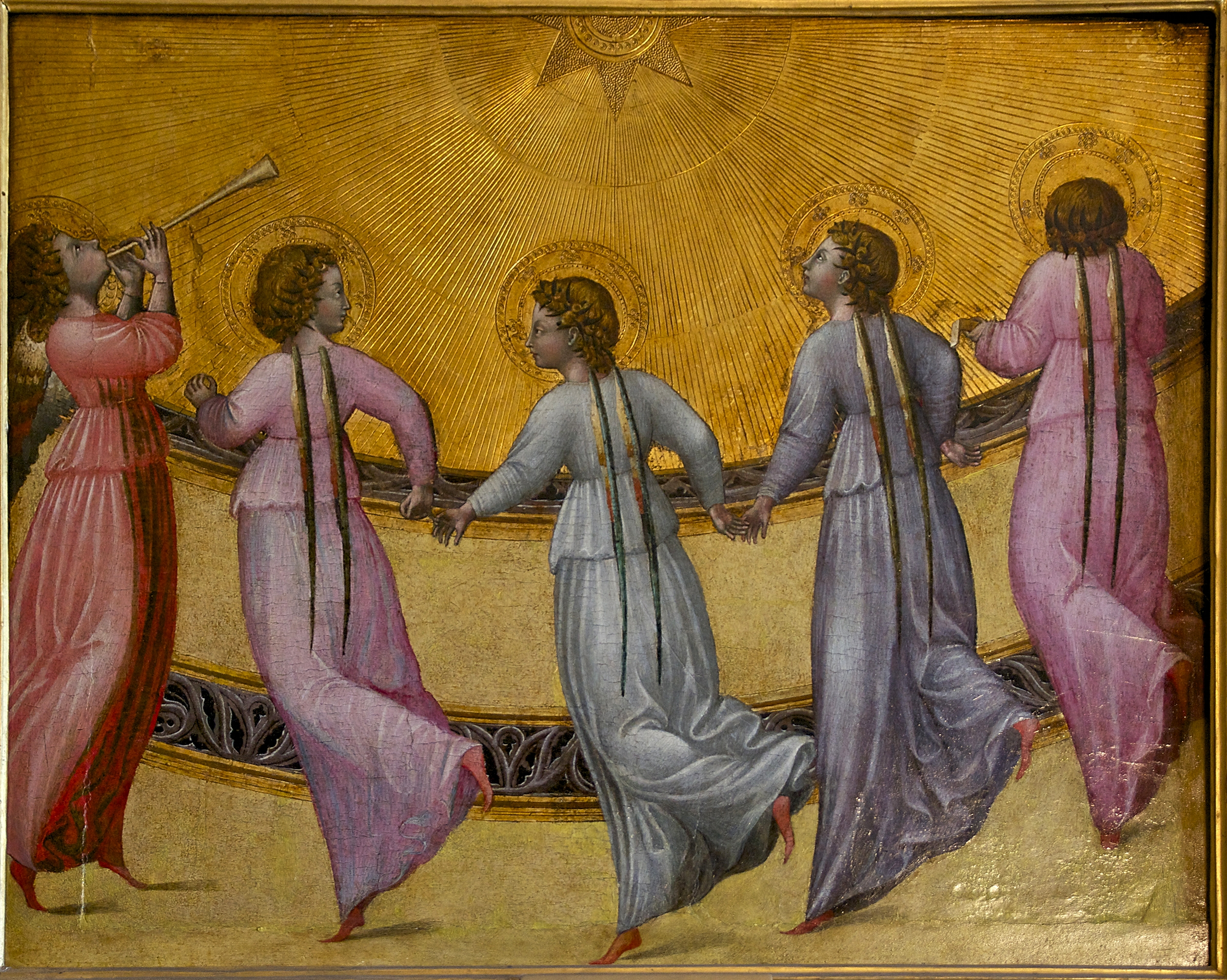
- Angels dancing by Giovanni di Paolo. Jenkins' text combines the Gloria, beginning with the Annunciation to the Shepherds, and Psalm 150 about singing and dancing for the Lord
- Text: Gloria; Psalm 150; A Song; Sacred scripture excerpts
- Language: Latin; Hebrew; English
- Composed: 2010
- Performed: 11 July 2010: London
- Published: 2010: London by Boosey & Hawkes
- Vocal: SATB choir; solo voice
- Instrumental: orchestra

Gloria is a sacred choral composition by Karl Jenkins, completed in 2010. It is an extended setting of the Gloria part of the mass in Latin, on the text of the Gloria in three movements, interpolated with two movements on other texts, Psalm 150 in Hebrew and a song derived from biblical verses in English. Spoken passages from sacred text from four religious traditions are part of the composition. It was published by Boosey & Hawkes in 2010. Gloria is often performed together with the composer's Te Deum.

== History ==
Jenkins composed the work in 2010 on a commission by Don Monro who founded the Concerts from Scratch and The Really Big Chorus. The piece is scored for a solo voice, a mixed choir and a large symphony orchestra with extensive percussion. The text is the Gloria of the mass, extended by other sung and spoken texts. The premiere on 11 July 2010 was performed at the Royal Albert Hall by The Really Big Chorus and the London Festival Orchestra, conducted by Brian Kay.

Gloria was published in 2010 by Boosey & Hawkes. It takes about 34 minutes to perform.

== Scoring and structure ==
Gloria is for a solo voice, a mixed choir and a large symphony orchestra with extensive, partly exotic percussion. The choir is four-part SATB, but both women's and men's voices are frequently divided in three parts. Any solo voice can perform in movement IV. The orchestra consists of two flutes (doubling piccolo), two oboes (optional), two clarinets in B♭ (second doubling bass clarinet), two bassoons (second optionally doubling contrabassoon), four horns in F, two or three trumpets in B♭, three 3 trombones, tuba (optional), timpani, percussion (three, 1: side drum, surdo, finger cymbals, cymbals, 2: triangle, cabasa, tambourine (or goblet drum etc.), hand drum (darbuca, congas, etc.), cymbals, suspended cymbal, 3: glockenspiel, xylophone, bass drum), and strings.

The text of the Gloria in structured in three movements (I, II, V), with two added movements (III and IV) on interspersed texts, the Psalm 150 (in Hebrew or Latin) and a song in English which is based on biblical verses. Between movements, sacred texts from different religious traditions (Hinduism, Buddhism, Taoism and Islam) are recited. The following table shows the movements and readings with their titles, incipit, translation, tempo marking and key, as provided in the vocal score. Time signatures are not listed as they change frequently.

| No. | Title | Incipit | Translation | Marking | Key |
|---|---|---|---|---|---|
| I | The Proclamation | Gloria in excelsis Deo | Glory to God in the highest | Moderato | C minor |
| II | The Prayer | Laudamus te | We praise you | Larghissimo | E♭ major |
| III | The Psalm: Tehillim | | O praise God in his holiness | Giubiloso | F |
| IV | The Song: I'll make music | | Lord and Master, I'll sing a song to you | Largo | D major |
| V | The Exsultation | Domine Deus | Lord God | Moderato | C minor |

== Music ==
Jenkins is known for "simple structures" which "are never sentimental", for "broad multicultural gestures", and "a particular take on the textures of older British band music". A review notes that he structured the Gloria in contrasting movements, some "big, brassy, quartal-sounding", others quiet "in which the choir circles around a core of three or four notes". The reviewer believes the insertions of short "readings of scripture from Hindu, Buddhist, Taoist, and Islamic traditions" and "'ethnic percussion' vaguely associated with these faiths" as suggesting "a sincere ecumenism on the composer's part". Movement III is reminiscent of Jenkins' popular Adiemus, "with its primeval-sounding harmonies, declamatory choral style and pounding drummed rhythms".

== Recording ==
Gloria is featured on a CD, together with Te Deum, sung by the National Youth Choir of Great Britain, with the London Symphony Orchestra, conducted by the composer.
