= Te Deum (Jenkins) =

- by Karl Jenkins
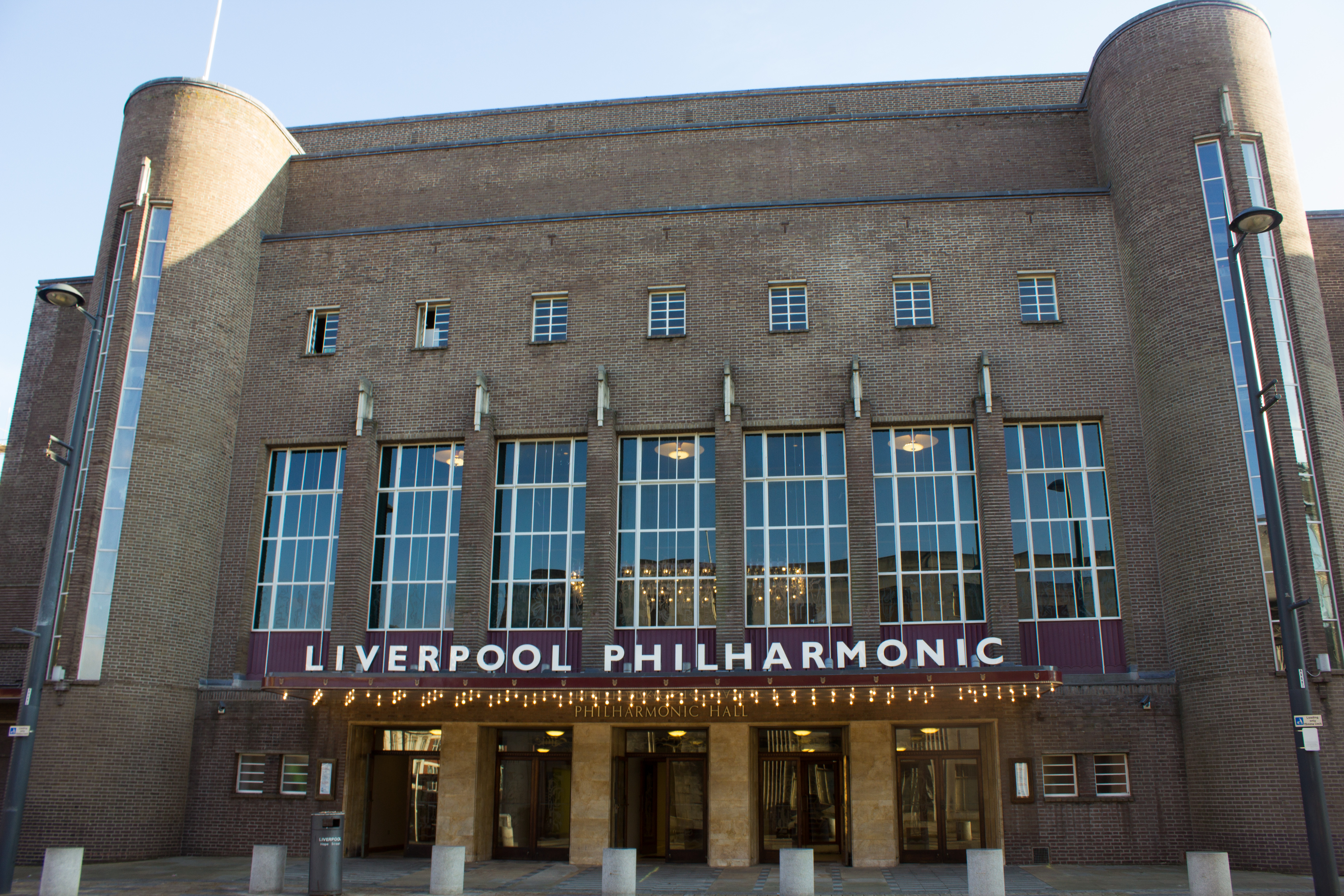
- Philharmonic Hall, Liverpool, location of the premiere
- Key: C major
- Occasion: Liverpool European Capital of Culture
- Text: Te Deum
- Language: Latin
- Composed: 2008
- Performed: 30 November 2008: Liverpool
- Published: 2009: London by Boosey & Hawkes
- Vocal: SATB choir
- Instrumental: 2 trumpets; strings; percussion

Te Deum is a sacred choral composition by Karl Jenkins, written in 2008. It is an extended setting of the Te Deum in Latin. Te Deum is often performed together with the composer's Gloria.

== History ==
Jenkins composed the work on a commission by the Liverpool Welsh Choral Union in 2008 when Liverpool was European Capital of Culture. The text chosen for the celebration is the Latin Te Deum, an early Christian hymn also known as the Ambrosian Hymn. The composer conducted the premiere on 30 November 2008, with the choir and the Royal Liverpool Philharmonic Orchestra, at the Philharmonic Hall. A review noted:

What he has created is a joyous, theatrical piece of music, from the opening Bernstein/Gershwinesque rhythmic fanfare, through a sweeping, lyrical vocal line to a march-like Sanctus with the massed voices emulating the beat of percussion's drum, and trumpets spiralling over the top in a Penny Lane-style voluntary.

Te Deum was published in 2009. It takes about 15 minutes to perform.

== Scoring and structure ==
The piece is scored for mixed choir SATB and an orchestra of strings, two trumpets and four percussionists, playing timpani, glockenspiel and xylophone, bass drum, cymbal and suspended cymbal, and side drum. The choir is four-part SATB, with the exception of one chord where both women and men are divided in three groups. Compared to other choral works by Jenkins such as the mass for peace The Armed Man, the demands on choir and orchestra size are moderate and make the work accessible for lay performers also.

The text is rendered in one movement but structured in sections of different character, with the first line of the text repeated in the end. The following table shows the sections with their incipit, the translation from the Book of Common Prayer, tempo marking, key and time signature, as provided in the vocal score.

| Incipit | Translation | Marking | Key | Time |
|---|---|---|---|---|
| Te Deum | We praise thee, O God | Allegro | C major | 3/4 |
| Te ergo quaesumus | We therefore pray Thee | Adagio | A minor | 3/4 |
| Aeterna fac cum sanctis tuis | Make them to be numbered with Thy Saints | Allegramente | F major | common time |
| Miserere nobis | O Lord, have mercy upon us | Largo | B minor | common time |
| Te Deum | | Vivace | C major | 3/4 |

== Recording ==
Te Deum is featured on a CD, together with Gloria, sung by the National Youth Choir of Great Britain, with the London Symphony Orchestra, conducted by the composer.
