= Stumm (organ builders) =

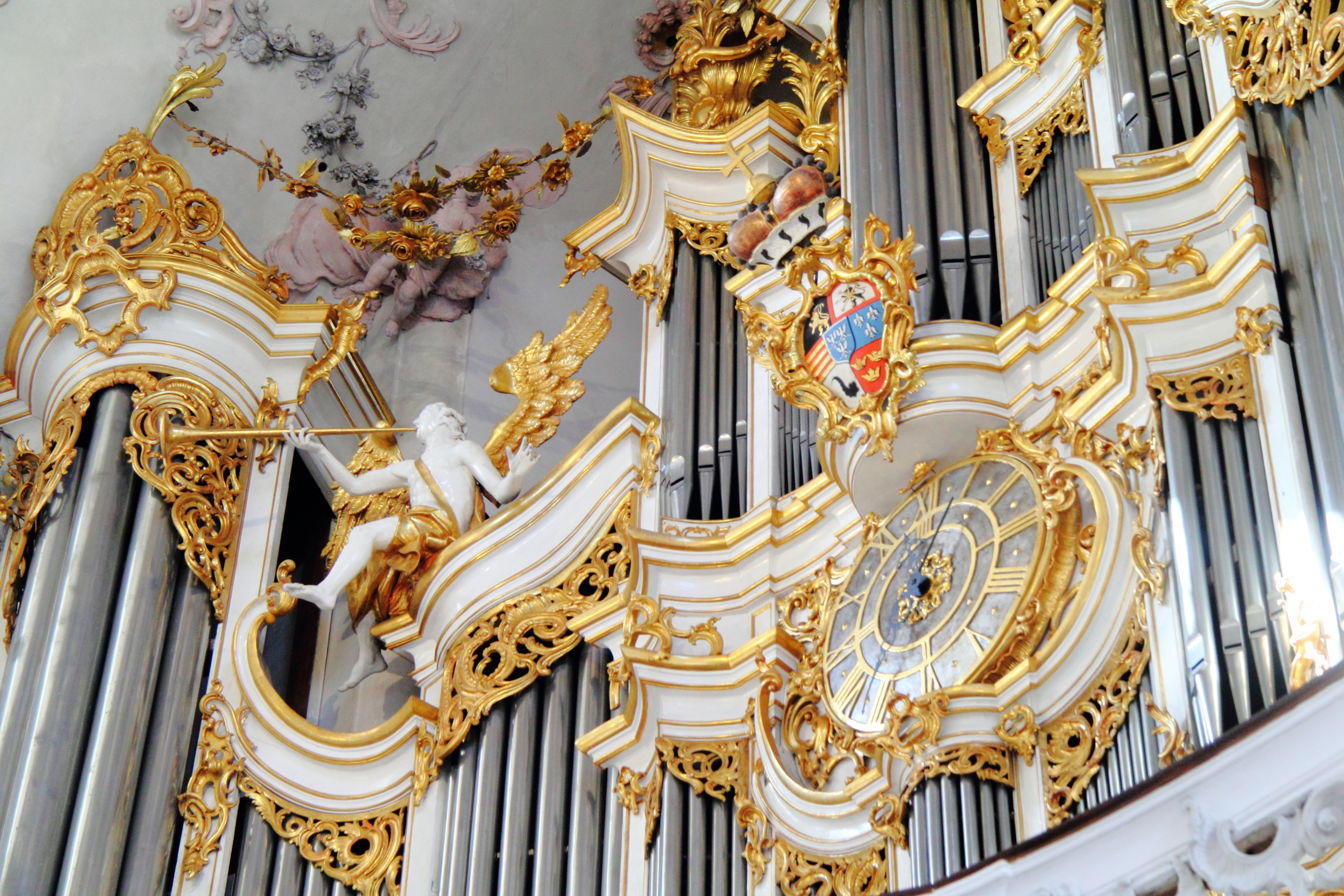
Stumm organ in Amorbach

The Stumm family is one of the most renowned organ-building dynasties in Germany. Founded by Johann Michael Stumm, with its main workshop in Sulzbach, Bavaria, the first organ was built in 1722 for a church in Münstermaifeld, Rhineland-Palatinate. The last organ was installed at Niederhosenbach in 1906, and the company ceased operations in 1920.

== History ==
The Stumm organ building company was founded by Johann Michael Stumm, a goldsmith, who became a distinguished organ builder. He and his descendants built approximately 400 organs over six generations, of which about half are still largely intact.

The first Stumm organ was built in 1722 and is situated in Münstermaifeld, Rhineland-Palatinate. The workshop of the Stumm company was in Sulzbach, Bavaria. Organs for built for parish churches, abbeys, and royal seats of both Catholic and Protestant denominations.

The last organ built in Sulzbach was sent to Niederhosenbach in 1896. In 1906, Stumm's second workshop in Kirn closed, and the workshop in Sulzbach finally ceased operations in 1920.

== Organ designs ==
Johann Michael's organ building exhibited French influences in its disposition. Characteristic of this is the division into Hauptwerk (main organ) and Rückpositiv (back positive). The facade design is dominated by three round towers, a feature of Rhenish influence, while only the first new organs in Münstermaifeld and Rhaunen feature the typical Main-Franconian harp-shaped panels. The earlier organs had wedge-shaped bellows which were stacked vertically, but from around 1850, the organs increasingly featured box or cylindrical bellows.

The second generation designed increasingly expansive facades, reaching their zenith with organs in Amorbach, Saarbrücken, and Frankfurt, for example. They became known for their exceptional quality, and were compared to other renowned organ builders such as Silbermann and Arp Schnitger.
