= Cantiones sacrae (Schütz) =

Collection of sacred music by Schütz

- by Heinrich Schütz
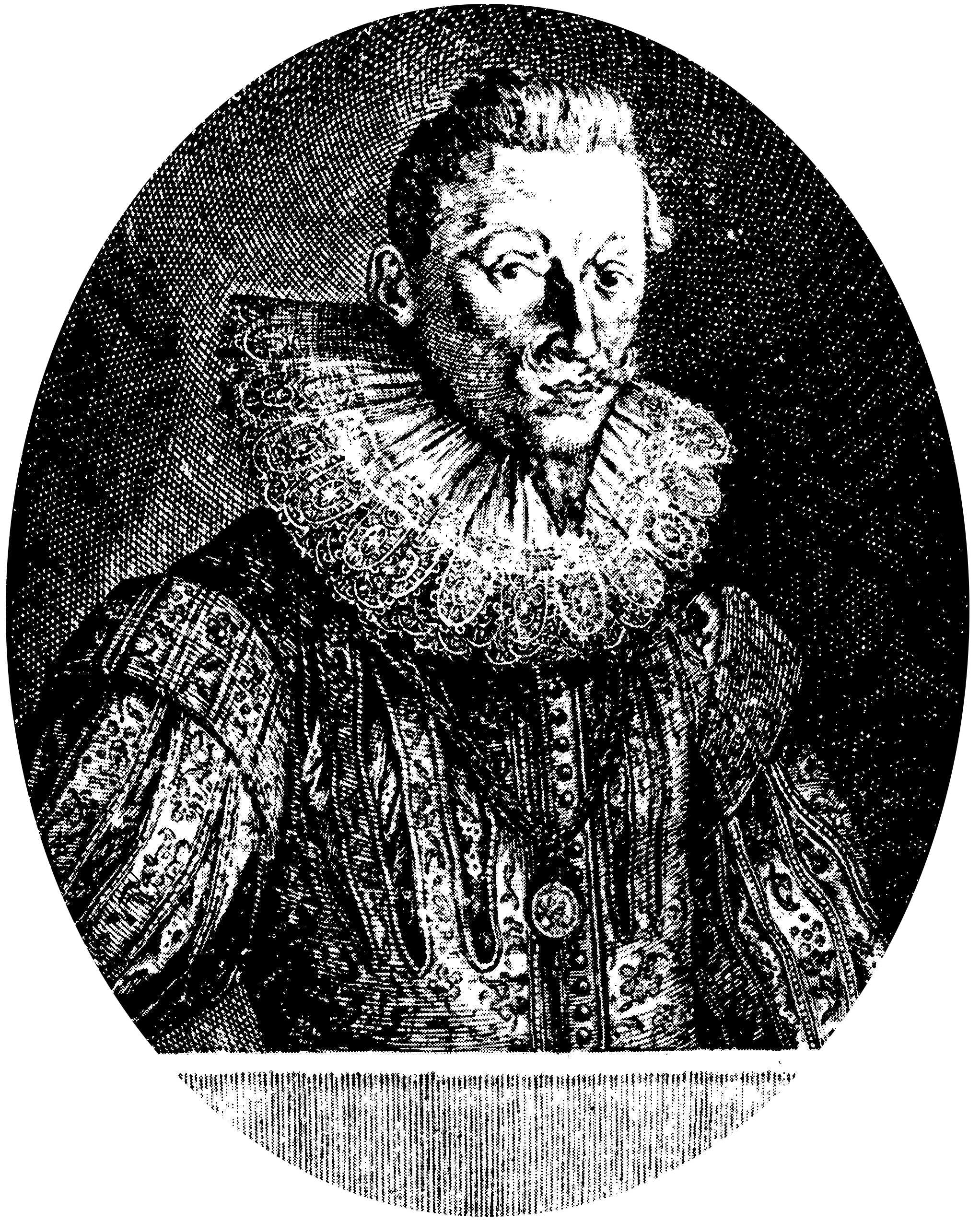
- The composer of the collection in 1627
- Catalogue: SWV 53 to 93
- Opus: 4
- Genre: Sacred vocal music
- Language: Latin
- Based on: Precationes by Andreas Musculus
- Dedication: Hans Ulrich von Eggenberg
- Published: 1625 in Freiberg
- Scoring: SATB voices; basso continuo

Cantiones sacrae (literally: Sacred chants), Op. 4, is a collection of forty pieces of vocal sacred music on Latin texts, composed by Heinrich Schütz and first published in 1625. The pieces have individual numbers 53 to 93 in the Schütz-Werke-Verzeichnis (SWV), the catalogue of his works. The general title Cantiones sacrae was common at the time and was used by many composers, including Palestrina, Byrd and Tallis (1589 and 1591) and Hans Leo Hassler (1591).

== History ==
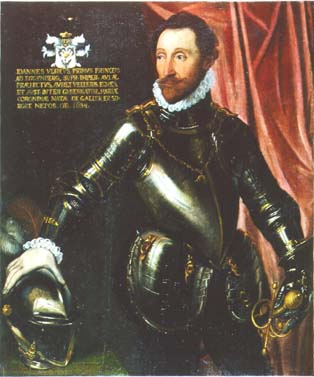
Prince Hans Ulrich von Eggenberg, to whom the composer dedicated the work, by Giovanni Pietro de Pomis, after 1625

Schütz composed the pieces during the first years of the Thirty Years' War, when he was in the service of the Protestant Elector of Saxony Johann Georg I, who tried to stay neutral. The texts are mostly taken from a prayerbook by Andreas Musculus, Precationes ex veteribus orthodoxis doctoribus, first published in 1553 and often reprinted. Subtitled "Ex Ecclesia Hymnis Et Canticis: Ex Psalmis Deniq[ue] Davidis Collectae" (Church hymns and chants from the collection of David's psalms), it is based on psalms, the Song of Songs, the Gospels, and passages by Bernard of Clairvaux, "significantly designed for intimate and private devotion". Some texts, then believed to be by Augustine such as meditations on the Passion, are now known to be by later writers such as Bernard and Anselm of Canterbury. Schütz set the texts for four voices (SATB) and basso continuo. He conceived the pieces for voices a cappella, but the publisher requested a basso part. The basso seguente, following the lowest voice, may have been added by a pupil.

Schütz published the collection as his Opus quartem (Fourth work) in Freiberg in 1625: forty pieces at age forty. In his foreword, he notes that the publisher "wrested" (extorsit) the accompaniment from him, while he regarded a bassus ad organum as "vain and clumsy" (vanum atq[ue] inconcinnum).

Schütz dedicated the work to the Catholic Prince Hans Ulrich von Eggenberg, an influential politician, whom he first met in 1617, when Eggenberg accompanied Emperor Ferdinand of Habsburg on a visit to Saxony. The composer has been described as "universal" (katholikos), and Cantiones sacrae as his "opus ecclesiasticum primum" (first sacred work), also his first publication on Latin texts. Musicologist Matteo Messori notes:

Schütz employed the international language that united European Christendom (as well as often being the language of communication between Lutherans of different nationalities) and hence potentially addressed Christians of every faith.

== Collection ==
The collection contains forty different individual motets and madrigals with numbers 53 to 93 in the SWV. Some works form groups of a similar topic of up to five pieces, marked pars (part). One movement, the Lord's Prayer, is repeated, being part of two groups. Musicologist Volckmar-Wasch identifies the 13th piece, Heu mihi Domine, as especially sad (tristis) and the 29th, Cantate Domino (Sing to the Lord), as happy (laetus).

The following table shows a sequence number, a number of groups, the SWV number, for groups the Latin term of the single part from the print, the first line of the Latin text replacing a title, a translation, an abbreviation of the text source within the prayer book and notes. The translations follow Emmanuel Music for SWV 53 to 81, otherwise the recording of the Heinrich Schütz Edition by Matteo Messori. For biblical quotation, the King James version is additionally supplied in the details about single pieces.

| No. | Group | SWV | Part | Title | English | Source (and notes) |
|---|---|---|---|---|---|---|
| 1 | 1 | SWV 53 | (Prima pars) | O bone, o dulcis, o benigne Jesu | O good, o sweet, o kind Jesus, | Bernard |
| 2 | 1 | SWV 54 | (Secunda pars) | Et ne despicias humiliter te petentem | O good, o sweet, o kind Jesus, | Bernard |
| 3 | 2 | SWV 55 | | Deus misereatur nostri, et benedicat nobis | God have mercy on us and bless us | |
| 4 | 3 | SWV 56 | (Prima pars) | Quid commisisti, o dulcissime puer? | What have You done, o sweetest boy? | Augustine |
| 5 | 3 | SWV 57 | (Secunda pars) | Ego sum tui plaga doloris | What have You done, o sweetest boy? | Augustine |
| 6 | 3 | SWV 58 | (Tertia pars) | Ego enim inique egi | What have You done, o sweetest boy? | Augustine |
| 7 | 3 | SWV 59 | (Quarta pars) | Quo, nate Dei, quo tua descendit humilitas | What have You done, o sweetest boy? | Augustine |
| 8 | 3 | SWV 60 | (Quinta et ultima pars) | Calicem salutaris accipiam | What have You done, o sweetest boy? | Augustine |
| 9 | 4 | SWV 61 | (Prima pars) | Verba mea auribus percipe, Domine | Give ear to my words, Lord | |
| 10 | 4 | SWV 62 | (Secunda pars) | Quoniam ad te clamabo, Domine | Give ear to my words, Lord | |
| 11 | 5 | SWV 63 | (Prima pars) | Ego dormio, et cor meum vigilat | I sleep, but my heart waketh | Song of Songs |
| 12 | 5 | SWV 64 | (Secunda pars) | Vulnerasti cor meum, filia charissima | I sleep, but my heart waketh | Song of Songs |
| 13 | 6 | SWV 65 | | Heu mihi, Domine, quia peccavi nimis | Woe is me, O Lord, for I have sinned so greatly | |
| 14 | 7 | SWV 66 | | In te, Domine, speravi | In You, Lord, I have trusted | |
| 15 | 8 | SWV 67 | | Dulcissime et benignissime Christe | Sweetest and kindest Christ | |
| 16 | 9 | SWV 68 | | Sicut Moses serpentem in deserto exaltavit | Just as Moses lifted up the serpent in the desert I John 3:14-15 | |
| 17 | 10 | SWV 69 | | Spes mea, Christe Deus, hominum tu dulcis amator | Christ God, my hope, you sweet lover of humanity, | |
| 18 | 11 | SWV 70 | | Turbabor, sed non perturbabor | I will tremble, but not be afraid | |
| 19 | 12 | SWV 71 | (Prima pars) | Ad Dominum cum tribularer clamavi | In my distress I cried unto the Lord | Psalm 120,1–3 |
| 20 | 12 | SWV 72 | (Secunda pars) | Quid detur tibi aut quid apponatur tibi | In my distress I cried unto the Lord | Psalm 120,1–3 |
| 21 | 13 | SWV 73 | (Prima pars) | Aspice pater piissimum filium | Consider, Father, your most pious son | Augustine |
| 22 | 13 | SWV 74 | (Secunda pars) | Nonne hic est, mi Domine, innocens ille | Consider, Father, your most pious son | Augustine |
| 23 | 13 | SWV 75 | (Tertia et ultima pars) | Reduc, Domine Deus meus, oculos majestatis | Consider, Father, your most pious son | Augustine |
| 24 | 14 | SWV 76 | (Prima pars) | Supereminet omnem scientiam, o bone Jesu | Far above all the knowledge of all humanity, o gentle Jesus | |
| 25 | 14 | SWV 77 | (Secunda pars) | Pro hoc magno mysterio pietatis | Far above all the knowledge of all humanity, o gentle Jesus | |
| 26 | 15 | SWV 78 | (Prima pars) | Domine, non est exaltatum cor meum | Lord, my heart is not haughty | Psalm 131 |
| 27 | 15 | SWV 79 | (Secunda pars) | Si non humiliter sentiebam | Lord, my heart is not haughty | Psalm 131 |
| 28 | 15 | SWV 80 | (Tertia et ultima pars) | Speret Israel in Domino | Lord, my heart is not haughty | Psalm 131 |
| 29 | 16 | SWV 81 | | Cantate Domino canticum novum | Sing a new song to the Lord | Psalm 149,1–3 |
| 30 | 17 | SWV 82 | | Inter brachia Salvatoris mei | In the arms of my Saviour | Augustine |
| 31 | 18 | SWV 83 | | Veni, rogo in cor meum | Come, I ask you, in my heart | |
| 32 | 19 | SWV 84 | | Ecce advocatus meus apud te, Deum patrem | | |
| 33 | 20 | SWV 85 | (Prima pars:) | Domine, ne in furore tuo arguas me | O Lord, rebuke me not in thine anger | Psalm 6 |
| 34 | 20 | SWV 86 | (Secunda pars) | Quoniam non est in morte qui memor sit tui | O Lord, rebuke me not in thine anger | Psalm 6 |
| 35 | 20 | SWV 87 | (Tertia et ultima pars) | Discedite a me omnes qui operamini | O Lord, rebuke me not in thine anger | Psalm 6 |
| 36 | 21 | SWV 88 | (Prima pars) | Oculi omnium in te sperant, Domine | The eyes of all look toward thee, O Lord | Psalm 145:15–16 |
| 37 | 21 | SWV 89 | (Secunda pars) | Pater noster, qui es in coelis | Our father ... | Lord's Prayer |
| 38 | 21 | SWV 90 | (Tertia et ultima pars) | Domine Deus, pater coelestis, benedic nobis | God, father in heaven, bless us | |
| 39 | 22 | SWV 91 | (Prima pars) | Confitemini Domino, quoniam ipse bonus | O give thanks unto the Lord, for he is good | Psalms 105:1 |
| 37 | 22 | SWV 92 | (Secunda pars) | Pater noster: Repetatur ut supra | Our father ... | Lord's Prayer (same as SWV 89) |
| 40 | 22 | SWV 93 | (Tertia et ultima pars) | Gratias agimus tibi, Domine Deus Pater | We thank you, Lord God Father | |

== Composition ==
The major influence for the compositions was the polyphony of Palestrina's madrigals. Matteo Messori, who has been conducting recordings of the complete works by Schütz, regards the counterpoint of Cantiones as "superlative and unmatched among the sacred vocal works of the 17th century", comparable only to the madrigals alla maniera italiana (in the Italian manner) from Fontana d'Israel, Israelis Brünnlein, published in 1623 by the composer's friend and Thomaskantor Johann Hermann Schein. Musicologist Stephen Rose terms the Cantiones "the composer's "most impassioned pieces" and notes: "They set first-person devotional texts to avant-garde madrigalism", evoking the crucifixion by extreme harmonies and "joy in Christ by dance rhythms".

=== SWV 53–54 ===
The collection opens with two movements addressing Jesus, based on an invocation of his name by Bernhard of Clairvoux, O bone, o dulcis, o benigne Jesu (O good, o sweet, o benign Jesus), followed by Et ne despicias humiliter te petentem (And do not despise the one asking in humility).

=== SWV 56–60 ===
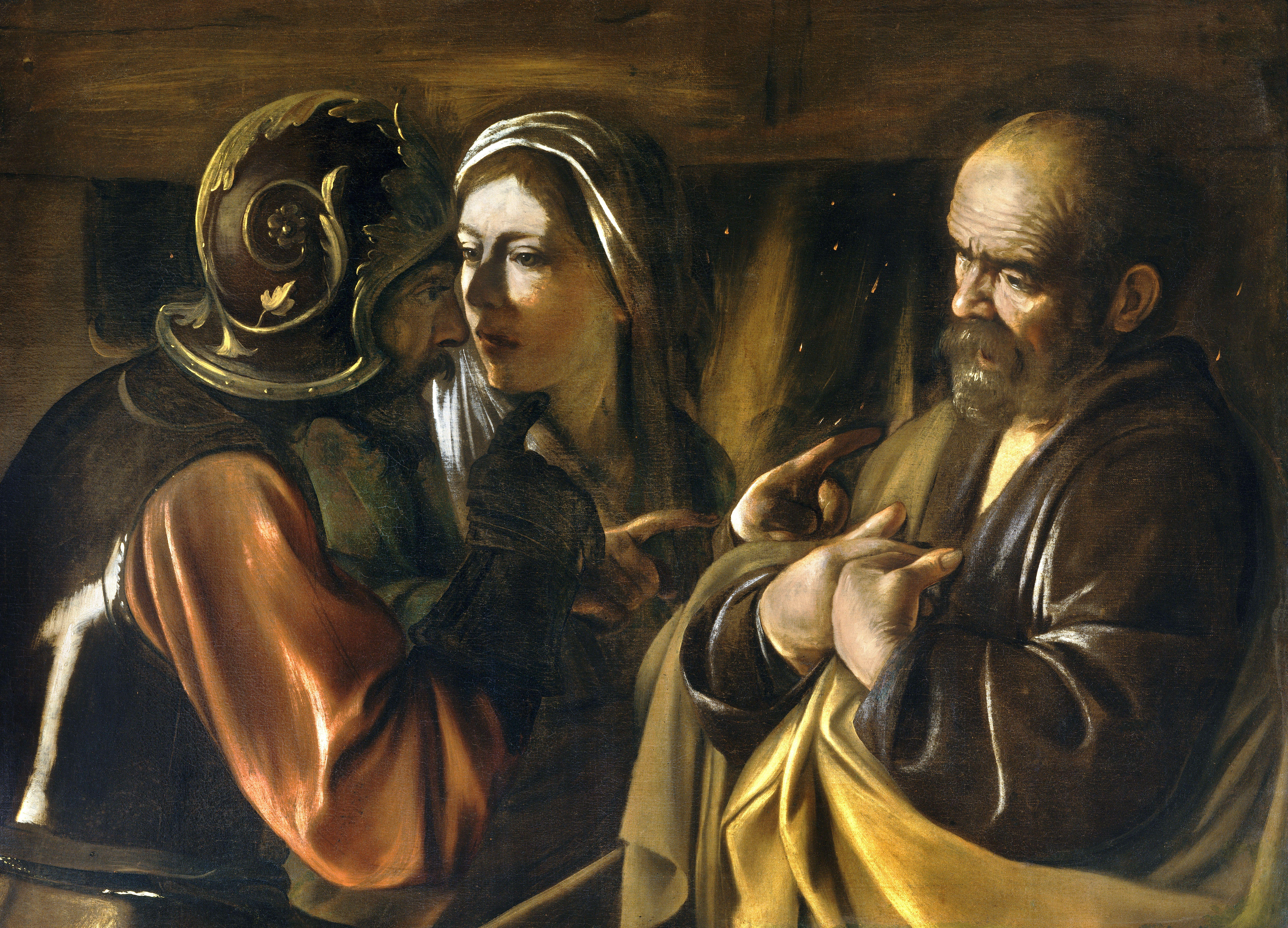
The Denial of Peter (1610) by Caravaggio, Metropolitan Museum of Art

SWV 56–60 form a group of five Passion motets, set the text of Psalm 115 augmented by Augustine and later authors. The first movement is Quid commisisti, o dulcissime puer? (What have You done, o sweetest boy?) Craig Smith notes: "In richness of harmony, intensity of expression, and most importantly, the exploration of the vague, the ambiguous, and the contradictory, they are without equal," and compares them to the drama, light and shade in paintings by Caravaggio.

=== SWV 63–64 ===
Ego dormio, et cor meum vigilat (I sleep, but my heart waketh, Song of Solomon 5:2) and Vulnerasti cor meum, filia charissima (Thou hast ravished my heart ..., Song of Solomon 4:9) are based on verses from the Song of Songs. The biblical text was slightly changed, replacing "soror mea sponsa" (my sister, my spouse) by "filia charissima" (most beloved daughter), which may reflect the composer's loss of his daughter.

=== SWV 73–75 ===
A sequence of three more Passion motets is positioned in the middle of the collection, beginning with Aspice pater piissimum filium (Consider, Father, your most pious son).

=== SWV 78–80 ===
Schütz composed the three verses of Psalm 131, Domine, non est exaltatum cor meum (Lord, my heart is not haughty, Psalms 131) in a group of three movements.

=== SWV 81 ===
Cantate Domino canticum novum (Sing to the Lord a new song, (Psalms 149:1-3) is a madrigal setting of the three verses bidding everybody who hears them to sing and play for the Lord. Musicologist Volckmar-Wasch describes the mood as happy (laetus).

=== SWV 85 ===
The penitential Psalm 6, Domine, ne in furore tuo arguas me (O Lord, rebuke me not in thine anger, Psalms 6) is set in one movement.

== Reception ==
After the composer's death, the collection was not as popular as his Geistliche Chormusik (Sacred choral music) for which he became known in the 20th century. Musicologists began earlier than the public to be interested in the works and their advanced composition. Carl von Winterfeldt analysed them in his monography of Giovanni Gabrieli, illustrated by musical examples. A thesis by Anna Amalie Abert was published in 1935, another by Heide Volckmar-Waschk in 2001, dedicated to the work's history, texts and analysis.

== Publication and recordings ==
After the first publication, the Cantiones appeared as part of a complete edition of the composer's works by Breitkopf & Härtel, begun by Philipp Spitta, who published a first volume in 1885, and completed by Arnold Schering and Heinrich Spitta in 1927. This edition was faithful to keys and clefs, a problem for modern performers. In 1960, Gottfried Grote published the collection in the Neue Ausgabe, transposing and with modern meter signs. A critical edition was published in 2004 by Bärenreiter, edited by Heide Volckmar-Waschk, who uses modern clefs, but shows the original clefs and retains the keys and note values.

The Cantiones sacrae are part of the complete edition of the composer's works by Carus-Verlag, begun in 1992 in continuation of the Stuttgart Schütz Edition and planned to be completed by 2017. The edition uses the Heinrich-Schütz-Archiv of the Hochschule für Musik Dresden. They were recorded, as part of the complete recordings of works by Schütz, by the Dresdner Kammerchor and organist Ludger Rémy, conducted by Hans-Christoph Rademann.
