= Weib, was weinest du =

Sacred (pre-1625) choral by Heinrich Schütz

- by Heinrich Schütz
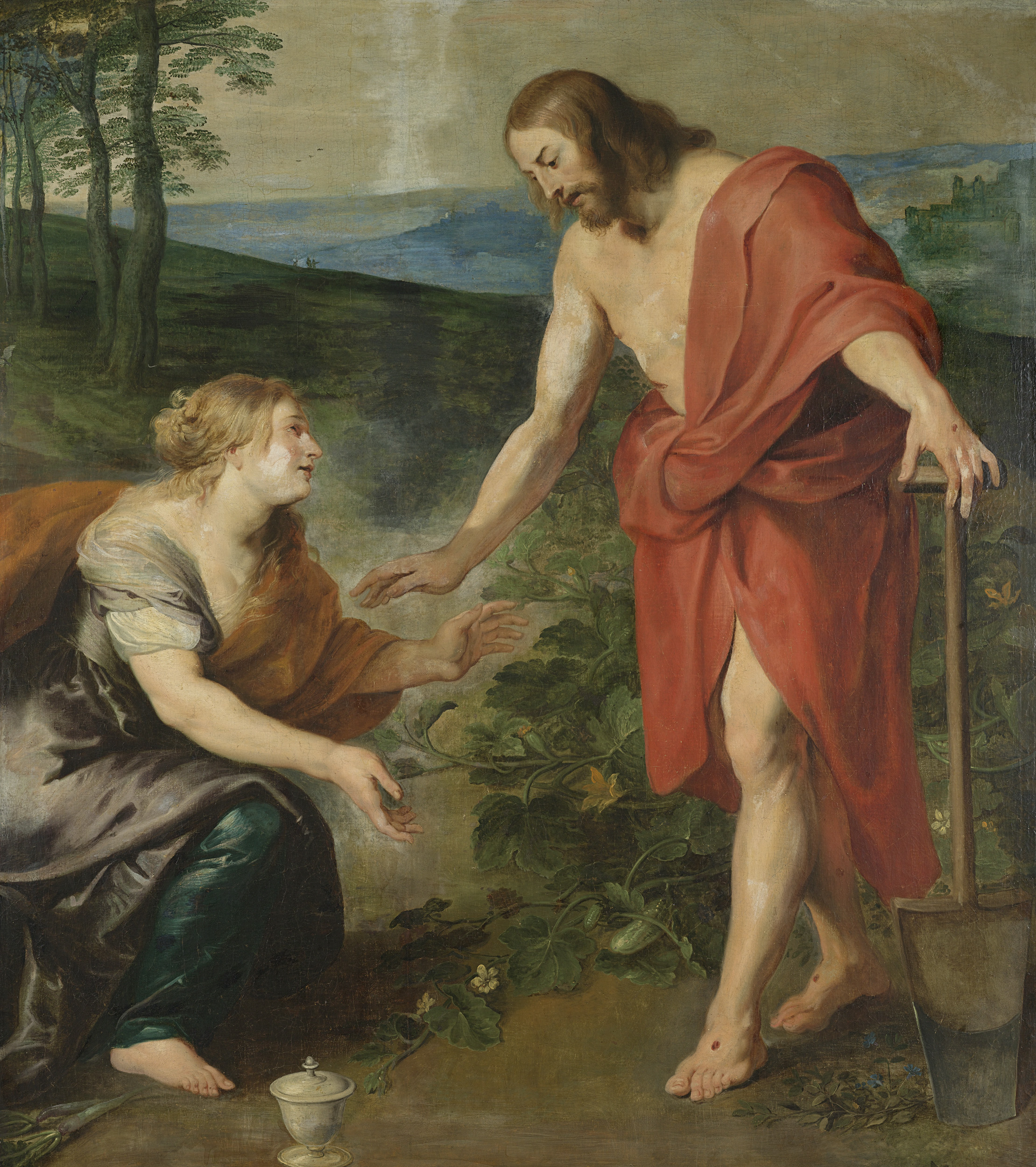
- Mary Magdalene recognizing Jesus, workshop of Peter Paul Rubens
- Catalogue: SWV 443
- Genre: Sacred vocal music
- Text: John 20:13–17; hymn by Martin Luther
- Language: German
- Vocal: SSAT or SSTB choir
- Instrumental: continuo

Weib, was weinest du (Dialogo per la Pascua) (Woman, why are you crying, Easter dialogue), SWV 443, is a sacred choral work by Heinrich Schütz. It was composed not later than 1625 and is scored for four voices and basso continuo.

The text is a dialogue based on the episode, narrated in the Gospel of John, of Jesus appearing to Mary Magdalene (John 20:13–17). It is concluded by Martin Luther's Eastern hymn "Christ ist erstanden von dem Tod".

Musical means were taken from the composer's 1623 Historia of the Resurrection, which includes the same Gospel text. A review of a recording notes: "A setting of Mary Magdalene's recognition of the risen Jesus, it is notable in its expressive intensity and in its retention of motives and harmonic gestures from the earlier "Resurrection History."

In 1922 the piece was included in the first festival of the Heinrich-Schütz-Gesellschaft in Dresden, together with the Christmas Story and other selected works.

A manuscript is kept in the library of the University of Kassel. Its date is assumed to be between 1627 and 1632. It was part of an exhibition in 2010, celebrating the 425th anniversary of the composer's birth by showing manuscripts, librettos, first prints, documents and instruments.

== Publication and recordings ==
Weib, was weinest du was published in 1968 by Bärenreiter as part of the Neue Schütz-Ausgabe. The piece is part of the complete edition of the composer's works by Carus-Verlag, begun in 1992 as the Stuttgart Schütz Edition and planned to be completed by 2017. The edition uses the Heinrich-Schütz-Archiv of the Hochschule für Musik Dresden.
