= Symphoniae sacrae I =

1629 Heinrich Schütz musical composition

- Sacred vocal music by Heinrich Schütz
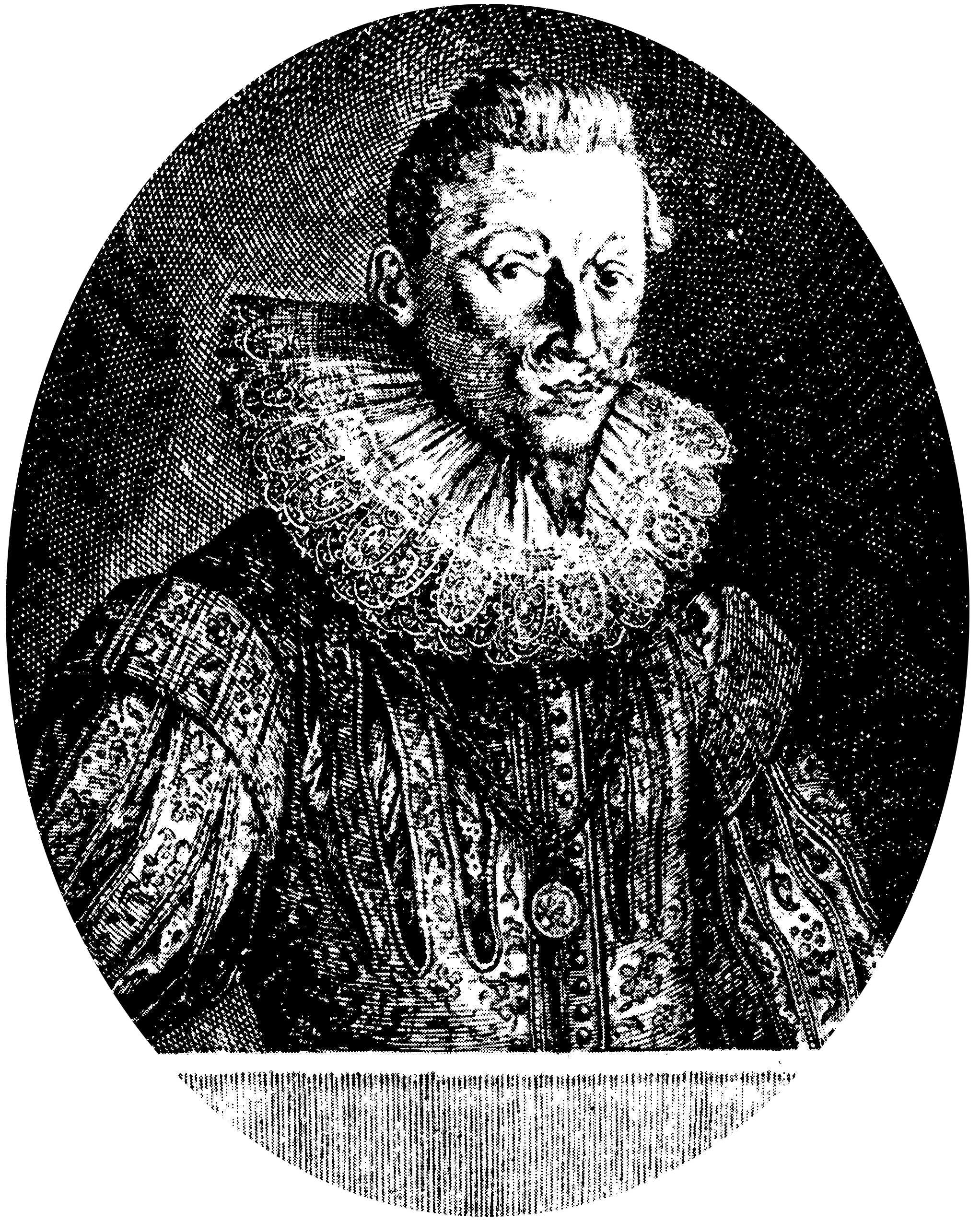
- The composer of the collection in 1627
- Catalogue: SWV 257 to 276
- Opus: 6
- Text: Psalms and other biblical texts
- Language: Latin
- Dedication: Johann Georg II
- Published: 1629
- Scoring: SATB voices; instruments; basso continuo

Symphoniae sacrae I (literally: Sacred Symphonies, Book One) is a collection of different pieces of vocal sacred music on Latin texts, composed by Heinrich Schütz, published in 1629. He set mostly psalms and excerpts from the Song of Solomon for one to three voices, with various instruments and continuo. Its twenty pieces were assigned 257 to 276 in the Schütz-Werke-Verzeichnis (SWV), the catalogue of his works. Two later volumes came, but with German texts: Symphoniae sacrae II in 1647 and Symphoniae sacrae III in 1650.

== History ==
Schütz composed the first collection during his second study trip to Venice. During his first visit he studied the Venetian polychoral style with Giovanni Gabrieli. Returning in 1628 after Gabrieli's death, he studied with his successor at St Mark's Basilica, Claudio Monteverdi. Schütz was in the service of the Protestant Elector of Saxony Johann Georg I, and dedicated the collection to the Elector's son, crown prince Johann Georg II, then 16 years old. The texts are mostly taken from the Bible, most of them setting excerpts from psalms and from the Song of Solomon. Schütz set the texts as concertos for various combinations of one to three voices, instruments (both strings and winds) and basso continuo.

Schütz published the collection in 1629 in Venice as his Symphoniae sacrae. Opus Sextum. Opus Ecclesiasticum Secundum., his sixth work, and his second work in Latin. In his Latin foreword, he mentions Gabrieli, but not Monteverdi. The composer has been described as "universal" (katholikos), and after his Cantiones sacrae published a second work in Latin. The musicologist Matteo Messori notes:

Schütz employed the international language that united European Christendom (as well as often being the language of communication between Lutherans of different nationalities) and hence potentially addressed Christians of every faith.

Schütz later composed two more collections titled Symphoniae sacrae as Op. 10 and Op. 12. The general title was common at the time and was used by many composers, including his teacher Giovanni Gabrieli who used it for his larger concertos.

== Collection ==
The collection contains twenty different individual concertos with numbers 257 to 276 in the SWV. The following table shows a sequence number, the SWV number, the first line of the Latin text replacing a title, a translation, an abbreviation of the text source and notes. The translations follow Emmanuel Music for SWV 257, 263, 264, a study bible for the Song of Solomon, otherwise the King James version. Links to that bible version are provided in the next column. Note that psalm numbering and verse numbering within a psalm is different in different editions. The last column provides a link to the details about the piece from the Schütz Association, which contains the text, a translation to German, the volume in the Neue Schütz-Ausgabe, biblical source(s), and further links to the collection's history, original foreword, analysis, dedication, original cover, reception and sources.

No.	SWV	Title	English	Source	Details
1	257	Paratum cor meum Deus	My heart is ready, O God	Psalms 108:1–3	257
2	258	Exultavit cor meum in Domino	My heart rejoiceth in the Lord	1 Samuel 2:1–2	258
3	259	In te Domine speravi	In thee, O Lord, have I hoped	Psalms 30:1–2,1	259
4	260	Cantabo domino in vita mea	I will sing unto the Lord as long as I live	Psalms 104:33	260
5	261	Venite ad me omnes qui laboratis	Come unto me, all ye that labour	Matthew 11:28–30	261
6	262	Jubilate Deo omnis terra	Make a joyful noise unto the Lord	Psalms 100	262
7	263	Anima mea liquefacta est	My soul melted when my beloved spoke	Song of Solomon 5:6; 2:14; 5:13; 5:8	263
8	264	Adjuro vos filiae Jerusalem	I adjure you, daughters of Jerusalem	Song of Solomon 5:6; 2:14; 5:13; 5:8	264
9	265	O quam tu pulchra es amica mea	How beautiful you are, my love	Song of Solomon 4:1-5,8	265
10	266	Veni de Libano veni amica mea	Advance from Lebanon, my spouse	Song of Solomon 4:1-5,8	266
11	267	Benedicam Dominum in omni tempore	I will bless the Lord at all times	Psalms 34:1–2	267
12	268	Exquisivi Dominum et exaudivit me	I sought the Lord, and he heard me	Psalms 34:4–6	268
13	269	Fili mi Absalon	My son, Absalom	2 Samuel 18:32	269
14	270	Attendite popule meus	Give ear, O my people	Psalms 78:1–3	270
15	271	Domine labia mea aperies	O Lord, open thou my lips	Psalms 51:15	271
16	272	In lectulo per noctes	On my bed, throughout the night	Song of Solomon 3:1-2,4	272
17	273	Invenerunt me costudes civitatis	The watchers who guard the city found me	Song of Solomon 3:1-2,4	273
18	274	Veni dilecte mi in hortum meum	May my beloved enter into his garden	Song of Solomon 5:1	274
19	275	Buccinate in neomenia tuba	Blow the trumpet when the moon is new	Psalms 81:3,1; 98:6	275
20	276	Jubilate Deo in chordis	Let us rejoice in God with strings and organ	Psalms 150:4; Psalms 98:4	276

== Music ==
Schütz followed Monteverdi's seconda pratica in setting the biblical texts not in the older polyphonic style, but in dramatic declamation close to the opera of the period. This approach to word setting mirrors the ideas of the Reformation in its focus on the words of scripture. The settings have been described as "eloquent, sensitive, and often sensuous".

== Recordings ==
The Symphoniae sacrae are part of the complete edition of the composer's works by Carus-Verlag, begun in 1992 in continuation of the Stuttgart Schütz Edition. The edition uses the Heinrich-Schütz-Archiv of the Hochschule für Musik Dresden. They were recorded in 2003 with the Cappella Augustana including singers Anna Mikołajczyk, Marzena Lubaszka, Piotr Lykowski, Krzysztof Szmyt, Robert Pozarski, Harry van der Kamp, Bogdan Makal, Walter Testolin and Gian Paolo Dal Dosso, conducted by organist Matteo Messori. They were recorded in 2016, as part of the complete recordings of works by Schütz, by the Dresdner Kammerchor and organist Ludger Rémy, conducted by Hans-Christoph Rademann, with soloists Dorothee Mields, Isabel Jantschek, David Erler, Georg Poplutz, Tobias Mäthger and Felix Schwandte.
