= Messori =

Messori is an Italian surname. Notable people with the surname include:

- Filippo Messori (born 1973), Italian tennis player
- Matteo Messori (born 1976), Italian keyboard player, conductor, musicologist and teacher
- Vittorio Messori (1941–2026), Italian journalist and Christian writer
