= Neue Schütz-Ausgabe =

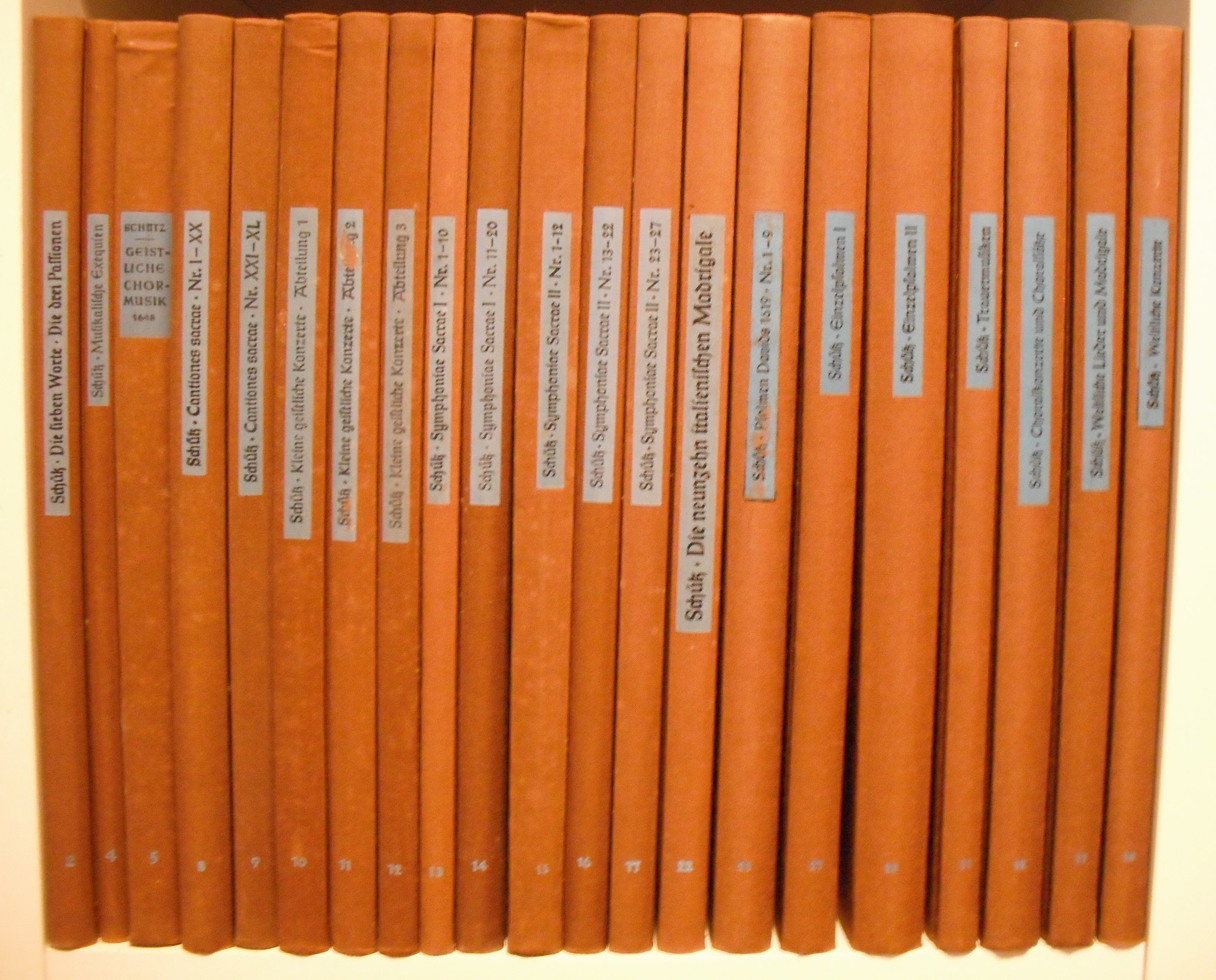
Volumes of the edition

Neue Schütz-Ausgabe (new Schütz edition) is a new critical edition of the complete works by composer Heinrich Schütz (full title in German: Heinrich Schütz: Neue Ausgabe sämtlicher Werke). It is published by Bärenreiter-Verlag on a commission by the international Heinrich-Schütz-Gesellschaft.

== Content ==
When completed, the edition will comprise the following volumes:

- Historien und Passionen (3 vol)
- Musikalische Exequien
- Geistliche Chormusik (2 vol)
- Becker Psalter (2 vol)
- Zwölf Geistliche Gesänge 1657
- Cantiones sacrae (2 vol)
- Kleine geistliche Konzerte (3 vol)
- Symphoniae sacrae I–III (9 vol)
- Italienische Madrigale
- Psalmen Davids (4 vol)
- Single psalms (2 vol)
- Hochzeitskonzerte, dialogues, funeral music (3 vol)
- Choralkonzerte und Choralsätze
- Single works
- Größere Kirchenkonzerte (2 vol)
- Secular songs and madrigals (2 vol)
- Schwanengesang
- Supplement (5 vol)
