= Magnificat (Schütz) =

Baroque hymn with biblical lyrics/musical composition by Heinrich Schütz

- by Heinrich Schütz
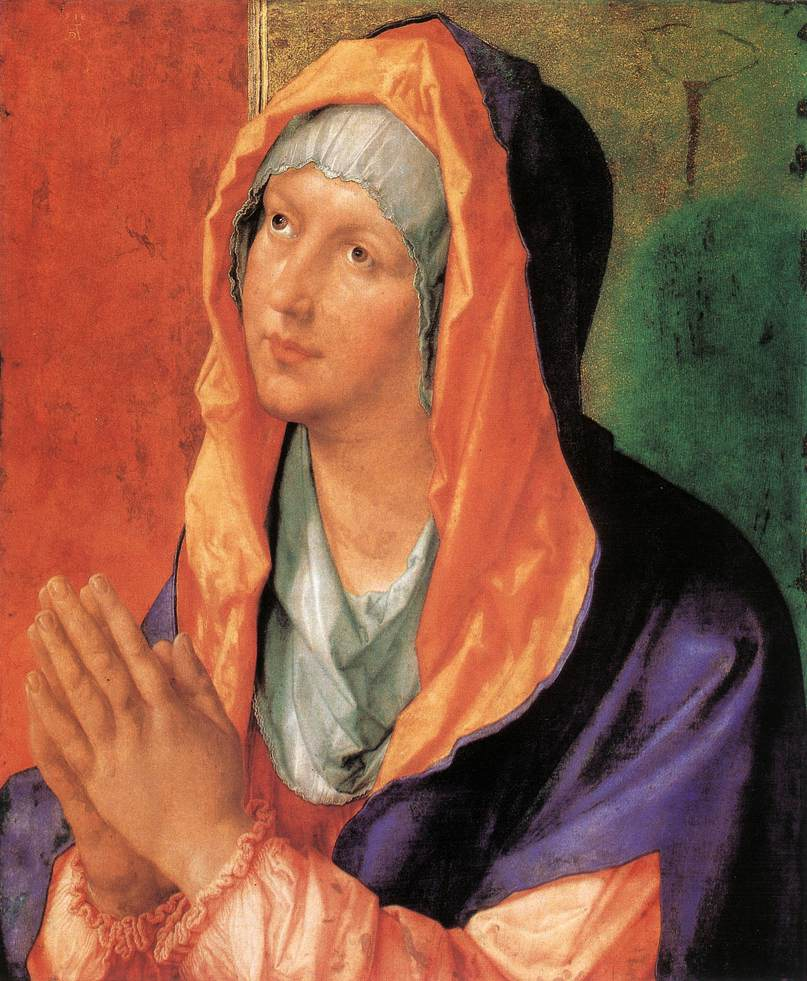
- Betende Maria (Praying Mary), by Albrecht Dürer (1518)
- Genre: Sacred vocal music
- Text: Magnificat
- Language: Latin; German
- Composed: 1628 – 1671
- SWV 344; SWV 426; SWV 468 (in Latin); SWV 494

Heinrich Schütz composed four extant settings of the Magnificat or Song of Mary, one of the three New Testament canticles. He set one in Latin and three in German. In the Schütz-Werke-Verzeichnis (SWV), the compositions have the numbers 344, 426, 468 (in Latin) and 494. The settings on the German text are all part of larger groups of works. They are settings of Martin Luther's German Magnificat, "Meine Seele erhebt den Herren" (My soul magnifies the Lord). Schütz wrote the compositions for different forces and occasions.

== Magnificat ==
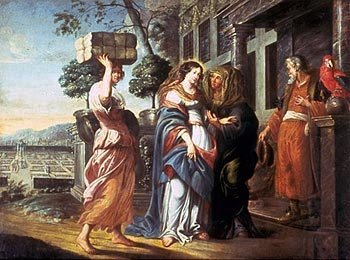
Heimsuchung (Visitation), Unionskirche, Idstein

The Magnificat or Song of Mary is one of the three New Testament canticles, the others being Nunc dimittis and Benedictus. Mary sings the song on the occasion of her visit to Elizabeth, as narrated in the Gospel of Luke (Luke 1:39–56). Magnificat, a regular part in Catholic vesper services, was also used in the Lutheran church, in vespers and for Marian feasts.

Schütz set the Magnificat text once in Latin and five times in German, Meine Seele erhebt den Herren (My soul magnifies the Lord), also called German Magnificat. Schütz composed them at different times for different forces, occasions and purpose. Some belong in the context of a larger collection. Two of the settings in German are lost.

== Table of Magnificat compositions by Schütz ==
The sortable list below shows the year of composition, the language, context, publication date, scoring, key, duration in minutes, and access to a score. The vocal parts are abbreviated, S for soprano, A for alto, T for tenor and B for bass, in choir SATB. Schütz used Baroque instruments and did not always specify them specifically. As Johan van Vee points out, "there is general agreement that in those of his works which are strongly rooted in the tradition of counterpoint instruments can or should be used to support the voices".

SWV	Year	Language	In	Published	Vocal	Instruments	Key	Duration	Score
344	1643	German	Symphoniae sacrae II	1647	S	2 instruments Bc			SWV 341–367
426	1625?	German	Zwölf geistliche Gesänge	1657	SATB	Bc			SWV 420–431
468	1665	Latin			3 choirs SATB	3Tb 2Vl Bc 8 instruments, Cb Org	G	13	SWV 468
494	1669	German	Swan Song	1671	2 choirs SATB	8 instruments, Cb Org	A minor	8	SWV 494

== SWV 344 ==
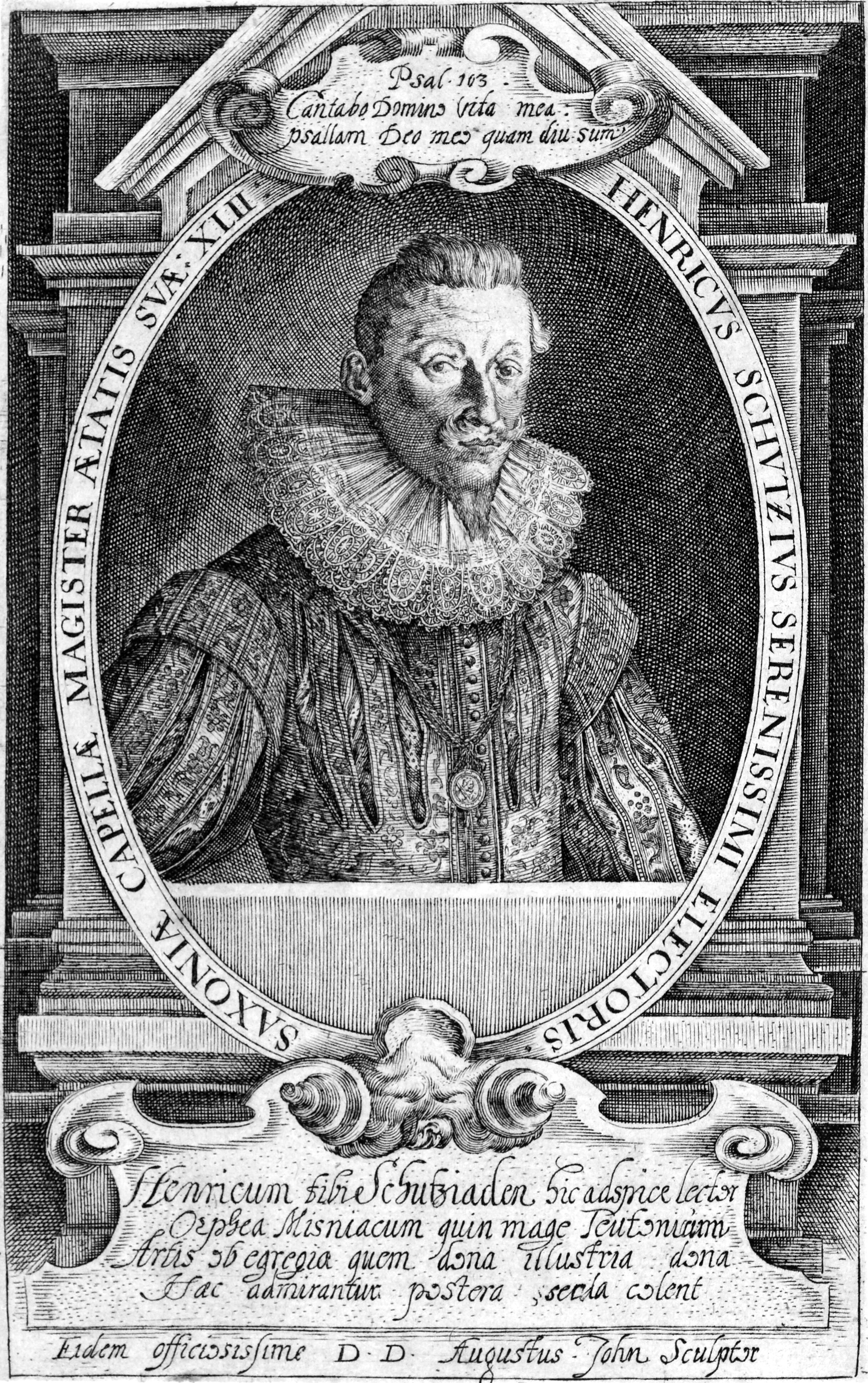
Schütz in 1627

Schütz composed Meine Seele erhebt den Herren, SWV 344, in 1643 as part of Symphoniae sacrae II for soprano, two unspecified instruments and basso continuo.

== SWV 426 ==
Schütz composed Meine Seele erhebt den Herren, SWV 426 for four-part choir and basso continuo. It was published in 1657 by Christoph Kittel as part of the collection Zwölf geistliche Gesänge (Twelve sacred songs), intended for "Gottes Ehren und Christlichen nützlichen Gebrauch / in Kirchen und Schulen" (God's honours and Christian use in churches and schools).

== SWV 468 ==
Schütz composed the sacred concerto Magnificat anima mea, SWV 468 (also called the Uppsala Magnificat) in 1665 for double SATB choir, SATB soloists (Favoritchor), three trombones, two violins, organ, and basso continuo. The double SATB choir can be rendered by voices and instruments, or by instruments alone. Craig Smith describes the work's "dazzling color".

== SWV 494 ==
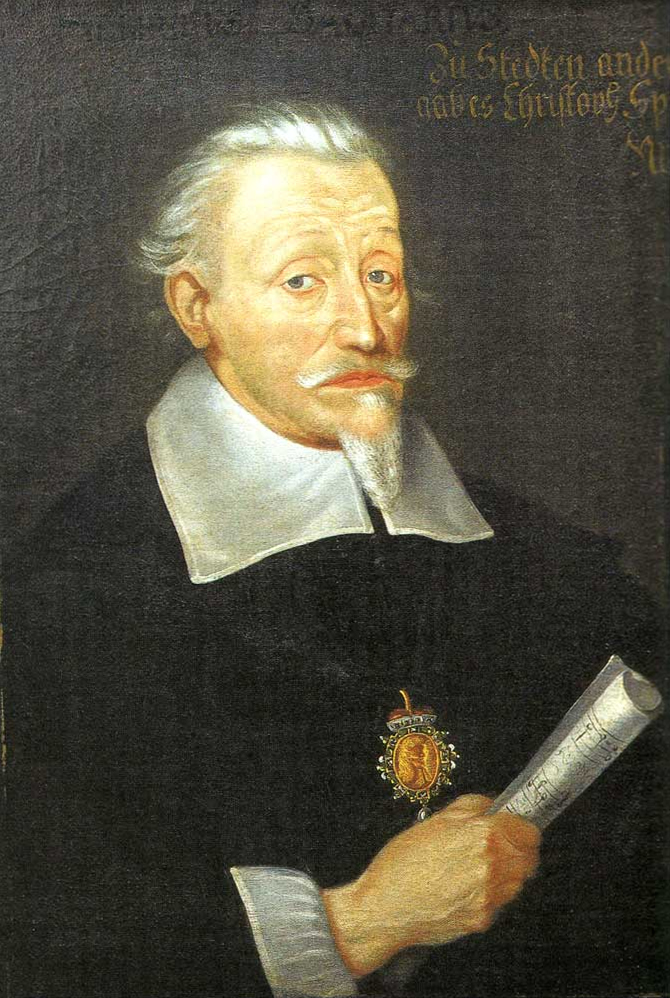
Schütz, c. 1650–60, by Christoph Spetner

Schütz composed Meine Seele erhebt den Herren, SWV 494, in 1669 for two four-part choirs, instruments and basso continuo. It was published in the composer's last collection Des Königs und Propheten Davids 119. Psalm in 11 Stücken (Opus ultimum) (The 119th psalm by king and prophet David in 11 pieces (last work)). This work, consisting of an elaborate setting in eleven movements of Psalm 119 combined with an earlier setting of Psalm 100 and the Magnificat, was intended by Schütz to be his final work and is therefore also called Schwanengesang (Swan Song). The original title reads "Königs und Propheten Davids Hundert und Neunzehender Psalm in Eilf Stükken nebenst dem Anhange des 100. Psalms: Jauchzet dem Herrn! und Eines deutschen Magnificats: Meine Seele erhöbt den Herrn". (King and prophet David's 119th psalm in eleven pieces with the appendix of the 100th psalm "Rejoice in the Lord!" and a German Magnificat).

Schütz composed the work in Weißenfels, where he had bought a house at Nicolaigasse 13 to spend his retirement. The house was reopened in 2012 as a memorial site for the composer. Schütz dedicated the work to Johann Georg II of Saxony, but it was possibly not performed in his presence. Contemporaries knew the work already as Schwanengesang. Two of the eight vocal parts, soprano and tenor of choir II, are missing. The organ part was found in the mid 1970s and made an edition with a reconstruction of the two missing voices possible. In 1985, the 400th anniversary of the composer's birth, the work was performed again.

The setting is in one movement, alternating between duple meter and, more often, triple meter, frequently ending a phrase with hemiolas. It does not use the plainchant associated with the Magnificat. On phrases such as "lowliness of His handmaiden" or "cast down from their seats", the composer reduces the number of voices. According to musicologist Timothy Dickey, the final Amen "remains shockingly straightforward and simple. Schütz's hymn of thanksgiving for God's mercy ends in confidence, without undue artifice." Smith describes it as "austere and understated" and says that it "is permeated with the quiet ecstasy of that remarkable text".

== Publication and recordings ==
The works are part of the complete edition of the composer's works by Carus-Verlag, begun in 1992 in continuation of the Stuttgart Schütz Edition and planned to be completed by 2017. The edition uses the Heinrich-Schütz-Archiv of the Hochschule für Musik Dresden. It is combined with complete recordings by the Dresdner Kammerchor conducted by Hans-Christoph Rademann.
