= Geistliche Chor-Music =

Heinrich Schütz musical composition, printed 1648

- Motets by Heinrich Schütz
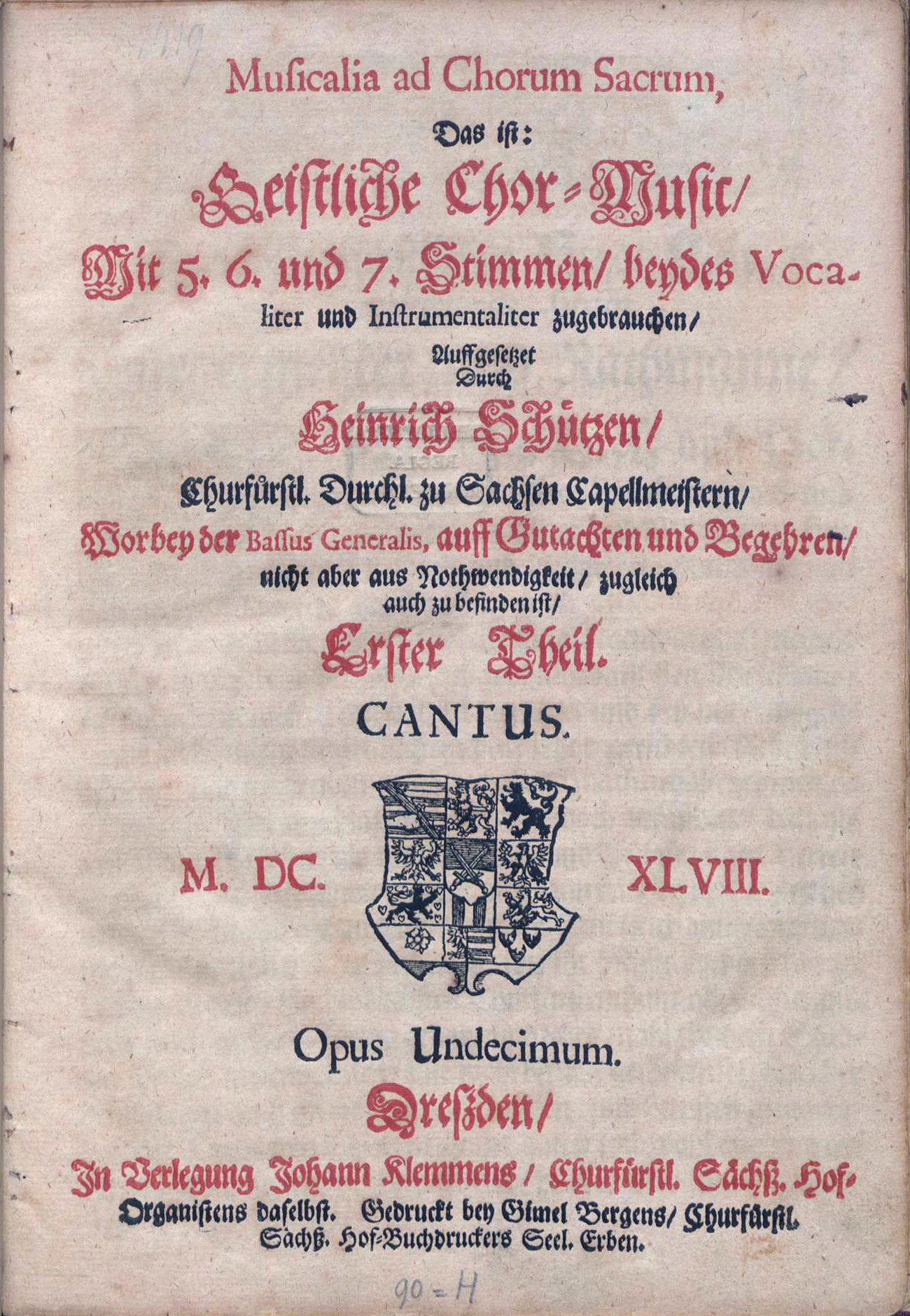
- Title page, 1648
- Catalogue: SWV 369 to 397
- Opus: 11
- Text: Biblical texts; hymns
- Language: German
- Dedication: Leipzig, its mayor, council and Thomanerchor
- Published: 21 April 1648 in Dresden
- Vocal: 5 to 7 voices

Geistliche Chor-Music (Sacred choral music) is a collection of motets on German texts for choir by Heinrich Schütz, a German early Baroque composer and organist. It was printed in Dresden in 1648 as his Opus Undecimum (Op. 11), and comprises 29 individual settings for five to seven voices, which were assigned numbers 369 to 397 in the Schütz-Werke-Verzeichnis (SWV). The original title was Geistliche Chor-Music, Erster Theil which indicates that Schütz planned a second part. It is also known as Geistliche Chor-Music 1648 and in modern German as Geistliche Chormusik. The collection contains earlier and new works and a German arrangement of a motet by Andrea Gabrieli.

== History ==
Schütz assembled a collection of 29 motets, which were assigned numbers 369 to 397 in the SWV, in 1648, the year that ended the Thirty Years' War. The original title was Geistliche Chor-Music, Erster Theil which indicates that Schütz planned at least a second part. The collection contains earlier and new works and a German arrangement of a motet by Andrea Gabrieli.

In an extended foreword, Schütz described the work as examples of composition in counterpoint without basso continuo, following the model of his teacher Giovanni Gabrieli in stile antico, writing: Geistliche Chor-Music / Mit 5. 6. und 7. Stimmen / beydes Vocaliter und Instrumentaliter zugebrauchen / Auffgesetzet / Durch / Heinrich Schützen / ... Worbey der Bassus Generalis auff Gutachten und Begehren / nicht aber aus Nothwendigkeit / zugleich auch zu befinden ist ... (sacred choir music / with 5 6 and 7 voices / to be used both vocally and instrumentally / set / by / Heinrich Schützen / ... the general bass can be used at the same time if liked and wanted / but is not necessary).

Schütz dedicated the collection to Leipzig, addressing the mayor and the town council and mentioning especially the choir, known now as the Thomanerchor. The dedication, dated "Dreßden, am 21. April 1648", is his first not to court and nobility.

== Collection ==
Schütz set mostly biblical texts, but also a few hymns. It contains "pleas for peace" such as "Verleih uns Frieden genädiglich" (Bestow peace upon us mercifully), which "react to the events of the day with more or less timeless, traditional texts". The first twelve motets are settings for five parts, the others for six or seven parts.

Translations are provided by Emmanuel Music, while the column "Source" offers the text of the King James Version of the Bible.

No.	SWV	Title	English	Source (and notes)
1	SWV 369	Es wird das Scepter von Juda nicht entwendet werden	The scepter shall not pass from Judah	Genesis 49:10-11
2	SWV 370	Er wird sein Kleid in Wein waschen	He will wash his garment in wine	Genesis 49:12
3	SWV 371	Es ist erschienen die heilsame Gnade Gottes allen Menschen	The grace of God that bringeth salvation hath appeared to all men	Titus 2:11-14
4	SWV 372	Verleih uns Frieden genädiglich	Grant us peace graciously	by Martin Luther and Johann Walter
5	SWV 373	Gib unsern Fürsten und aller Obrigkeit	Give our rulers and all lawgivers	continued
6	SWV 374	Unser keiner lebet ihm selber	For none of us liveth to himself	Romans 14:7-8
7	SWV 375	Viel werden kommen von Morgen und von Abend	Many shall come from the east and west	Matthew 8:11-12
8	SWV 376	Sammelt zuvor das Unkraut	First of all collect the chaff	Matthew 13:30
9	SWV 377	Herr, auf dich traue ich	Lord, I trust in You	Psalms 31:1-2
10	SWV 378	Die mit Tränen säen werden mit Freuden ernten	They who sow with tears will reap with joy	Psalms 126:5-6
11	SWV 379	So fahr ich hin zu Jesu Christ	Thus I journey to Jesus Christ	Anonymous
12	SWV 380	Also hat Gott die Welt geliebt	For God so loved the world	John 3:16
13	SWV 381	O lieber Herre Gott	O dear Lord God	Advent hymn
14	SWV 382	Tröstet, tröstet mein Volk	Comfort ye, comfort ye my people	Isaiah 40:1-5
15	SWV 383	Ich bin eine rufende Stimme	I am a voice crying	John 1:23,26-27
16	SWV 384	Ein Kind ist uns geboren	A child is born to us	Isaiah 9:6-7
17	SWV 385	Das Wort ward Fleisch	The Word was made flesh	John 1:14
18	SWV 386	Die Himmel erzählen die Ehre Gottes	The heavens describe the glory of God	Psalms 19:1-6 and doxology
19	SWV 387	Herzlich lieb hab ich dich, o Herr	I love you tenderly, o Lord.	"Herzlich lieb hab ich dich, o Herr"
20	SWV 388	Das ist je gewißlich wahr	This is a faithful saying	1 Timothy 1:15-17
21	SWV 389	Ich bin ein rechter Weinstock	I am the true vine	John 15:1-2,5a,4
22	SWV 390	Unser Wandel ist im Himmel	For our pilgrimage is to heaven	Philippians 3:20-21
23	SWV 391	Selig sind die Toten	Blessed are the dead	Selig sind die Toten (Revelation 14:13)
24	SWV 392	Was mein Gott will, das g'scheh allzeit	What my God wills always occurs	Albrecht von Brandenburg's "Was mein Gott will, das g'scheh allzeit"
25	SWV 393	Ich weiß, daß mein Erlöser lebt	I know that my Redeemer lives	Job 19:25-27
26	SWV 394	Sehet an den Feigenbaum	Behold the fig-tree and every tree	Luke 21:29-31,33
27	SWV 395	Der Engel sprach zu den Hirten	The angel said to the shepherds:	Luke 2:10-11, Isaiah 9:6, arrangement of Andrea Gabrieli
28	SWV 396	Auf dem Gebirge hat man ein Geschrei gehöret	Upon the peaks a cry is heard	Matthew 2:18
29	SWV 397	Du Schalksknecht	You wicked servant	Matthew 18:32-33

== Publication and recording ==
Geistliche Chor-Music was first published in Dresden by Johann Klemm. It was published by Breitkopf & Härtel as part of the first complete publication of the composer's works, edited by Philipp Spitta, begun in 1885. It was published by Bärenreiter as part of the new critical edition Neue Schütz-Ausgabe. The five-part motets (No. 1–12) appeared in 2003, the others in 2006. The collection is part of the complete edition of the composer's works by Carus-Verlag, begun in 1992 as the Stuttgart Schütz Edition and planned to be completed by 2017. The edition uses the Heinrich-Schütz-Archiv of the Hochschule für Musik Dresden. They were recorded, as part of the complete recordings of works by Schütz, in 2008 by the Dresdner Kammerchor and the Cappella Sagittariana, conducted by Hans-Christoph Rademann.

The motets have been frequently recorded individually or in selections. As of 2014, nine complete recordings were performed, making it the most frequently recorded of the collections by Schütz. Rudolf Mauersberger conducted the Dresdner Kreuzchor in 1962–63. Heinz Hennig conducted in 1981 to 1984 the Knabenchor Hannover with instruments, performing some motets with solo voices, others chorally, some with alternatives. Gerhard Schmidt-Gaden led a recording with the Tölzer Knabenchor in 1998, followed by Martin Behrmann, Manfred Cordes, Wilhelm Ehmann, Matteo Messori, Craig Smith and Masaaki Suzuki, Hans-Christoph Rademann among others.
