= Da pacem Domine =

Latin chant texts

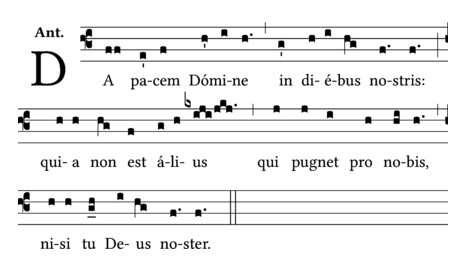
Da pacem Domine, in Gregorian chant, 9th century

Da pacem Domine (Give peace, Lord) is the incipit of two different Latin chant texts: a votive antiphon and an introit. Both have been the base for musical compositions to be used inside or outside the liturgy. Paraphrased versions of the text were created by Martin Luther in German in 1529, "Verleih uns Frieden", also set by several composers. In English, the first of these texts entered the Book of Common Prayer as one of the preces at Morning and Evening Prayer (Evensong).

== History and musical settings ==
=== Latin ===
The text dates from the 6th or 7th century and is based on biblical verses 2 Kings 20:19, 2 Chronicles 20:12,15 and Psalms 72:6–7.

Settings of the Latin text include Da pacem Domine by Arvo Pärt (2004) and Da pacem Domine by Juan María Solare (2018).

The inscription "Da pacem Domine" appears beside the figure of an angel playing on lute, on the so-called Jankovich saddle (c. 1408-1420), attributed to King Sigismund of Hungary.

=== German ===
Luther's "Verleih uns Frieden gnädiglich", 1533 print

Martin Luther wrote a paraphrase in German, "Verleih uns Frieden" and gave it a melody derived from chant. A second stanza, beginning "Gieb unsern Fürsten", was later added to Luther's text by Johann Walter and in this form the text endured as a chorale. Heinrich Schütz set the two parts as two motets, SWV 372 and 373, published in his collection Geistliche Chormusik in 1648. It appeared in cantatas by Johann Sebastian Bach. and in Verleih uns Frieden, a chorale cantata by Mendelssohn.

=== English ===
A translation of the antiphon entered the Book of Common Prayer as part of the preces at Morning and Evening Prayer (also known as Mattins and Evensong). The preces, also known as suffrages, are prayers in call-and-response format. Choral settings of these services, including this text, have been set by many composers, often titled Preces and Responses.

Priest. Give peace in our time, O Lord.
Answer. Because there is none other that fighteth for us, but only thou, O God.

The similar phrase Peace for our time has also been used in political contexts.

== The introit ==
A different text with the same first line is the introit for the Pentecost XVIII, based on Sirach 36:18 and Psalms 122:1 (Psalm 121 in the Vulgate). The text is as follows:

Da pacem, Domine, sustinentibus te ut prophetae tui fideles inveniantur: exaudi preces servi tui et plebis tuae Israël. V. Laetatus sum in his, quae dicta sunt mihi in domum Domini ibimus.

== See also ==
- List of hymns by Martin Luther

== Sources ==
- Da pacem Domine text and translations in the Choral Public Domain Library
- Da pacem Domine (Introit) text and translations in the Choral Public Domain Library
- Verleih uns Frieden German hymn in the Choral Public Domain Library
