= Verleih uns Frieden (Schütz) =

Motet by Heinrich Schütz, 1648

- Motet by Heinrich Schütz
- Catalogue: SWV 372
- Text: Luther's Verleih uns Frieden gnädiglich
- Language: German
- Published: 21 April 1648 in Dresden
- Vocal: 5 voices SSATB

"Verleih uns Frieden" (Grant us peace), SWV 372, is a motet for five voices (SSATB) by Heinrich Schütz, published in 1648 in his collection Geistliche Chor-Music. It is a prayer for peace based on "Verleih uns Frieden gnädiglich", Martin Luther's paraphrase of the Latin Da pacem Domine.

== History ==
Heinrich Schütz, working for the Dresden court for decades, composed the motet as No. 4 of 29 forming his collection Geistliche Chor-Music. He published the collection in 1648 as a celebration of the end of the Thirty Years' War. It contains motets for five to seven voices with optional basso continuo. They have in common that they are written in polyphony as attributed to Palestrina.

Schütz chose "Verleih uns Frieden gnädiglich" for the text, Luther's paraphrase of the Latin Da pacem Domine. The piece is followed by No. 5 "Gib unsern Fürsten und aller Obrigkeit" (Give our rulers and all lawgivers), which Johann Walter added to Luther's text to form one chorale. Both pieces are among the few in Geistliche Chor-Music that are not based on Biblical texts.

=== Luther's song ===
Luther's "Verleih uns Frieden gnädiglich", 1533 print

The Gregorian chant Da pacem Domine is one of the earliest prayers for peace, which Luther transformed into German:

Verleih uns Frieden genädiglich,
Herr Gott, zu unsern Zeiten.
Es ist doch ja kein andrer nicht,
der für uns könnte streiten,
denn du, unser Gott, alleine.

Luther's song is a prayer for political and social peace "in our time" ("zu unsern Zeiten"). It is seen as the result of a battle that only God can fight.

=== Motet ===
Schütz set "Verleih uns Frieden genädiglich" for five voices: two sopranos, alto, tenor and bass. Like the other motets in the collection, it features no basso continuo, in a style that had become unfashionable. Schütz meant the music as serving the meaning of the sacred texts.

=== Publications ===
Schütz published Geistliche Chor-Music in 1648, dedicated to the Thomanerchor in Leipzig, perhaps acknowledging their superiority and ability.

The prayer for peace has been published separately from the collection. It is often performed, more than other motets from the collection.
