= Christmas Story (Schütz) =

Musical setting of the Nativity

- by Heinrich Schütz
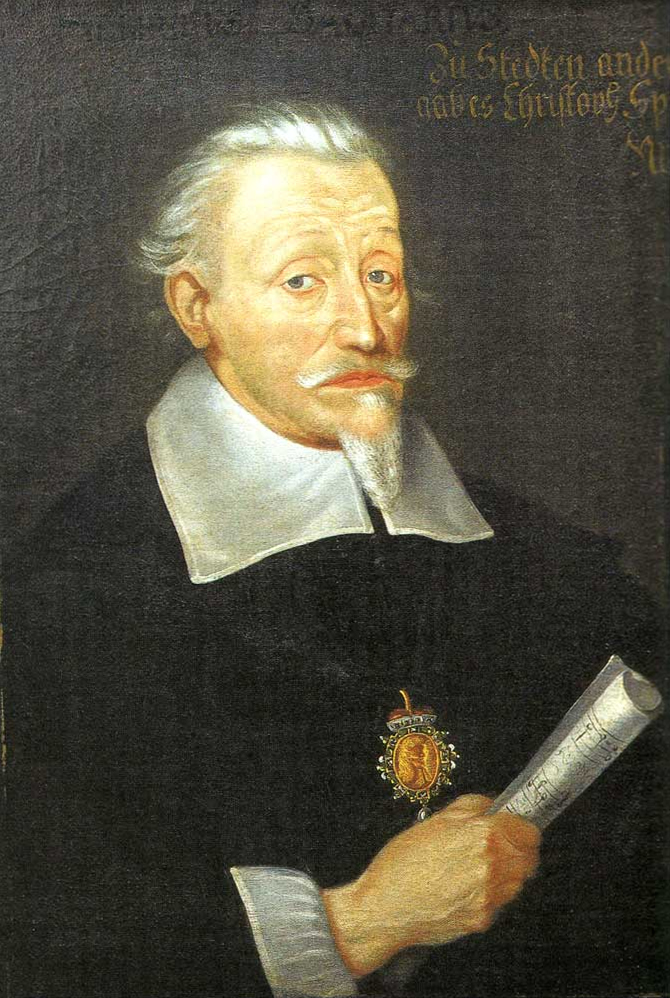
- The composer, c. 1650–60, by Christoph Spetner
- Native name: Historia der Geburt Jesu Christi
- Catalogue: SWV 435
- Form: Historia
- Occasion: Christmas
- Text: Nativity by Luke and Matthew
- Language: German
- Performed: 1660: Dresden, Court Chapel
- Published: 1664 (partly)
- Scoring: Soloists, choir and orchestra

The Christmas Story (Weihnachtshistorie), SWV 435, is a musical setting of the Nativity in German by Heinrich Schütz, probably first performed in 1660 in Dresden. It was published as Historia der Geburt Jesu Christi (Historia of the birth of Jesus Christ).

== History and words ==
Christmas Story is a Historia, a setting of the Gospel intended to be performed during a service instead of the Gospel reading. The original title read: Historia der freuden- und gnadenreichen Geburt Gottes und Marien Sohnes Jesu Christi (Historia of the joyful und blessed birth of Jesus Christ, son of God and Mary). Schütz had composed a Resurrection Story (Auferstehungshistorie) already in 1623, when he had taken the position of Kapellmeister at the court of the Elector of Saxony. The music was probably first performed in a Christmas service at the court chapel of Johann Georg II, Elector of Saxony, in Dresden in 1660. Schütz mentions the elector in the long title: "wie dieselbe auf Anordnung Johann Georgs des Anderen vocaliter und instrumentaliter in die Musik versetzet ist durch Heinrich Schütz" (as set to the music for voices and instruments on an order by Johann Georg the Second).

The text is almost exclusively taken from the Bible in the translation by Martin Luther, quoting both Luke and Matthew, framed by a choral Introduction and Beschluss (Conclusion). The biblical narration is based on Luke 2:1–21 and Matthew 2:1–23. The text of the conclusion is a translation of the Christmas sequence "Grates nunc omnes" by Johann Spangenberg (1545). The narrator is the Evangelist. Other characters appear in eight sections termed Intermedium (interlude): the angel to the shepherds, the hosts of angels, the shepherds, the wise men, priests and scribes, Herod, an angel to Joseph (twice).

The composer agreed to a publication of the recitatives in 1664, along with the text of the other parts. According to the postscript, probably written by Alexander Hering, a Kantor in Dresden, Schütz believed that his work could only be performed well by "fürstlichen Kapellen" (ducal chapels), but he offered a copy of the music for sale on request. This publication later appeared in his Sämtliche Werke (Complete works), Volume IX, in Leipzig, published by Julius Spitta 1885 to 1894. Arnold Schering discovered the parts at the Uppsala University Library in 1908. He published them in Volume XVII of the complete works.

== Scoring and music ==
The work is scored for soloists and choir in up to six parts (SSATTB) and orchestra. Carus-Verlag published a critical edition using two violins, two violas da gamba, two recorders, two trumpets, two trombones and basso continuo. It takes about 45 minutes to perform.

A late work, composed when Schütz was 75 years old, it shows a "mastery of means", "a work that never feels as eclectic as its influences". Schütz had travelled a lot and experienced the Thirty Years' War, contributing to the "serenity of the composer’s late works".

The Evangelist is a tenor singing secco recitative, a tradition which Bach continued. Schütz uses "Italian dramatic recitative style" to set Luther's German. Music historian Michael Zwiebach notes: "It has unexpected twists that emphasize particular words, and it shifts tonal centers rapidly to reflect dramatic events." The angel is sung by a soprano with two violins, a trio of shepherds is accompanied by pastoral recorders, the trio of the wise men by violins, and the words of the priests are set as a quartet accompanied by trombones. Herod is accompanied by trumpets, setting his worldly power apart from the "more potent, less showy, heavenly host".

== Sources ==
- Historia der Geburt Jesu Christi, SWV 435: Scores at the International Music Score Library Project
