= Heinrich Spitta =

- Born: 19 March 1902
- Died: 23 June 1972 (aged 70)
- Occupations: Music educator; Composer; Musicologist

Heinrich Arnold Theodor Spitta (19 March 1902 – 23 June 1972) was a German music educator, composer and musicologist.

== Life ==
Born in Strasbourg, Spitta came from a family of musicians and theologians. His father was the theologian Friedrich Spitta and his uncle the musicologist and Bach biographer Philipp Spitta.

Spitta studied with Arnold Mendelssohn and Hermann Grabner and was awarded a doctorate in 1927 at the Georg-August-Universität Göttingen with a dissertation about Heinrich Schütz.

In 1933, Spitta taught as a teacher at the Academy for Church and School Music in Berlin and was at the same time appointed to the cultural office of the Reichsjugendführer. He mainly composed choral works which were used in the celebrations of the Hitler Youth (e.g. Heilig Vaterland, 1934; Jahr überm Pflug, 1936). Due to this activity, he was partly included in the Unabkömmlichstellung (UK) und Zurückstellung and Gottbegnadeten list during the war.

From 1950 Spitta taught at the Leuphana University of Lüneburg, from 1957 as a professor. He retired in 1967. He died in Lüneburg at 70.

== Publications ==
- Heinrich Schuetz’ Orchester- und unveröffentlichte Werke. Göttingen 1927.

== Sources ==
- Fred K. Prieberg: Handbuch Deutsche Musiker 1933–1945, CD-Rom-Lexikon, Kiel 2004, p. 6720–6746.
