= List of compositions by Heinrich Schütz =

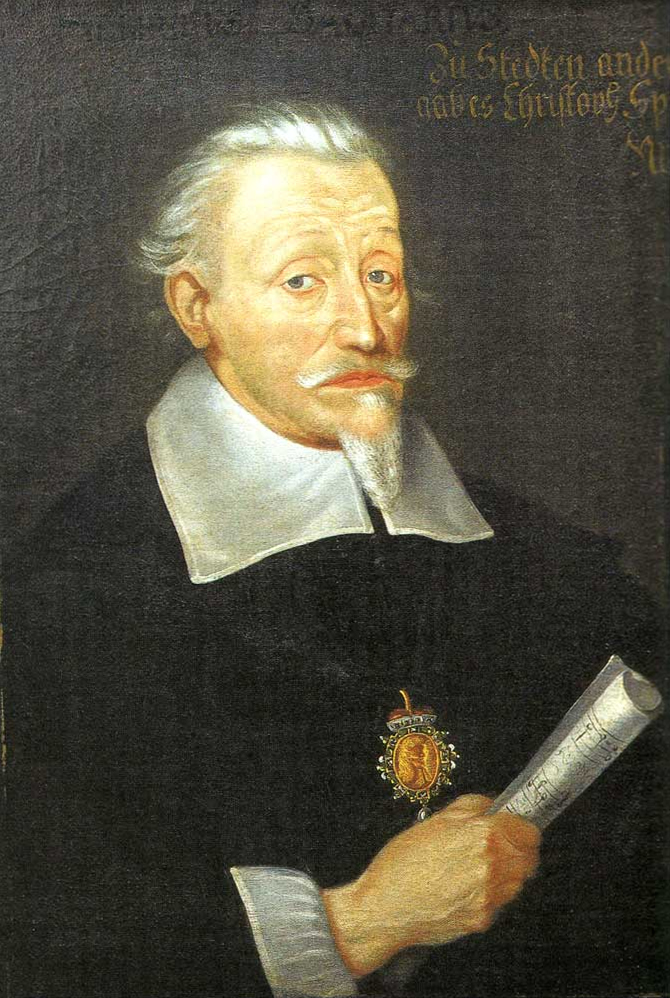
Heinrich Schütz, c. 1650–60 (Leipzig), by Christoph Spetner.

There are almost 500 known compositions by Heinrich Schütz. Listed here are most of his compositions in the order of the SWV (Schütz-Werke-Verzeichnis) catalog.

== Choral works ==
=== Italian Madrigals ===
Opus 1: Venice (1614) 5 voices

- SWV 1 – O primavera
- SWV 2 – O dolcezze amarissime
- SWV 3 – Selve beate
- SWV 4 – Alma afflitta
- SWV 5 – Così morir debb'io
- SWV 6 – D'orrida selce alpina
- SWV 7 – Ride la primavera
- SWV 8 – Fuggi o mio core
- SWV 9 – Feritevi, ferite
- SWV 10 – Flamma ch'allacia
- SWV 11 – Quella damma son io
- SWV 12 – Mi saluta costei
- SWV 13 – Io moro, eccho ch'io moro
- SWV 14 – Sospir che del bel petto
- SWV 15 – Dunque addio
- SWV 16 – Tornate, o cari baci
- SWV 17 – Di marmo siete voi
- SWV 18 – Giunto è pur, Lidia
- SWV 19 – Vasto mar – dedicatory madrigal to Moritz, Landgrave of Hesse, for 8 voices

=== Wedding concerts ===
- SWV 20 – Wohl dem, der ein tugendsam Weib hat, for wedding of Joseph Avenarius and Anna Dorothea Görlitz, Dresden, 21 April 1618.
- SWV 21 – Haus und Güter erbet man von Eltern, for wedding of Michael Thomas and Anna Schultes, Leipzig, 15 June 1618.

=== Psalmen Davids ===
German settings of the Psalms of David (Book 1)

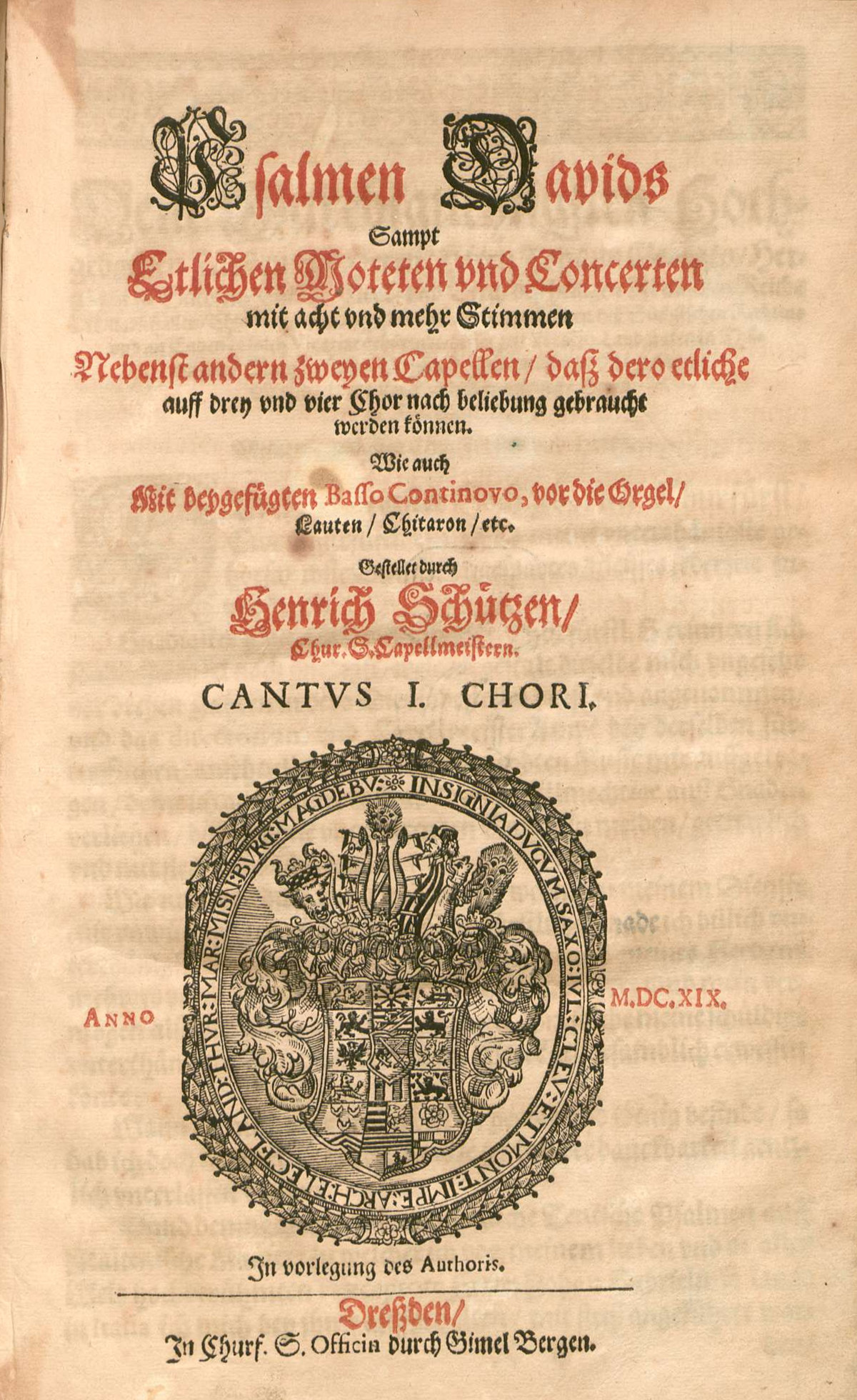
The original title page of Psalmen Davids

Opus 2: Dresden (1619)

- SWV 22 – Der Herr sprach zu meinem Herren (Psalm 110)
- SWV 23 – Warum toben die Heiden (Psalm 2)
- SWV 24 – Ach, Herr, straf mich nicht (Psalm 6)
- SWV 25 – Aus der Tiefe (Psalm 130)
- SWV 26 – Ich freu mich des (Psalm 122)
- SWV 27 – Herr, unser Herrscher (Psalm 8)
- SWV 28 – Wohl dem, der nicht wandelt (Psalm 1)
- SWV 29 – Wie lieblich sind deine Wohnungen (Psalm 84)
- SWV 30 – Wohl dem, der den Herren fürchtet (Psalm 128)
- SWV 31 – Ich hebe meine Augen auf (Psalm 121)
- SWV 32 – Danket dem Herren, denn er ist freundlich (Psalm 136)
- SWV 33 – Der Herr ist mein Hirt (Psalm 23)
- SWV 34 – Ich danke dem Herrn (Psalm 111)
- SWV 35 – Singet dem Herrn ein neues Lied (Psalm 98)
- SWV 36 – Jauchzet dem Herren, alle Welt (Psalm 100)
- SWV 37 – An den Wassern zu Babel (Psalm 137)
- SWV 38 – Alleluja! Lobet den Herren (Psalm 150)
- SWV 39 – Lobe den Herren, meine Seele (Concert)
- SWV 40 – Ist nicht Ephraim mein teurer Sohn (Motet)
- SWV 41 – Nun lob, mein Seel, den Herren (Canzon) on Johann Gramann's hymn
- SWV 42 – Die mit Tränen säen (Motet)
- SWV 43 – Nicht uns, Herr (Psalm 115)
- SWV 44 – Wohl dem, der den Herren fürchtet (Psalm 128)
- SWV 45 – Danket dem Herren, denn er ist freundlich (Psalm 136)
- SWV 46 – Zion spricht, der Herr hat mich verlassen (Concert)
- SWV 47 – Jauchzet dem Herren, alle Welt (Concert)

=== Psalm 133 (1619) ===
- SWV 48 – Siehe, wie fein und lieblich ist's

=== Syncharma musicum ===
Breslau 1621

- SWV 49 – En novus Elysiis – ceremonial motet for the oaths of allegiance of the Silesian nobility to Johann Georg of Saxony as the representative of Emperor Ferdinand (Breslau 1621).

=== Die Auferstehung unsres Herren Jesu Christi ===
Opus 3: Dresden (1623)

- SWV 50 – Historia der Auferstehung Jesu Christi (Resurrection Story)

=== Psalm 116 (1619) ===
One of sixteen composers who composed a setting of Das ist mir lieb (Psalm 116) for Angst der Hellen und Friede der Seelen, commissioned in 1616 by Burckhard Grossmann of Jena, published in 1623.

- SWV 51 – Das ist mir lieb

=== Grimmige Gruft (1622/3) ===
- SWV 52 – Kläglicher Abschied von der Churfürstlichen Grufft zu Freybergk – text by Schütz, on the death of Duchess Sophie of Brandenburg, 7 Dec 1622, mother of John George I, Elector of Saxony.

=== Cantiones sacrae ===
Opus 4: Freiberg (1625)

- SWV 53 – O bone, o dulcis, o benigne Jesu
- SWV 54 – Et ne despicias humiliter te petentem
- SWV 55 – Deus misereatur nostri, et benedicat nobis
- SWV 56 – Quid commisisti, o dulcissime puer?
- SWV 57 – Ego sum tui plaga doloris
- SWV 58 – Ego enim inique egi
- SWV 59 – Quo, nate Dei, quo tua descendit humilitas
- SWV 60 – Calicem salutaris accipiam
- SWV 61 – Verba mea auribus percipe, Domine
- SWV 62 – Quoniam ad te clamabo, Domine
- SWV 63 – Ego dormio, et cor meum vigilat
- SWV 64 – Vulnerasti cor meum, filia charissima
- SWV 65 – Heu mihi, Domine, quia peccavi nimis
- SWV 66 – In te, Domine, speravi
- SWV 67 – Dulcissime et benignissime Christe
- SWV 68 – Sicut Moses serpentem in deserto exaltabit
- SWV 69 – Spes mea, Christe Deus, hominum tu dolcis amator
- SWV 70 – Turbabor, sed non pertubabor
- SWV 71 – Ad Dominum cum tribularer clamavi
- SWV 72 – Quid detur tibi aut quid apponatur tibi
- SWV 73 – Aspice pater piissimum filium
- SWV 74 – Nonne hic est, mi Domine, innocens ille
- SWV 75 – Reduc, Domine Deus meus, oculos majestatis
- SWV 76 – Supereminet omnem scientiam, o bone Jesu
- SWV 77 – Pro hoc magno mysterio pietatis
- SWV 78 – Domine, non est exaltatum cor meum
- SWV 79 – Si non humiliter sentiebam
- SWV 80 – Speret Israel in Domino
- SWV 81 – Cantate Domino canticum novum
- SWV 82 – Inter brachia Salvatoris mei
- SWV 83 – Veni, rogo in cor meum
- SWV 84 – Ecce advocatus meus apud te, Deum patrem
- SWV 85 – Domine, ne in furore tuo arguas me
- SWV 86 – Quoniam non est in morte qui memor sit tui
- SWV 87 – Discedite a me omnes qui operamini
- SWV 88 – Oculi omnium in te sperant, Domine
- SWV 89 – Pater noster, qui es in cœlis
- SWV 90 – Domine Deus, pater cœlestis, benedic nobis
- SWV 91 – Confitemini Domino, quoniam ipse bonus
- SWV 92 – Pater noster: Repetatur ut supra
- SWV 93 – Gratias agimus tibi, Domine Deus Pater

=== Aria: De vitae fugacitate (1625) ===
- SWV 94 – De vitae fugacitate "Ich hab mein Sach Gott heimgestellt" – on the death of Schütz' sister in law Anna Maria Wildeck, three weeks before the death of Schütz' wife Magdalena herself after 6 years of marriage.

=== Last words of Psalm 23 (1625) ===
- SWV 95 – Ultima verba psalmi 23 – "Gutes und Barmherzigkeit" (Psalm 23; 1625), on the death of student Jakob Schultes, brother of the wife in the wedding motet SWV21.

=== Glück zu dem Helikon (1627) ===
- SWV 96 – Glück zu dem Helikon – for the graduation of Johann Nauwach

=== Becker Psalter ===
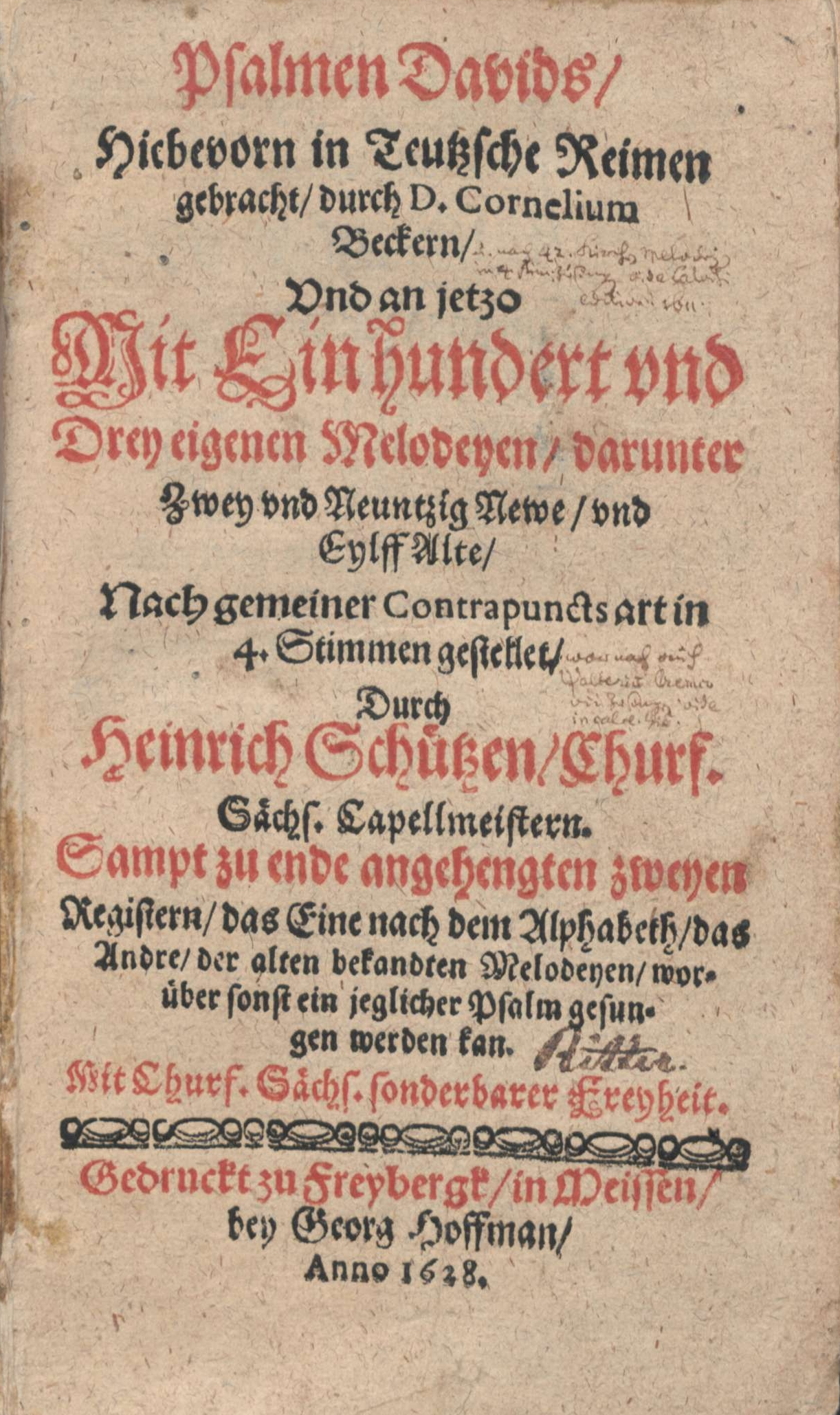
1628 first edition of Heinrich Schütz's Becker Psalter, Op. 5

Psalmen Davids: Hiebevorn in Teutzsche Reimen gebracht durch D. Cornelium Beckern, Opus 5: Freiberg (1628), revised Dresden (1661)

- SWV 97 – Wer nicht sitzt im Gottlosen Rat (Psalm 1)
- SWV 98 – Was haben doch die Leut im Sinn (Psalm 2)
- SWV 99 – Ach wie groß ist der Feinde Rott (Psalm 3)
- SWV 100 – Erhör mich, wenn ich ruf zu dir (Psalm 4)
- SWV 101 – Herr, hör, was ich will bitten dich (Psalm 5)
- SWV 102 – Ach Herr mein Gott, straf mich doch nicht (Psalm 6)
- SWV 103 – Auf dich trau ich, mein Herr und Gott (Psalm 7)
- SWV 104 – Mit Dank wir sollen loben (Psalm 8)
- SWV 105 – Mit fröhlichem Gemüte (Psalm 9)
- SWV 106 – Wie meinst du's doch, ach Herr, mein Gott (Psalm 10)
- SWV 107 – Ich trau auf Gott, was soll's denn sein (Psalm 11)
- SWV 108 – Ach Gott, von Himmel sieh darein (Psalm 12)
- SWV 109 – Ach Herr, wie lang willst du denn noch (Psalm 13)
- SWV 110 – Es spricht der Unweisen Mund wohl (Psalm 14)
- SWV 111 – Wer wird, Herr, in der Hütten dein (Psalm 15)
- SWV 112 – Bewahr mich, Gott, ich trau auf dich (Psalm 16)
- SWV 113 – Herr Gott, erhör die Grechtigkeit (Psalm 17)
- SWV 114 – Ich lieb dich, Herr, von Herzen sehr (Psalm 18)
- SWV 115 – Die Himmel, Herr, preisen Dein göttliche Macht und Ehr (Psalm 19)
- SWV 116 – Der Herr erhört dich in der Not (Psalm 20)
- SWV 117 – Hoch freuet sich der König (Psalm 21)
- SWV 118 – Mein Gott, mein Gott, ach Herr, mein Gott (Psalm 22, 1st Part)
- SWV 119 – Ich will verkündgen in der Gmein (Psalm 22, 2nd Part)
- SWV 120 – Der Herr ist mein getreuer Hirt (Psalm 23)
- SWV 121 – Die Erd und was sich auf ihr regt (Psalm 24)
- SWV 122 – Nach dir verlangt mich (Psalm 25)
- SWV 123 – Herr, schaff mir Recht, nimm dich mein an (Psalm 26)
- SWV 124 – Mein Licht und Heil ist Gott der Herr (Psalm 27)
- SWV 125 – Ich ruf zu dir, Herr Gott, mein Hort (Psalm 28)
- SWV 126 – Bring Ehr und Preis dem Herren (Psalm 29)
- SWV 127 – Ich preis dich, Herr, zu aller Stund (Psalm 30)
- SWV 128 – In dich hab ich gehoffet, Herr (Psalm 31)
- SWV 129 – Der Mensch vor Gott wohl selig ist (Psalm 32)
- SWV 130 – Freut euch des Herrn, ihr Christen all (Psalm 33)
- SWV 131 – Ich will bei meinem Leben rühmen den Herren mein (Psalm 34)
- SWV 132 – Herr, hader mit den Hadrern mein (Psalm 35)
- SWV 133 – Ich sag's von Grund meins Herzens frei (Psalm 36)
- SWV 134 – Erzürn dich nicht so sehre (Psalm 37)
- SWV 135 – Herr, straf mich nicht in deinem Zorn (Psalm 38)
- SWV 136 – In meinem Herzen hab ich mir (Psalm 39)
- SWV 137 – Ich harrete des Herren (Psalm 40)
- SWV 138 – Wohl mag der sein ein selig Mann (Psalm 41)
- SWV 139 – Gleich wie ein Hirsch eilt mit Begier (Psalm 42)
- SWV 140 – Gott, führ mein Sach und richte mich (Psalm 43)
- SWV 141 – Wir haben, Herr, mit Fleiß gehört (Psalm 44)
- SWV 142 – Mein Herz dichtet ein Lied mit Fleiß (Psalm 45)
- SWV 143 – Ein feste Burg ist unser Gott (Psalm 46)
- SWV 144 – Frohlockt mit Freud, ihr Völker all (Psalm 47)
- SWV 145 – Groß ist der Herr und hoch gepreist (Psalm 48)
- SWV 146 – Hört zu ihr Völker in gemein (Psalm 49)
- SWV 147 – Gott unser Herr, mächtig durchs Wort (Psalm 50)
- SWV 148 – Erbarm dich mein, o Herre Gott (Psalm 51)
- SWV 149 – Was trotzst denn du, Tyrann, so hoch (Psalm 52)
- SWV 150 – Es spricht der Unweisen Mund wohl (Psalm 53)
- SWV 151 – Hilf mir, Gott, durch den Namen dein (Psalm 54)
- SWV 152 – Erhör mein Gebet, du treuer Gott (Psalm 55)
- SWV 153 – Herr Gott, erzeig mir Hülf und Gnad (Psalm 56)
- SWV 154 – Sei mir gnädig, o Gott, mein Herr (Psalm 57)
- SWV 155 – Wie nun, ihr Herren, seid ihr stumm (Psalm 58)
- SWV 156 – Hilf, Herre Gott, errette mich (Psalm 59)
- SWV 157 – Ach Gott, der du vor dieser Zeit (Psalm 60)
- SWV 158 – Gott, mein Geschrei erhöre (Psalm 61)
- SWV 159 – Mein Seel ist still in meinem Gott (Psalm 62)
- SWV 160 – O Gott, du mein getreuer Gott (Psalm 63)
- SWV 161 – Erhör mein Stimm, Herr, wenn ich klag (Psalm 64)
- SWV 162 – Gott, man lobt dich in der Still (Psalm 65)
- SWV 163 – Jauchzet Gott, alle Lande sehr (Psalm 66)
- SWV 164 – Es woll uns Gott genädig sein (Psalm 67), paraphrased in a hymn by Martin Luther
- SWV 165 – Es steh Gott auf, daß seine Feind (Psalm 68)
- SWV 166 – Gott hilf mir, denn das Wasser dringt (Psalm 69)
- SWV 167 – Eil, Herr mein Gott, zu retten mich (Psalm 70)
- SWV 168 – Auf dich, Herr, trau ich alle Zeit (Psalm 71)
- SWV 169 – Gott, gib dem König auserkorn (Psalm 72)
- SWV 170 – Dennoch hat Israel zum Trost (Psalm 73)
- SWV 171 – Warum verstößt du uns so gar (Psalm 74)
- SWV 172 – Aus unsers Herzen Grunde (Psalm 75)
- SWV 173 – In Juda ist der Herr bekannt (Psalm 76)
- SWV 174 – Ich ruf zu Gott mit meiner Stimm (Psalm 77)
- SWV 175 – Hör, mein Volk, mein Gesetz und Weis (Psalm 78)
- SWV 176 – Ach Herr, es ist der Heiden Herr (Psalm 79)
- SWV 177 – Du Hirt Israel, höre uns (Psalm 80)
- SWV 178 – Singet mit Freuden unserm Gott (Psalm 81)
- SWV 179 – Merkt auf, die ihr an Gottes Statt (Psalm 82)
- SWV 180 – Gott, schweig du nicht so ganz und gar (Psalm 83)
- SWV 181 – Wie sehr lieblich und schöne sind doch die Wohnung dein (Psalm 84)
- SWV 182 – Herr, der du vormals gnädig warst (Psalm 85)
- SWV 183 – Herr, neig zu mir dein gnädigs Ohr (Psalm 86)
- SWV 184 – Fest ist gegründet Gottes Stadt (Psalm 87)
- SWV 185 – Herr Gott, mein Heiland, Nacht und Tag (Psalm 88)
- SWV 186 – Ich will von Gnade singen (Psalm 89, 1st Part)
- SWV 187 – Ach Gott, warum verstößt du nun (Psalm 89, Other Part)
- SWV 188 – Herr Gott Vater im höchsten Thron (Psalm 90)
- SWV 189 – Wer sich des Höchsten Schirm vertraut (Psalm 91)
- SWV 190 – Es ist fürwahr ein köstlich Ding (Psalm 92)
- SWV 191 – Der Herr ist König herrlich schön (Psalm 93)
- SWV 192 – Gott, dem alle Rach heimfällt (Psalm 94)
- SWV 193 – Kommt herzu, laßt uns fröhlich sein (Psalm 95)
- SWV 194 – Singet dem Herrn ein neues Lied (Psalm 96)
- SWV 195 – Der Herr ist König überall (Psalm 97)
- SWV 196 – Singet dem Herrn ein neues Lied (Psalm 98)
- SWV 197 – Der Herr ist König und residiert (Psalm 99)
- SWV 198 – Jauchzet dem Herren, alle Welt (Psalm 100)
- SWV 199 – Von Gnad und Recht soll singen Psalm 101)
- SWV 200 – Hör mein Gebet und laß zu dir (Psalm 102)
- SWV 201 – Nun lob, mein Seel, den Herren (Psalm 103)
- SWV 202 – Herr, dich lob die Seele mein (Psalm 104)
- SWV 203 – Danket dem Herren, lobt ihn frei (Psalm 105)
- SWV 204 – Danket dem Herrn, erzeigt ihm Ehr (Psalm 106)
- SWV 205 – Danket dem Herren, unserm Gott (Psalm 107)
- SWV 206 – Mit rechtem Ernst und fröhlichm Mut (Psalm 108)
- SWV 207 – Herr Gott, deß ich mich rühmte viel (Psalm 109)
- SWV 208 – Der Herr sprach zu meim Herren (Psalm 110)
- SWV 209 – Ich will von Herzen danken Gott dem Herren (Psalm 111)
- SWV 210 – Der ist fürwahr ein selig Mann (Psalm 112)
- SWV 211 – Lobet, ihr Knecht, den Herren (Psalm 113)
- SWV 212 – Als das Volk Israel auszog (Psalm 114)
- SWV 213 – Nicht uns, nicht uns, Herr, lieber Gott (Psalm 115)
- SWV 214 – Meim Herzen ist's ein große Freud (Psalm 116)
- SWV 215 – Lobt Gott mit Schall, ihr Heiden all (Psalm 117)
- SWV 216 – Laßt uns Gott, unserm Herren (Psalm 118)
- SWV 217 – Wohl denen, die da leben (Psalm 119, Parts 1,2)
- SWV 218 – Tu wohl, Herr, deinem Knechte (Psalm 119, Parts 3,4,5)
- SWV 219 – Laß mir Gnad widerfahren (Psalm 119, Parts 6,7,8)
- SWV 220 – Du trust viel Guts beweisen (Psalm 119, Parts 9,10,11)
- SWV 221 – Dein Wort, Herr, nicht vergehet (Psalm 119, Parts 12,13,14)
- SWV 222 – Ich haß die Flattergeister (Psalm 119, Parts 15,16,17)
- SWV 223 – Dir gbührt allein die Ehre (Psalm 119, Parts 18,19,20)
- SWV 224 – Fürsten sind meine Feinde (Psalm 119, Parts 21,22)
- SWV 225 – Ich ruf zu dir, mein Herr und Gott (Psalm 120)
- SWV 226 – Ich heb mein Augen sehnlich auf (Psalm 121)
- SWV 227 – Es ist ein Freud dem Herzen mein (Psalm 122)
- SWV 228 – Ich heb mein Augen auf zu dir (Psalm 123)
- SWV 229 – Wär Gott nicht mit uns diese Zeit (Psalm 124) on Luther's hymn "Wär Gott nicht mit uns diese Zeit"
- SWV 230 – Die nur vertraulich stellen (Psalm 125)
- SWV 231 – Wenn Gott einmal erlösen wird (Psalm 126)
- SWV 232 – Wo Gott zum Haus nicht gibt sein Gunst (Psalm 127)
- SWV 233 – Wohl dem, der in Gottesfurcht steht (Psalm 128)
- SWV 234 – Die Feind haben mich oft gedrängt (Psalm 129)
- SWV 235 – Aus tiefer Not schrei ich zu dir (Psalm 130) on Luther's hymn "Aus tiefer Not schrei ich zu dir"
- SWV 236 – Herr, mein Gemüt und Sinn du weißt (Psalm 131)
- SWV 237 – In Gnaden, Herr, wollst eindenk sein (Psalm 132)
- SWV 238 – Wie ist's so fein, lieblich und schön (Psalm 133)
- SWV 239 – Den Herren lobt mit Freuden (Psalm 134)
- SWV 240 – Lobt Gott von Herzengrunde (Psalm 135)
- SWV 241 – Danket dem Herren, gebt ihn Ehr (Psalm 136)
- SWV 242 – An Wasserflüssen Babylon (Psalm 137) on Wolfgang Dachstein's "An Wasserflüssen Babylon"
- SWV 243 – Aus meines Herzens Grunde (Psalm 138)
- SWV 244 – Herr, du erforschst mein Sinne (Psalm 139)
- SWV 245 – Von bösen Menschen rette mich (Psalm 140)
- SWV 246 – Herr, mein Gott, wenn ich ruf zu dir (Psalm 141)
- SWV 247 – Ich schrei zu meinem lieben Gott (Psalm 142)
- SWV 248 – Herr, mein Gebet erhör in Gnad (Psalm 143)
- SWV 249 – Gelobet sei der Herr, mein Hort (Psalm 144)
- SWV 250 – Ich will sehr hoch erhöhen dich (Psalm 145)
- SWV 251 – Mein Seel soll loben Gott den Herrn (Psalm 146)
- SWV 252 – Zu Lob und Ehr mit Freuden singt (Psalm 147)
- SWV 253 – Lobet, ihr Himmel, Gott den Herrn (Psalm 148)
- SWV 254 – Die heilige Gemeine (Psalm 149)
- SWV 255 – Lobt Gott in seinem Heiligtum (Psalm 150)
- SWV 256 – Responsorium

=== Symphoniae sacrae I ===
Symphoniae sacrae I, Opus 6: Venice (1629)

- SWV 257 – Paratum cor meum, Deus
- SWV 258 – Exultavit cor meum in Domino
- SWV 259 – In te, Domine, speravi
- SWV 260 – Cantabo domino in vita mea
- SWV 261 – Venite ad me omnes qui laboratis
- SWV 262 – Jubilate Deo omnis terra
- SWV 263 – Anima mea liquefacta est
- SWV 264 – Adjuro vos, filiae Jerusalem
- SWV 265 – O quam tu pulchra es, amica mea
- SWV 266 – Veni de Libano, veni, amica mea
- SWV 267 – Benedicam Dominum in omni tempore
- SWV 268 – Exquisivi Dominum et exaudivit me
- SWV 269 – Fili mi, Absalon
- SWV 270 – Attendite, popule meus
- SWV 271 – Domine, labia mea aperies
- SWV 272 – In lectulo per noctes
- SWV 273 – Invenerunt me costudes civitatis
- SWV 274 – Veni, dilecte mi, in hortum meum
- SWV 275 – Buccinate in neomenia tuba
- SWV 276 – Jubilate Deo in chordis

=== Funeral motet on the death of Johann Hermann Schein (1630) ===
- SWV 277 – Das ist je gewißlich wahr

=== O der großen Wuntertaten (1633/4) ===
- SWV 278 – O der großen Wuntertaten

=== Musikalische Exequien ===
Opus 7: Dresden (1636) for the funeral of de:Heinrich II. (Reuß-Gera)

- SWV 279 – Nacket bin ich vom Mutterleib gekommen
- SWV 280 – Herr, wenn ich nur dich habe
- SWV 281 – Herr, nun lässest du deinen Diener in Friede fahren

=== Erster Theil kleiner geistlichen Concerten ===
Opus 8: Leipzig, 1636

- SWV 282 – Eile, mich, Gott, zu erretten, Herr, mir zu helfen
- SWV 283 – Bringt her dem Herren, ihr Gewaltigen
- SWV 284 – Ich danke dem Herrn von ganzem Herzen
- SWV 285 – O süßer, o freundlicher, o gütiger Herr Jesu Christe
- SWV 286 – Der Herr ist groß
- SWV 287 – O lieber Herre Gott
- SWV 288 – Ihr Heiligen, lobsinget dem Herren
- SWV 289 – Erhöre mich, wenn ich rufe
- SWV 290 – Wohl dem, der nicht wandelt im Rat der Gottlosen
- SWV 291 – Schaffe in mir, Gott, ein reines Herz
- SWV 292 – Der Herr schauet vom Himmel
- SWV 293 – Lobet den Herren, der zu Zion wohnet
- SWV 294 – Eins bitte ich vom Herren
- SWV 295 – O hilf, Christe, Gottes Sohn
- SWV 296 – Fürchte dich nicht
- SWV 297 – O Herr hilf
- SWV 298 – Das Blut Jesu Christi
- SWV 299 – Die Gottseligkeit
- SWV 300 – Himmel und Erde vergehen
- SWV 301 – Nun komm, der Heiden Heiland, on "Nun komm, der Heiden Heiland"
- SWV 302 – Ein Kind ist uns geboren
- SWV 303 – Wir gläuben all an einen Gott
- SWV 304 – Siehe, mein Fürsprecher ist im Himmel
- SWV 305 – Ich hab mein Sach Gott heimgestellt

=== Kleine Geistliche Konzerte II ===
Opus 9: Leipzig, 1639

- SWV 306 – Ich will den Herren loben allezeit
- SWV 307 – Was hast du verwirket
- SWV 308 – O Jesu, nomen dulce
- SWV 309 – O misericordissime Jesu
- SWV 310 – Ich liege und schlafe
- SWV 311 – Habe deine Lust an dem Herren
- SWV 312 – Herr, ich hoffe darauf
- SWV 313 – Bone Jesu, verbum Patris
- SWV 314 – Verbum caro factum est
- SWV 315 – Hodie Christus natus est
- SWV 316 – Quando se clandunt lumina
- SWV 317 – Meister, wir haben die ganze Nacht gearbeitet
- SWV 318 – Die Furcht des Herren ist der Weisheit Anfang
- SWV 319 – Ich beuge meine Knie
- SWV 320 – Ich bin jung gewesen und bin alt worden
- SWV 321 – Herr, wenn ich nur dich habe
- SWV 322 – Rorate coeli desuper
- SWV 323 – Joseph, du Sohn David
- SWV 324 – Ich bin die Auferstehung
- SWV 325 – Die Seele Christi heilige mich
- SWV 326 – Te Christe supplex in voco
- SWV 327 – Allein Gott in der Höh sei Ehr
- SWV 328 – Veni, sancte Spiritus
- SWV 329 – Ist Gott für uns
- SWV 330 – Wer will uns scheiden von der Liebe Gottes?
- SWV 331 – Die Stimm des Herren geht auf den Wassern
- SWV 332 – Jubilate Deo omnis terra
- SWV 333 – Sei gegrüßet, Maria
- SWV 334 – Ave, Maria
- SWV 335 – Was betrübst du dich, meine Seele
- SWV 336 – Quemadmodum desiderat
- SWV 337 – Aufer immensam, Deus, aufer iram

=== Teutoniam dudum (1621) ===
Breslau 1621, Leipzig, published 1641

- SWV 338 – Teutoniam dudum belli atra pericla molestant. Zur Huldigung der schlesischen Stände. Probably for the oath of loyalty to Johann Georg. Ceremonial text: "Omnibus o bona pax gaudia mille ferat. Laetentur cives patulo gens omnis in orbe, In Patria dulci prosperitate nova. Tota Slesis resonet, resonet jam tota Budorgis: Omnibus o bona pax gaudia" (Also SWV338:2 with alternative ecclesiastic text: Adveniunt pascha pleno concelebranda triumpho )

=== Ich beschwöre euch (1638) ===
Leipzig, 1641

- SWV 339 – Ich beschwöre euch, ihr Töchter zu Jerusalem (Dialogus)

=== O du allersüßester und liebster Herr Jesu ===
Leipzig, 1646

- SWV 340 – O du allersüßester und liebster Herr Jesu

=== Symphoniae sacrae II ===
Opus 10: Dresden (1647)

- SWV 341 – Mein Herz ist bereit, Gott, mein Herz ist bereit
- SWV 342 – Singet dem Herren ein neues Lied
- SWV 343 – Herr, unser Herrscher, wie herrlich ist dein Nam
- SWV 344 – Meine Seele erhebt den Herren
- SWV 345 – Der Herr ist meine Stärke
- SWV 346 – Ich werde nicht sterben
- SWV 347 – Ich danke dir, Herr, von ganzem Herzen
- SWV 348 – Herzlich lieb hab ich dich, o Herr on Schalling's hymn
- SWV 349 – Frohlocket mit Händen
- SWV 350 – Lobet den Herrn in seinem Heiligtum
- SWV 351 – Hütet euch, daß eure Herzen nicht beschweret werden
- SWV 352 – Herr, nun lässest du deinen Diener im Friede fahren
- SWV 353 – Was betrübst du dich, meine Seele
- SWV 354 – Verleih uns Frieden genädiglich
- SWV 355 – Gib unsern Fürsten und aller Obrigkeit
- SWV 356 – Es steh Gott auf
- SWV 357 – Wie ein Rubin in feinem Golde leuchtet
- SWV 358 – Iß dein Brot mit Freuden
- SWV 359 – Der Herr ist mein Licht und mein Heil
- SWV 360 – Zweierlei bitte ich, von dir, Herr
- SWV 361 – Herr, neige deine Himmel und fahr herab
- SWV 362 – Von Aufgang der Sonnen
- SWV 363 – Lobet den Herrn, alle Heiden
- SWV 364 – Die so ihr den Herren fürchtet
- SWV 365 – Drei schöne Dinge seind
- SWV 366 – Von Gott will ich nicht lassen
- SWV 367 – Freuet euch des Herren, ihr Gerechten

=== Aria: Danklied ===
- SWV 368 – Fürstliche Gnade zu Wasser und zu Lande 1647 Danck-Lied. Für die hocherwiesene Fürstl. Gnade in Weimar. Text: Christian Timotheus Dufft, for the birthday of Eleonora wife of Wilhelm IV. of Sachsen-Weimar (1598-1662); accompanying ballet is lost.

=== Geistliche Chormusik ===
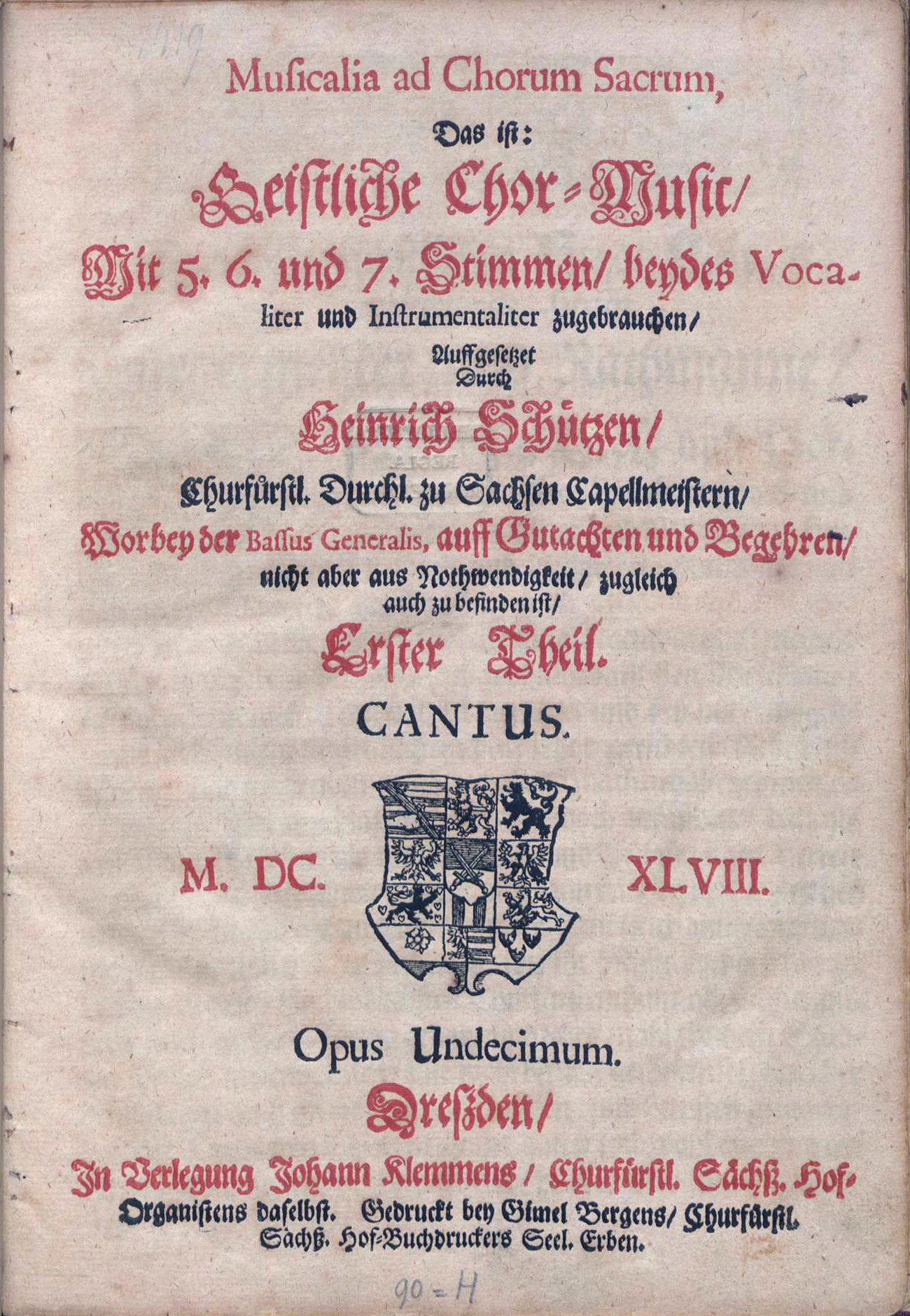
The original title page of Geistliche Chor-Music

Opus 11: Dresden (1648)

- SWV 369 – Es wird das Scepter von Juda nicht entwendet werden
- SWV 370 – Er wird sein Kleid in Wein waschen
- SWV 371 – Es ist erschienen die heilsame Gnade Gottes allen Menschen
- SWV 372 – Verleih uns Frieden genädiglich
- SWV 373 – Gib unserm Fürsten und aller Obrigkeit
- SWV 374 – Unser keiner lebet sich selber
- SWV 375 – Viel werden kommen von Morgen und von Abend
- SWV 376 – Sammelt zuvor das Unkraut
- SWV 377 – Herr, auf dich traue ich
- SWV 378 – Die mit Tränen säen werden mit Freuden ernten
- SWV 379 – So fahr ich hin zu Jesu Christ
- SWV 380 – Also hat Gott die Welt geliebt
- SWV 381 – O lieber Herre Gott
- SWV 382 – Tröstet, tröstet mein Volk
- SWV 383 – Ich bin eine rufende Stimme
- SWV 384 – Ein Kind ist uns geboren
- SWV 385 – Das Wort ward Fleisch
- SWV 386 – Die Himmel erzählen die Ehre Gottes
- SWV 387 – Herzlich lieb hab ich dich, o Herr
- SWV 388 – Das ist je gewißlich wahr
- SWV 389 – Ich bin ein rechter Weinstock
- SWV 390 – Unser Wandel ist im Himmel
- SWV 391 – Selig sind die Toten
- SWV 392 – Was mein Gott will, das g'scheh allzeit
- SWV 393 – Ich weiß, daß mein Erlöser lebt
- SWV 394 – Sehet an den Feigenbaum
- SWV 395 – Der Engel sprach zu den Hirten
- SWV 396 – Auf dem Gebirge hat man ein Geschrei gehöret
- SWV 397 – Du Schalksknecht

=== Symphoniae sacrae III ===
Opus 12: Dresden (1650)

- SWV 398 – Der Herr ist mein Hirt, S, A, T, 2 vn, compl. 4vv and insts ad lib, bc
- SWV 399 – Ich hebe meine Augen auf, A, T, B, 2 vn, compl. 4vv and insts ad lib, bc
- SWV 400 – Wo der Herr nicht das Haus bauet, 2 S, B, vn, cornettino/vn, compl. 4vv and insts ad lib, bc
- SWV 401 – Mein Sohn, warum hast du uns das getan (in dialogo), S, Mez, B, 2 vn, compl. 4vv and insts ad lib, bc
- SWV 402 – O Herr hilf, 2 S, T, 2 vn, bc
- SWV 403 – Siehe, es erschien der Engel des Herren, S, 2 T, B, 2 vn, compl. 4vv and insts ad lib, bc
- SWV 404 – Feget den alten Sauerteig aus, S, A, T, B, 2 vn, bc
- SWV 405 – O süsser Jesu Christ, 2 S, A, T, 2 vn, compl. 4vv and insts ad lib, bc
- SWV 406 – O Jesu süss, wer dein gedenkt (super Lilia convallium, Alexandri Grandis), 2 S, 2 T, 2 vn, bc
- SWV 407 – Lasset uns doch den Herren, unsern Gott, loben, 2 S, T, B, 2 vn, compl. 4vv and insts ad lib, bc
- SWV 408 – Es ging ein Sämann aus zu säen, S, A, T, B, 2 vn, bn, compl. 4vv and insts ad lib, bc
- SWV 409 – Seid barmherzig, S, A, T, B, 2 vn, bn (+ B), compl. 4vv and insts ad lib, bc
- SWV 410 – Siehe, dieser wird gesetzt zu einem Fall, 2 S, A, T, B, 2 vn, bc
- SWV 411 – Vater unser, der du bist im Himmel, S, Mez, 2 T, B, 2 vn, compl. 4vv and insts ad lib, bc
- SWV 412 – Siehe, wie fein und lieblich ist, 2 S, A, T, B, 2 vn, bn, compl. 2 insts ad lib, bc
- SWV 413 – Hütet euch, dass eure Herzen, 2 S, A, 2 T, B, 2 vn, bc
- SWV 414 – Meister, wir wissen, dass du wahrhaftig bist, 2 S, A, T, B, 2 vn, bn, compl. 4vv and insts ad lib, bc
- SWV 415 – Saul, Saul, was verfolgst du mich, 2 S, A, T, 2 B, 2 vn, 2 cap. S, A, T, B ad lib, bc
- SWV 416 – Herr, wie lang willt du mein so gar vergessen, 2 S, A, 2 T, B, 2 vn, compl. 4 viole ad lib, bc
- SWV 417 – Komm, heiliger Geist, S, Mez, 2 T, Bar, B, 2 vn, 2 cap. S, A, T, B ad lib, bc
- SWV 418 – Nun danket alle Gott, 2 S, A, 2 T, B, 2 vn, compl. 4vv and insts ad lib, bc

=== Trauerlied ===
Dresden (1652)

- SWV 419 – O meine Seel, warum bist du betrübet (Trauer-Lied), S, A, T, B, on death of Anna Margaretha Brehme, wife of the court librarian, Dresden, 21 Sept 1652

=== Zwölf geistliche Gesänge ===
Opus 13: Dresden (1657)

- SWV 420 – Kyrie, Gott Vater in Ewigkeit (super Missam Fons bonitatis), S, A, T, B, bc
- SWV 421 – All Ehr und Lob soll Gottes sein (Das teutsche Gloria in excelsis), S, A, T, B, bc
- SWV 422 – Ich gläube an einen einigen Gott (Der nicänische Glaube), S, A, T, B, bc
- SWV 423 – Unser Herr Jesus Christus, in der Nacht (Die Wort der Einsetzung des heiligen Abendmahls), 2 S, A, B, bc
- SWV 424 – Ich danke dem Herrn von ganzem Herzen (Der 111. Psalm), 2 S, A, B, bc
- SWV 425 – Danksagen wir alle Gott, 2 S, A, T, bc
- SWV 426 – Meine Seele erhebt den Herren (Magnificat), S, A, T, B, bc
- SWV 427 – O süsser Jesu Christ (Des H. Bernhardi Freudengesang), 2 S, A, B; I: 2 S, A, B; II: 2 S, A, B; bc
- SWV 428 – Kyrie eleison, Christe eleison (Die teutsche gemeine Litaney), S, A, T, B, bc
- SWV 429 – Aller Augen warten auf dich (Das Benedicite vor dem Essen), S, A, T, B, bc
- SWV 430 – Danket dem Herren, denn er ist freundlich (Das Gratias nach dem Essen), S, A, T, B, bc
- SWV 431 – Christe fac ut sapiam (Hymnus pro vera sapientia), S, A, T, B; I: S, A, T, B; II: S, A, T, B; bc

=== Ceremonial works ===
- SWV 432 – 433 – Herr, nun lässest du deinen Diener, Canticum B. Simeonis … nach dem hochseligsten Hintritt … Johann Georgen (Dresden, 1657), on the death of John George I, Elector of Saxony, Dresden, 8 Oct 1657
- SWV 434 – Wie wenn der Adler sich aus seiner Klippe schwingt, S, bc, on the engagement of Princess Magdalena Sibylla of Saxony and Frederick William II, Duke of Saxe-Altenburg, Dresden, 1651

=== Weihnachtshistorie ===
Dresden (1664)

- SWV 435 – Christmas Story: "Die Geburt unsers Herren Jesu Christi, Historia, der freuden- und gnadenreichen Geburt Gottes und Marien Sohnes, Jesu Christi".

=== Miscellaneous works ===
- SWV 436 – Ego autem sum, [B], bc
- SWV 437 – Veni, Domine, [S], bc
- SWV 438 – Die Erde trinkt für sich (Madrigal) (Optiz), A, T, bc
- SWV 439 – Heute ist Christus der Herr geboren, 3 S, bc
- SWV 440 – Güldne Haare, gleich Aurore (Canzonetta), 2 S, 2 vn
- SWV 441 – Liebster, sagt in süssem Schmerzen (Opitz), 2 S, 2 vn, bc
- SWV 442 – Tugend ist der beste Freund (Opitz), 2 S, 2 vn, bc,
- SWV 443 – Weib, was weinest du (Dialogo per la pascua), 2 S, A, T, bc
- SWV 444 – Es gingen zweene Menschen hinauf (in dialogo), 2 S, A, Bar, bc
- SWV 445 – Ach bleib mit deiner Gnade, doub.
- SWV 446 – In dich hab ich gehoffet, Herr, doub.
- SWV 447 – Erbarm dich mein, o Herre Gott, S, 2 viole/vn, 2 viole, vle, bc
- SWV 448 – Gelobet seist du, Herr (Gesang der dreyer Menner im feurig Ofen), 2 S, A, T, B, 2 cornettinos ad lib, 3 trombones ad lib, [cap. 2 S, A, T, B ad lib], cap. 2 vn, 2 viole, vle ad lib, bc
- SWV 449 – Herr, unser Herrscher (Psalmus 8), 2 S, A, T, B (+ cap. ad lib), cornettino/vn ad lib, vn/cornett ad lib, 4 trombones ad lib, bc (org, vle)
- SWV 450 – Ach Herr, du Schöpfer aller Ding (Madrigale spirituale), S, A, 2 T, B, bc
- SWV 451 – Nachdem ich lag in meinem öden Bette (Opitz), S, B, 2 vn, 2 insts, bc
- SWV 452 – Lässt Salomon sein Bette nicht umgeben (Opitz), S, B, 2 vn, 2 insts, bc
- SWV 453 – Freue dich des Weibes deiner Jugend, S, A, T, B (+ tutti [ad lib]), tpt, cornett, 3 trombones ad lib, bc
- SWV 454 – Nun lasst uns Gott dem Herren, doub.
- SWV 455 – Die Himmel erzählen die Ehre Gottes (Psalmus 19), 2 S, A, 2 T, B (+ cap. ad lib), bc
- SWV 456 – Hodie Christus natus est, 2 S, A, 2 T, B, bc
- SWV 457 – Ich weiss, dass mein Erlöser lebet, 2 S, A, 2 T, B
- SWV 458 – Kyrie eleison, Christe eleison (Litania), 2 S, A, 2 T, B, bc
- SWV 459 – Saget den Gästen, S, A, T, B, 2 vn, bn, bc
- SWV 460 – Itzt blicken durch des Himmels Saal (Madrigal) (Opitz), 2 S, A, T, B, 2 vn, bc
- SWV 461 – Herr, der du bist vormals genädig gewest, 2 S, 2 T, B, 2 vn, 3 trombones ad lib, cap. S, A, T, B ad lib, bc
- SWV 462 – Auf dich, Herr, traue ich (Psalmus 7), I: S, A, T, B; II: S, A, T, B; coro aggiunto (2 vn, viola cornett, 3 trombones), ad lib, bc
- SWV 463 – Cantate Domino canticum novum, Coro I: S, A, T, B; Coro II: S, A, T, B, bc
- SWV 464 – Ich bin die Auferstehung, Coro I: S, A, T, B; Coro II: S, A, T, B – on the death of Anton Colander, before 1620
- SWV 465 – Da pacem Domine, Coro I: 5 viole + 1/2vv; Coro II: S, A, T, B, bc
- SWV 466 – Herr, wer wird wohnen in deiner Hütten (Psalmus 15), Coro I: A, B, 2 vn, vle; Coro II: S, T, 3 trombones, bc
- SWV 467 – Wo Gott der Herr nicht bei uns hält, Coro I: S, lutes; Coro II: S, 3 viols; Coro III: S, 3 trombones, bc, on the hymn "Wo Gott der Herr nicht bei uns hält"
- SWV 468 – Magnificat anima mea, S, A, T, B, 2 vn, 3 trombones, 2 cap. S, A, T, B ad lib, bc
- SWV 469 – Surrexit pastor bonus, 2 S, A, 2 T, B, 2 vn, 3 trombones, 2 cap. S, A, T, B ad lib, bc
- SWV 470 – Christ ist erstanden, S, A, T, 4 viole, 4 trombones, bc
- SWV 471 – O bone Jesu, fili Mariae, 2 S, 2 A, T, B (+ rip. ad lib), 2 vn/viole, 4 viole, bc
- SWV 472 – * "Herr Gott, dich loben wir", doub.
- SWV 473 – Wo der Herr nicht das Haus bauet (Psalmus 127), Coro I: 2 S, A, T, B, 2 vn, 3 trombones; Coro II (cap.): S, A, T, B; bc
- SWV 474 – Ach wie soll ich doch in Freuden leben, Coro I: S, lutes; Coro II: S, 3 viole; Coro III: S, 3 trombones; cap. A, T, B, vn, cornett, bc
- SWV 475 – Veni, Sancte Spiritus, Coro I: 2 S, bn; Coro II: B, 2 cornetts; Coro III: 2 T, 3 trombones; Coro IV: A, T, vn, fl, vle; bc
- SWV 476 – Domini est terra, Coro I: S, A, T, B (+ tutti ad lib); Coro II: S, A, T, B (+ tutti ad lib); 2 cornetti, 5 bn, 2 vn, 4 trombones; bc
- SWV 477 – Vater Abraham, erbarme dich mein (Dialogus divites Epulonis cum Abrahamo), 2 S, A, T, B, 2 vn (alternating with 2 fl), vle, bc
- SWV 478 – Die sieben Wortte unsers lieben Erlösers und Seeligmachers Jesu Christi, Da Jesus an dem Kreuze stund, S, A, 2 T, B (+ cap. ad lib),5 insts, bc

=== Passions ===
- SWV 479 – Historia des Leidens und Sterbens unsers Herrn und Heylandes Jesu Christi nach dem Evangelisten S. Matheum, 1666, Das Leiden unsers Herren Jesu Christi, wie es beschreibet der heilige Evangeliste Matthaeus, 2 S, A, 3 T, 2 B, chorus 4vv
- SWV 480 – Historia des Leidens und Sterbens … Jesu Christi nach dem Evangelisten St. Lucam, Das Leiden unsers Herren Jesu Christi, wie uns das beschreibet der heilige Evangeliste Lucas, S, A, 3 T, 2 B, chorus 4vv
- SWV 481 – Historia des Leidens und Sterbens … Jesu Christi nach dem Evangelisten St. Johannem, Das Leiden unsers Herren Jesu Christi, wie uns das beschreibet der heilige Evangeliste Johannes, S, 3 T, 2 B, chorus 4vv

=== Schwanengesang ===
Opus 13 (1671, Dresden) – Opus Ultimum – Schwanengesang

- SWV 482 – Wohl denen, die ohne Wandel leben – Psalm 119 – Aleph & Beth
- SWV 483 – Tue wohl deinem Knechte, dass ich lebe – Psalm 119 – Gimel & Daleth
- SWV 484 – Zeige mir, Herr, den Weg deiner Rechte – Psalm 119 – He & Vav
- SWV 485 – Gedenke deinem Knechte an dein Wort – Psalm 119 – Dsaïn & Vhet
- SWV 486 – Du trust Guts deinem Knechte – Psalm 119 – Thet & Jod
- SWV 487 – Meine Seele verlanget nach deinem Heil – Psalm 119 – Caph & Lamed
- SWV 488 – Wie habe ich deine Gesetze so lieb – Psalm 119 – Mem & Nun
- SWV 489 – Ich hasse die Flattergeister – Psalm 119 – Samech & Ain
- SWV 490 – Deine Zeugnisse sind wunderbarlich – Pe & Zade
- SWV 491 – Ich rufe von ganzem Herzen – Koph & Resch
- SWV 492 – Die Fürsten verfolgen mich ohn Ursach – Schin & Tav
- SWV 493 – Jauchzet dem Herren, alle Welt – Psalm 100
- SWV 494 – Meine Seele erhebt den Herren (Deutsches Magnificat)

=== Other works ===
- SWV 495 – Unser Herr Jesus Christus, in der Nacht, I: S, A, T, B; II: S, A, T, B
- SWV 496 – Esaja, dem Propheten, das geschah, B, 8vv,2 cornetts (alternating with 2 rec), 7vv, bc
- SWV 497 – Ein Kind ist uns geboren, 2 T, bc
- SWV 498 – Stehe auf; meine Freundin, I: S, A, T, B; II: S, A, T, B
- SWV 499 – Tulerunt Dominum meum, et nescio ubi posuerunt eum, (Mary Magdalene) 4 tpt, 20 parts, bc
- SWV 500 – An den Wassern zu Babel (Psalm 137), I: T, 4 trombones; II: 2 S, B; bc
- SWV 501 – Mit dem Amphion zwar mein Orgel und mein Harfe (Klag-Lied), T, bc, on death of Magdalena Schütz, Dresden, 6 Sept 1625;

=== Uncatalogued works ===
- A1 – Vier Hirtinnen, gleich jung, gleich schon, 2 S, A, T, bc
- A2 – Ach Herr, du Sohn David, doub.
- A3 – Der Gott Abraham, doub.
- A4 – Stehe auf, meine Freundin, doub.
- A5 – Benedicam Dominum in omni tempore, doub.
- A6 – Freuet euch mit mir, doub.
- A7 – Herr, höre mein Wort, doub.
- A8 – Machet die Tore weit, doub.
- A9 – Sumite psalmum, doub.
- A10 – Dominus illuminatio mea, doub.
- A11 – Es erhub sich ein Streit, doub.

=== Lost works ===
- Dafne (Torgau, 1627) – the first German opera, where Schütz put music to a German adaptation (by Martin Opitz) of the original opera by Ottavio Rinuccini.
- Orpheus und Eurydike (Dresden, 1638) – a ballet based on the myth about Orpheus and Eurydice, with libretto by August Buchner.
- Paris und Helena five-act Sing-Ballet to a libretto by David Schirmer. For the double wedding in Dresden of the brothers Maurice, Duke of Saxe-Zeitz and Christian I, Duke of Saxe-Merseburg.
