= Matteo Messori =

Italian musician (born 1976)

- Born: 23 April 1976 (age 49); Bologna, Italy
- Occupations: Classical keyboard player; conductor
- Website: www.matteomessori.com

Matteo Messori (born 23 April 1976) is an Italian keyboard player, conductor, musicologist, composer and teacher. He performs on period instruments including the harpsichord, pipe organ, clavichord and pedal piano. He founded the early music ensemble Cappella Augustana.

== Biography ==
Messori was born in Bologna where he initially studied piano under the Arturo Benedetti Michelangeli's pupil Franca Fogli and later organ and counterpoint with Umberto Pineschi, graduating cum laude. He studied harpsichord with Sergio Vartolo at the conservatories of Mantua and Venice, graduating again cum laude. He studied also musicology at the University of Bologna.

From 1990 he started to work as a continuo player with the ensemble "I Filomusi". At the same time he undertook a soloist career in Europe and America. In 1998 he won the First Prize at the National Harpsichord Competition "Gianni Gambi" in Pesaro. He won also other prizes, including the Medaglia Campiani in Mantua.

In 2000 he founded an early music ensemble Cappella Augustana with which he is recording the complete works by Heinrich Schütz for the Dutch label Brilliant Classics. Messori's extensive discography includes also several works by Johann Sebastian Bach: the third part of Clavierübung, the Schübler Chorales, 8 Preludes and Fugues, the Canonical Variations, Die Kunst der Fuge and Ein musikalisches Opfer (with his ensemble Cappella Augustana). He also recorded the first tribute to the sacred music composed by Vincenzo Albrici, who was Kapellmeister in Dresden and organist at the Thomaskirche in Leipzig,

Besides his work with the ensemble Cappella Augustana, he is in frequent demand as organist, harpsichordist and guest conductor.

In 2010 his study on the 16' harpsichord with pedal harpsichord built by Zacharias Hildebrandt for the Collegium Musicum in Leipzig was published in the Bach-Jahrbuch.

He teaches organ and organ composition at the Venice Conservatory and harpsichord at the Bergamo Conservatory.

In November 2011 the German magazine FonoForum wrote: "The complete recording of Bach's late works is a statement with which the still young Italian harpsichordist and organist has come to play in the Champions League of the international Bach interpreters".

He has composed and published choral works, songs for voice and piano, chamber music and solo keyboard pieces, written several musicological articles and edited critical editions.

== Selected discography ==
- "Johann Sebastian Bach - Schübler Chorales, 8 Preludes and Fugues" 2 CDs (Brilliant Classics, 94380). 2011
- "Johann Sebastian Bach - Die Kunst der Fuge, Musikalisches Opfer, Einige canonische Veraenderungen" 3CDs (Brilliant Classics, 94061). 2010
- "Johann Sebastian Bach - Dritter Theil der Clavierübung" 2 SuperAudio CDs (Brilliant Classics, 92769). 2008
- "Heinrich Schütz Edition Vol. 4" 5 CDs (Brilliant Classics, 93972). With Cappella Augustana. 2008
- "Heinrich Schütz Edition Vol. 3" 4 CDs (Brilliant Classics, 92795). With Cappella Augustana. 2005
- "Heinrich Schütz Edition Vol. 2" 5 CDs (Brilliant Classics, 92440). With Cappella Augustana. 2004
- "Heinrich Schütz Edition Vol. 1" 5 CDs (Brilliant Classics, 92196). With Cappella Augustana. 2003
- "Heinrich Schütz - Symphoniae sacrae" SuperAudio CD (Brilliant Classics, 92196). With Cappella Augustana. 2004
- "Vincenzo Albrici - Concerti sacri" (Mvsica Rediviva, MRCD008). With Cappella Augustana. 2002
- "Love - Simone Kermes" (Sony International). With La Magnifica Comunità as continuo player, arranger and composer.
