= Psalm 28 =

Biblical psalm

- "Unto thee will I cry, O LORD my rock"
- Other name: "Exaudi vocem deprecationis meae"
- Language: Hebrew (original)

Psalm 28
- ← Psalm 27 Psalm 29 →
- Book: Book of Psalms
- Hebrew Bible part: Ketuvim
- Order in the Hebrew part: 1
- Category: Sifrei Emet
- Christian Bible part: Old Testament
- Order in the Christian part: 19

Psalm 28 is the 28th psalm of the Book of Psalms, beginning in English in the King James Version: "Unto thee will I cry, O LORD my rock;". The Book of Psalms is part of the third section of the Hebrew Bible, and a book of the Christian Old Testament. In the slightly different numbering system used in the Greek Septuagint and Latin Vulgate translations of the Bible, this psalm is Psalm 27. In Latin, it is known by the incipit, "Exaudi vocem deprecationis meae".

Psalm 28 is used in both Jewish and Christian liturgies. It has often been set to music.

== Interpretation ==
Charles and Emilie Briggs describe the psalm as

a prayer: (1) expostulating with Yahweh for abandoning His people in peril of death, and crying aloud for help, with hands uplifted towards the holy shrine (v.^{1-2}); (2) urging that He discriminate between them and their enemies, visiting the latter with retribution for their deeds (v.^{3-4}); (3) blessing Yahweh, the strength and shield, and rejoicing in Him as the refuge for king and people (v.^{6-8})."

The Briggs suggest that it is to be dated to the reign of King Jehoiakim in "the late Babylonian period shortly before the exile", which occurred in 587 or 586 BCE. They identify verses 5 and 9 as glosses which "give a reason for the imprecation upon enemies (verse 5) and a liturgical petition for salvation (verse 9)".

=== Verse 5 ===
Because they regard not the works of the Lord, nor the operation of his hands.

In Psalm 28:5 is, according to Charles Spurgeon's exegesis, an example of general revelation: with God's hand clearly seen in nature and history. God works in creation: nature teems with proofs of his wisdom and goodness, yet atheists refuse to see him: he works in providence, ruling and overruling, and his hand is manifest in human history.

=== Verse 8 ===
The LORD is their strength, and he is the saving strength of his anointed.

The Jerusalem Bible suggests that the word "anointed" here refers to the people of God consecrated to his service, and not the king or the high priest.

== Uses ==
=== Judaism ===
- Verse 9 is the first verse of the paragraph Hoshia Et Amecha of Pesukei Dezimra. This verse, because of its 10 words, is often used for counting for the ten people needed for a minyan, as Jewish law forbids the numerical counting of people.

=== Book of Common Prayer ===
In the Church of England's Book of Common Prayer, this psalm is appointed to be read on the evening of the fifth day of the month.

== Musical settings ==
A setting of Psalm 28 in English, "Thou art, O Lord, my strength and stay", by John Bennet was published in Richard Langdon's Divine Harmony in 1774. Heinrich Schütz wrote a setting of a paraphrase of the psalm in German, "Ich ruf zu dir, Herr Gott, mein Hort", SWV 125, for the Becker Psalter, published first in 1628. Felix Mendelssohn used verse 1 of Psalm 28 for a recitative in his oratorio Elijah, first performed in 1846. Alan Hovhaness set verses 1, 2, and 9 for his choir and organ work Unto Thee Will I Cry, op. 162.

== Text ==
The following table shows the Hebrew text of the Psalm with vowels, alongside the Koine Greek text in the Septuagint and the English translation from the King James Version. Note that the meaning can slightly differ between these versions, as the Septuagint and the Masoretic Text come from different textual traditions. (Note: A 1917 translation directly from Hebrew to English by the Jewish Publication Society can be found here or here, and an 1844 translation directly from the Septuagint by L. C. L. Brenton can be found here. Both translations are in the public domain.) In the Septuagint, this psalm is numbered Psalm 27.

#	Hebrew	English	Greek
1	לְדָוִ֡ד אֵ֘לֶ֤יךָ יְהֹוָ֨ה ׀ אֶקְרָ֗א צוּרִי֮ אַֽל־תֶּחֱרַ֢שׁ מִ֫מֶּ֥נִּי פֶּן־תֶּחֱשֶׁ֥ה מִמֶּ֑נִּי וְ֝נִמְשַׁ֗לְתִּי עִם־י֥וֹרְדֵי בֽוֹר׃	(A Psalm of David.) Unto thee will I cry, O LORD my rock; be not silent to me: lest, if thou be silent to me, I become like them that go down into the pit.	Τοῦ Δαυΐδ. - ΠΡΟΣ σέ, Κύριε, ἐκέκραξα, ὁ Θεός μου, μὴ παρασιωπήσῃς ἀπ᾿ ἐμοῦ, μήποτε παρασιωπήσῃς ἀπ᾿ ἐμοῦ καὶ ὁμοιωθήσομαι τοῖς καταβαίνουσιν εἰς λάκκον.
2	שְׁמַ֤ע ק֣וֹל תַּ֭חֲנוּנַי בְּשַׁוְּעִ֣י אֵלֶ֑יךָ בְּנׇשְׂאִ֥י יָ֝דַ֗י אֶל־דְּבִ֥יר קׇדְשֶֽׁךָ׃	Hear the voice of my supplications, when I cry unto thee, when I lift up my hands toward thy holy oracle.	εἰσάκουσον τῆς φωνῆς τῆς δεήσεώς μου ἐν τῷ δέεσθαί με πρὸς σέ, ἐν τῷ αἴρειν με χεῖράς μου πρὸς ναὸν ἅγιόν σου.
3	אַל־תִּמְשְׁכֵ֣נִי עִם־רְשָׁעִים֮ וְעִם־פֹּ֢עֲלֵ֫י אָ֥וֶן דֹּבְרֵ֣י שָׁ֭לוֹם עִם־רֵעֵיהֶ֑ם וְ֝רָעָ֗ה בִּלְבָבָֽם׃	Draw me not away with the wicked, and with the workers of iniquity, which speak peace to their neighbours, but mischief is in their hearts.	μὴ συνελκύσῃς μετὰ ἁμαρτωλῶν τὴν ψυχήν μου καὶ μετὰ ἐργαζομένων ἀδικίαν μὴ συναπολέσῃς με τῶν λαλούντων εἰρήνην μετὰ τῶν πλησίον αὐτῶν, κακὰ δὲ ἐν ταῖς καρδίαις αὐτῶν.
4	תֶּן־לָהֶ֣ם כְּפׇעֳלָם֮ וּכְרֹ֢עַ מַעַלְלֵ֫יהֶ֥ם כְּמַעֲשֵׂ֣ה יְ֭דֵיהֶם תֵּ֣ן לָהֶ֑ם הָשֵׁ֖ב גְּמוּלָ֣ם לָהֶֽם׃	Give them according to their deeds, and according to the wickedness of their endeavours: give them after the work of their hands; render to them their desert.	δὸς αὐτοῖς, Κύριε, κατὰ τὰ ἔργα αὐτῶν καὶ κατὰ τὴν πονηρίαν τῶν ἐπιτηδευμάτων αὐτῶν· κατὰ τὰ ἔργα τῶν χειρῶν αὐτῶν δὸς αὐτοῖς, ἀπόδος τὸ ἀνταπόδομα αὐτῶν αὐτοῖς.
5	כִּ֤י לֹ֪א יָבִ֡ינוּ אֶל־פְּעֻלֹּ֣ת יְ֭הֹוָה וְאֶל־מַעֲשֵׂ֣ה יָדָ֑יו יֶ֝הֶרְסֵ֗ם וְלֹ֣א יִבְנֵֽם׃	Because they regard not the works of the LORD, nor the operation of his hands, he shall destroy them, and not build them up.	ὅτι οὐ συνῆκαν εἰς τὰ ἔργα Κυρίου καὶ εἰς τὰ ἔργα τῶν χειρῶν αὐτοῦ· καθελεῖς αὐτοὺς καὶ οὐ μὴ οἰκοδομήσεις αὐτούς.
6	בָּר֥וּךְ יְהֹוָ֑ה כִּי־שָׁ֝מַ֗ע ק֣וֹל תַּחֲנוּנָֽי׃	Blessed be the LORD, because he hath heard the voice of my supplications.	εὐλογητὸς Κύριος, ὅτι εἰσήκουσε τῆς φωνῆς τῆς δεήσεώς μου.
7	יְהֹוָ֤ה ׀ עֻזִּ֥י וּמָגִנִּי֮ בּ֤וֹ בָטַ֥ח לִבִּ֗י וְֽנֶ֫עֱזָ֥רְתִּי וַיַּעֲלֹ֥ז לִבִּ֑י וּֽמִשִּׁירִ֥י אֲהוֹדֶֽנּוּ׃	The LORD is my strength and my shield; my heart trusted in him, and I am helped: therefore my heart greatly rejoiceth; and with my song will I praise him.	Κύριος βοηθός μου καὶ ὑπερασπιστής μου· ἐπ᾿ αὐτῷ ἤλπισεν ἡ καρδία μου, καὶ ἐβοηθήθην, καὶ ἀνέθαλεν ἡ σάρξ μου· καὶ ἐκ θελήματός μου ἐξομολογήσομαι αὐτῷ.
8	יְהֹוָ֥ה עֹֽז־לָ֑מוֹ וּמָ֘ע֤וֹז יְשׁוּע֖וֹת מְשִׁיח֣וֹ הֽוּא׃	The LORD is their strength, and he is the saving strength of his anointed.	Κύριος κραταίωμα τοῦ λαοῦ αὐτοῦ καὶ ὑπερασπιστὴς τῶν σωτηρίων τοῦ χριστοῦ αὐτοῦ ἐστι.
9	הוֹשִׁ֤יעָה ׀ אֶת־עַמֶּ֗ךָ וּבָרֵ֥ךְ אֶת־נַחֲלָתֶ֑ךָ וּֽרְעֵ֥ם וְ֝נַשְּׂאֵ֗ם עַד־הָעוֹלָֽם׃	Save thy people, and bless thine inheritance: feed them also, and lift them up for ever.	σῶσον τὸν λαόν σου καὶ εὐλόγησον τὴν κληρονομίαν σου καὶ ποίμανον αὐτοὺς καὶ ἔπαρον αὐτοὺς ἕως τοῦ αἰῶνος.
