= Psalm 29 =

Biblical psalm

- "Give unto the LORD, O ye mighty"
- Hymn psalm
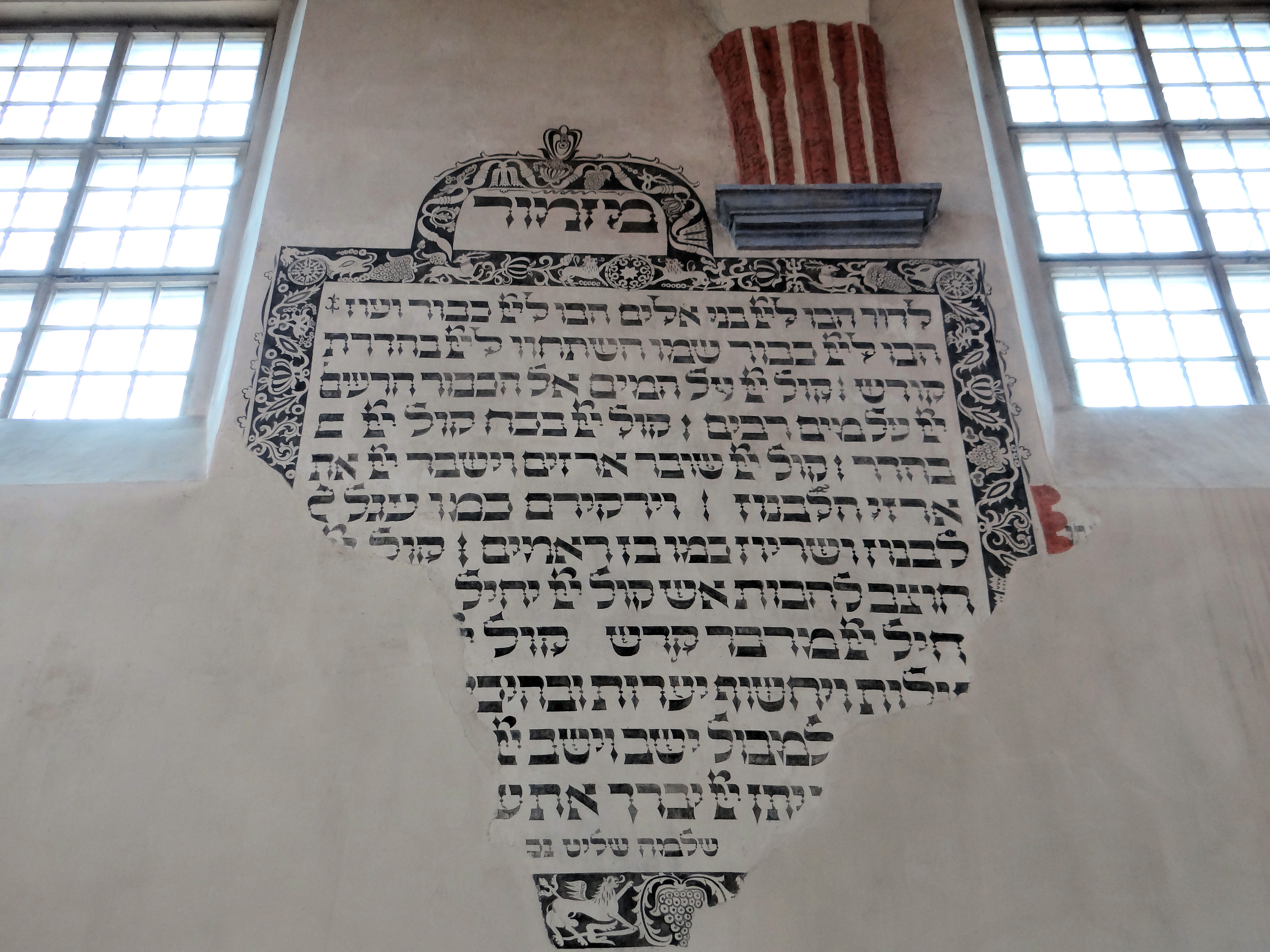
- Interior of the Tykocin Synagogue, 2013
- Other name: Psalm 28 (Vulgate); "Adferte Domino filii Dei"
- Language: Hebrew (original)

Psalm 29
- ← Psalm 28 Psalm 30 →
- Book: Book of Psalms
- Hebrew Bible part: Ketuvim
- Order in the Hebrew part: 1
- Category: Sifrei Emet
- Christian Bible part: Old Testament
- Order in the Christian part: 19

Psalm 29 is the 29th psalm of the Book of Psalms, beginning in English in the King James Version: "Give unto the LORD, O ye mighty, give unto the LORD glory and strength". The Book of Psalms is part of the third section of the Hebrew Bible, and a book of the Christian Old Testament. In the slightly different numbering system used in the Greek Septuagint and Latin Vulgate translations of the Bible, this psalm is Psalm 28. In Latin, it is known as "Adferte Domino filii Dei". The psalm attributes itself to David. It is a hymn, describing the advent of Yahweh in a storm.

The psalm forms a regular part of Jewish, Catholic, Lutheran, Anglican and Nonconformist Protestant liturgies.

== Origin ==
Psalm 29 is an example of an enthronement psalm wherein the supreme deity is described in theophanic terminology as taking his place of rulership. In the 19th and early 20th centuries, scholars like Charles and Emilie Grace Briggs argued that it "seems to belong to the Persian period subsequent to Nehemiah", that is, between 445 and 333 BCE.

However, more recent scholarship has undermined this conclusion; archaic language and content have been identified in the Psalm, akin to other early strata such as the Song of the Sea, befitting an early pre-exilic context. Cross opines that generations of scholars have firmly identified literary dependence on Canaanite mythology, particularly the Baal Cycle, and concludes on this basis that its present form is "no later than the 10th century BC." Similarly, Freedman cites "considerable scholarly sentiment" supporting a pre-monarchic provenance, and suggests that Psalm 29 may be dated as early the 12th century BCE, making it among the oldest portions of literature in the Hebrew Bible.

== Theme ==
[Psalm] 29 is a hymn, describing the advent of Yahweh in a storm. (1) The angels worship Yahweh in the heavenly temple (v.^{1-2}); (2) the thunder of Yahweh's voice is a great power (a) on the waters (v.^{3-4}); (b) upon Lebanon and its cedars (v.^{5-6}); (c) upon the wilderness and its forests (v.^{8-9}); (3) Yahweh, enthroned over the Flood, reigns forever and bestows blessings on his people (v.^{10-11}).

—

== Uses ==
=== Judaism ===
- Is the recited during Kabbalat Shabbat; in Ashkenazic, Hasidic and some Sephardic communities. In other Sephardic communities, Kabbalat Shabbat begins with this Psalm.
- Is recited on Shabbat during the Torah service as when returning the Torah Scroll to the ark.
- Is recited in some congregations before Maariv on Motzei Shabbat.
- Is recited on the third day of Sukkot in some traditions.
- Is recited on Shavuot in some traditions.
- Verse 11 is part of Talmud Berachos 64a. It is the final verse of Birkat Hamazon, is recited during the prayers following Motzei Shabbat Maariv, and is recited when opening the Hakafot on Simchat Torah.
- In some communities, it is recited at the end of weekday maariv (along with Psalms 24 and 8) when maariv is recited after nightfall.

=== Coptic Orthodox Church ===
In the Agpeya, the Coptic Church's book of hours, this psalm is prayed in the office of Terce.

=== Book of Common Prayer ===
In the Church of England's Book of Common Prayer, this psalm is appointed to be read on the evening of the fifth day of the month.

== Musical settings ==
Heinrich Schütz wrote a setting of a metric paraphrase of Psalm 28 in German, "Ich ruf zu dir, Herr Gott, mein Hort", SWV 125, for the Becker Psalter, first published in 1628.

== Text ==
The following table shows the Hebrew text of the Psalm with vowels, alongside the Koine Greek text in the Septuagint and the English translation from the King James Version. Note that the meaning can slightly differ between these versions, as the Septuagint and the Masoretic Text come from different textual traditions. (Note: A 1917 translation directly from Hebrew to English by the Jewish Publication Society can be found here or here, and an 1844 translation directly from the Septuagint by L. C. L. Brenton can be found here. Both translations are in the public domain.) In the Septuagint, this psalm is numbered Psalm 28.

#	Hebrew	English	Greek
1	מִזְמ֗וֹר לְדָ֫וִ֥ד הָב֣וּ לַ֭יהֹוָה בְּנֵ֣י אֵלִ֑ים הָב֥וּ לַ֝יהֹוָ֗ה כָּב֥וֹד וָעֹֽז׃	(A Psalm of David.) Give unto the LORD, O ye mighty, give unto the LORD glory and strength.	Ψαλμὸς τῷ Δαυΐδ· ἐξοδίου σκηνῆς. - ΕΝΕΓΚΑΤΕ τῷ Κυρίῳ, υἱοὶ Θεοῦ, ἐνέγκατε τῷ Κυρίῳ υἱοὺς κριῶν, ἐνέγκατε τῷ Κυρίῳ δόξαν καὶ τιμήν,
2	הָב֣וּ לַ֭יהֹוָה כְּב֣וֹד שְׁמ֑וֹ הִשְׁתַּחֲו֥וּ לַ֝יהֹוָ֗ה בְּהַדְרַת־קֹֽדֶשׁ׃	Give unto the LORD the glory due unto his name; worship the LORD in the beauty of holiness.	ἐνέγκατε τῷ Κυρίῳ δόξαν ὀνόματι αὐτοῦ, προσκυνήσατε τῷ Κυρίῳ ἐν αὐλῇ ἁγίᾳ αὐτοῦ.
3	ק֥וֹל יְהֹוָ֗ה עַל־הַ֫מָּ֥יִם אֵֽל־הַכָּב֥וֹד הִרְעִ֑ים יְ֝הֹוָ֗ה עַל־מַ֥יִם רַבִּֽים׃	The voice of the LORD is upon the waters: the God of glory thundereth: the LORD is upon many waters.	φωνὴ Κυρίου ἐπὶ τῶν ὑδάτων, ὁ Θεὸς τῆς δόξης ἐβρόντησε, Κύριος ἐπὶ ὑδάτων πολλῶν.
4	קוֹל־יְהֹוָ֥ה בַּכֹּ֑חַ ק֥וֹל יְ֝הֹוָ֗ה בֶּהָדָֽר׃	The voice of the LORD is powerful; the voice of the LORD is full of majesty.	φωνὴ Κυρίου ἐν ἰσχύϊ, φωνὴ Κυρίου ἐν μεγαλοπρεπείᾳ.
5	ק֣וֹל יְ֭הֹוָה שֹׁבֵ֣ר אֲרָזִ֑ים וַיְשַׁבֵּ֥ר יְ֝הֹוָ֗ה אֶת־אַרְזֵ֥י הַלְּבָנֽוֹן׃	The voice of the LORD breaketh the cedars; yea, the LORD breaketh the cedars of Lebanon.	φωνὴ Κυρίου συντρίβοντος κέδρους, καὶ συντρίψει Κύριος τὰς κέδρους τοῦ Λιβάνου
6	וַיַּרְקִידֵ֥ם כְּמוֹ־עֵ֑גֶל לְבָנ֥וֹן וְ֝שִׂרְיֹ֗ן כְּמ֣וֹ בֶן־רְאֵמִֽים׃	He maketh them also to skip like a calf; Lebanon and Sirion like a young unicorn.	καὶ λεπτυνεῖ αὐτὰς ὡς τὸν μόσχον τὸν Λίβανον, καὶ ὁ ἠγαπημένος ὡς υἱὸς μονοκερώτων.
7	קוֹל־יְהֹוָ֥ה חֹצֵ֗ב לַהֲב֥וֹת אֵֽשׁ׃	The voice of the LORD divideth the flames of fire.	φωνὴ Κυρίου διακόπτοντος φλόγα πυρός,
8	ק֣וֹל יְ֭הֹוָה יָחִ֣יל מִדְבָּ֑ר יָחִ֥יל יְ֝הֹוָ֗ה מִדְבַּ֥ר קָדֵֽשׁ׃	The voice of the LORD shaketh the wilderness; the LORD shaketh the wilderness of Kadesh.	φωνὴ Κυρίου συσσείοντος ἔρημον καὶ συσσείσει Κύριος τὴν ἔρημον Κάδης.
9	ק֤וֹל יְהֹוָ֨ה ׀ יְחוֹלֵ֣ל אַיָּלוֹת֮ וַֽיֶּחֱשֹׂ֢ף יְעָ֫ר֥וֹת וּבְהֵיכָל֑וֹ כֻּ֝לּ֗וֹ אֹמֵ֥ר כָּבֽוֹד׃	The voice of the LORD maketh the hinds to calve, and discovereth the forests: and in his temple doth every one speak of his glory.	φωνὴ Κυρίου καταρτιζομένη ἐλάφους, καὶ ἀποκαλύψει δρυμούς· καὶ ἐν τῷ ναῷ αὐτοῦ πᾶς τις λέγει δόξαν.
10	יְ֭הֹוָה לַמַּבּ֣וּל יָשָׁ֑ב וַיֵּ֥שֶׁב יְ֝הֹוָ֗ה מֶ֣לֶךְ לְעוֹלָֽם׃	The LORD sitteth upon the flood; yea, the LORD sitteth King for ever.	Κύριος τὸν κατακλυσμὸν κατοικιεῖ, καὶ καθιεῖται Κύριος βασιλεὺς εἰς τὸν αἰῶνα.
11	יְֽהֹוָ֗ה עֹ֭ז לְעַמּ֣וֹ יִתֵּ֑ן יְהֹוָ֓ה ׀ יְבָרֵ֖ךְ אֶת־עַמּ֣וֹ בַשָּׁלֽוֹם׃	The LORD will give strength unto his people; the LORD will bless his people with peace.	Κύριος ἰσχὺν τῷ λαῷ αὐτοῦ δώσει, Κύριος εὐλογήσει τὸν λαὸν αὐτοῦ ἐν εἰρήνῃ.

=== Verse 2 ===
Give unto the Lord the glory due unto his name; worship the Lord in the beauty of holiness.

The same words as verse 2b, worship the Lord in the beauty of holiness, arise in Psalm 96:9. These words form the title of a hymn by Irish clergyman John Samuel Bewley Monsell. Alexander Kirkpatrick comments that

Suggestive as this rendering is, it can hardly be right; and the true sense is that given in [the] Revised Version margin, in holy array.
