= Psalm 26 =

Biblical psalm

- "Judge me, O LORD; for I have walked in mine integrity"
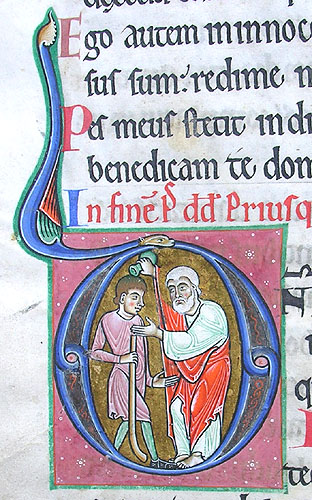
- Samuel anointing David, illumination of Psalm 26 from the Saint Bertin psalter
- Other name: Psalm 25 (Vulgate); "Iudica me Domine"
- Language: Hebrew (original)

Psalm 26
- ← Psalm 25 Psalm 27 →
- Book: Book of Psalms
- Hebrew Bible part: Ketuvim
- Order in the Hebrew part: 1
- Category: Sifrei Emet
- Christian Bible part: Old Testament
- Order in the Christian part: 19

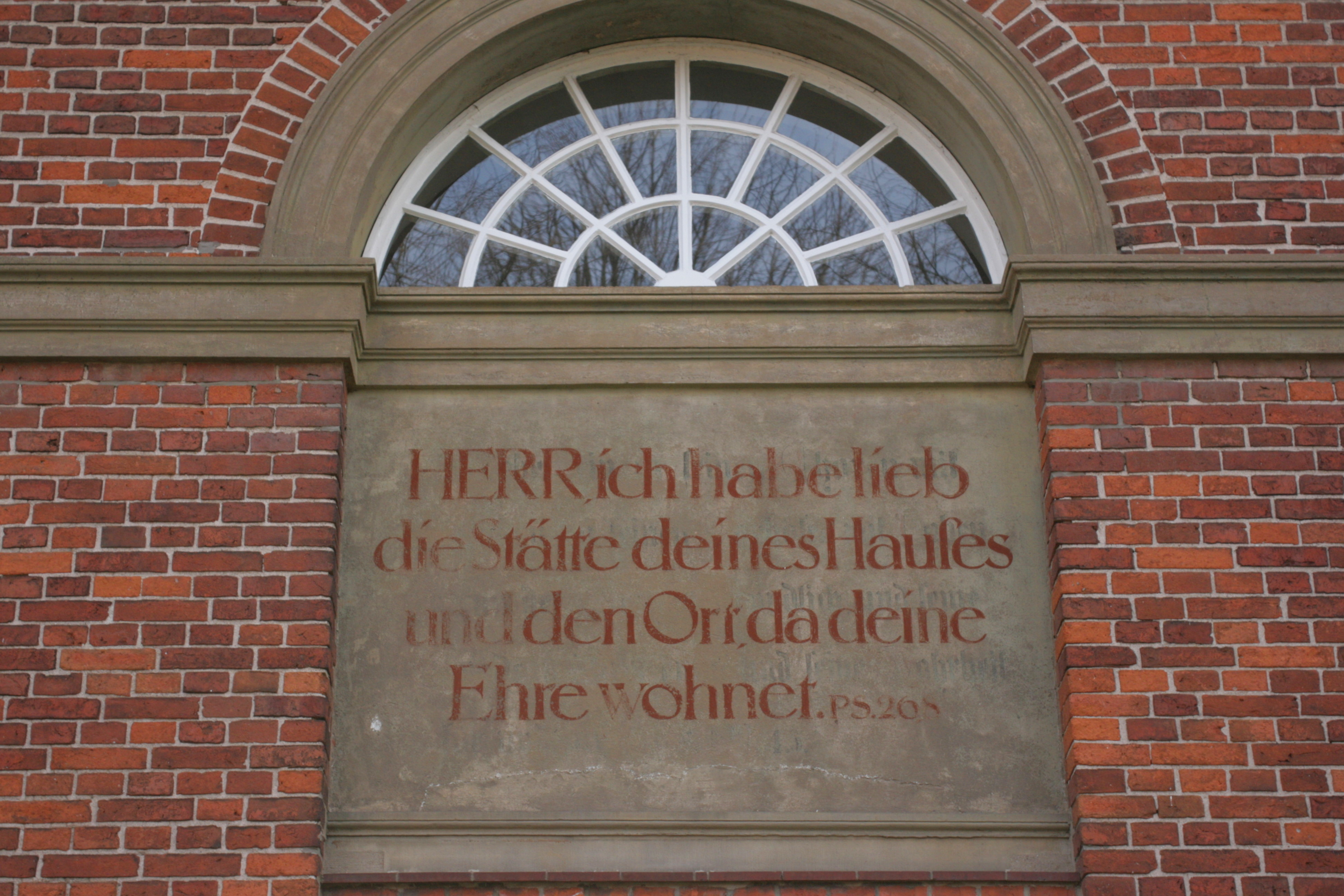
Text of Psalm 26:8 at St. Michael in Bienenbüttel

Psalm 26, the 26th psalm of the Book of Psalms in the Bible, begins (in the King James Version): "Judge me, O LORD; for I have walked in mine integrity".

The Book of Psalms is part of the third section of the Hebrew Bible, and a book of the Christian Old Testament. In the slightly different numbering system used in the Greek Septuagint and Latin Vulgate translations of the Bible, this psalm is Psalm 25. In Latin, it is known as "Iudica me Domine". The psalm is attributed to David by its sub-title. Albert Barnes argues that "there is no reason to doubt the correctness of the superscription", but according to Charles and Emilie Briggs, it is to be dated within the Persian period (539 to 333 BCE). The Briggs describe the psalm as

a profession of integrity by a Levite, engaged in worshipping Yahweh in the temple choir. (1) He professes integrity in walk, and unwavering trust in Yahweh, as attested by Yahweh Himself (v.^{1-2}). (2) Ever conscious of the divine kindness and faithfulness, he abstains from all association with the wicked (v.^{3-4}). (3) He hates the company of the wicked and purifies himself for sacrifice (v.^{5-6}). (4) He loves the temple (v.^{8}), and stands in its choir blessing Yahweh (v.^{12})

They add that the "elements of prayer and worship" in verses 9 to 11 are additions by a later editor.

The psalm forms a regular part of Jewish, Catholic, Lutheran, Anglican and Nonconformist Protestant liturgies.

== Structure ==
The psalm is divided into 2 parts

1. Verses 1-11: Pleas and affirmation of justice for the Psalmist
2. Verse 12: certainty of being heard and confident vows

The following observations can be made:

- The absence of a complaint. The peculiarity of the absence of an action falls on the Psalm: there is no reference to the wicked, which poses a risk for the psalmist in any way.
- The highlighting of the temple. The psalm refers not only to the "house of the Lord" (verse 8) and "Assembly" (verse 12), but also to the rites that are performed by the Psalmist in the Temple: the symbolic washing of hands, the circumambulation of the altar (verse 6) and the subsequent singing (verse 7).

== Text ==
The following table shows the Hebrew text of the Psalm with vowels, alongside the Koine Greek text in the Septuagint and the English translation from the King James Version. Note that the meaning can slightly differ between these versions, as the Septuagint and the Masoretic Text come from different textual traditions. (Note: A 1917 translation directly from Hebrew to English by the Jewish Publication Society can be found here or here, and an 1844 translation directly from the Septuagint by L. C. L. Brenton can be found here. Both translations are in the public domain.) In the Septuagint, this psalm is numbered Psalm 25.

#	Hebrew	English	Greek
1	לְדָוִ֨ד ׀ שׇׁפְטֵ֤נִי יְהֹוָ֗ה כִּֽי־אֲ֭נִי בְּתֻמִּ֣י הָלַ֑כְתִּי וּבַיהֹוָ֥ה בָּ֝טַ֗חְתִּי לֹ֣א אֶמְעָֽד׃	(A Psalm of David.) Judge me, O LORD; for I have walked in mine integrity: I have trusted also in the LORD; therefore I shall not slide.	Τοῦ Δαυΐδ. - ΚΡΙΝΟΝ με, Κύριε, ὅτι ἐγὼ ἐν ἀκακίᾳ μου ἐπορεύθην καὶ ἐπὶ τῷ Κυρίῳ ἐλπίζων, οὐ μὴ ἀσθενήσω.
2	בְּחָנֵ֣נִי יְהֹוָ֣ה וְנַסֵּ֑נִי (צרופה) [צׇרְפָ֖ה] כִלְיוֹתַ֣י וְלִבִּֽי׃	Examine me, O LORD, and prove me; try my reins and my heart.	δοκίμασόν με, Κύριε, καὶ πείρασόν με, πύρωσον τοὺς νεφρούς μου καὶ τὴν καρδίαν μου.
3	כִּֽי־חַ֭סְדְּךָ לְנֶ֣גֶד עֵינָ֑י וְ֝הִתְהַלַּ֗כְתִּי בַּאֲמִתֶּֽךָ׃	For thy lovingkindness is before mine eyes: and I have walked in thy truth.	ὅτι τὸ ἔλεός σου κατέναντι τῶν ὀφθαλμῶν μού ἐστι, καὶ εὐηρέστησα ἐν τῇ ἀληθείᾳ σου.
4	לֹֽא־יָ֭שַׁבְתִּי עִם־מְתֵי־שָׁ֑וְא וְעִ֥ם נַ֝עֲלָמִ֗ים לֹ֣א אָבֽוֹא׃	I have not sat with vain persons, neither will I go in with dissemblers.	οὐκ ἐκάθισα μετὰ συνεδρίου ματαιότητος καὶ μετὰ παρανομούντων οὐ μὴ εἰσέλθω·
5	שָׂ֭נֵאתִי קְהַ֣ל מְרֵעִ֑ים וְעִם־רְ֝שָׁעִ֗ים לֹ֣א אֵשֵֽׁב׃	I have hated the congregation of evil doers; and will not sit with the wicked.	ἐμίσησα ἐκκλησίαν πονηρευομένων καὶ μετὰ ἀσεβῶν οὐ μὴ καθίσω.
6	אֶרְחַ֣ץ בְּנִקָּי֣וֹן כַּפָּ֑י וַאֲסֹבְבָ֖ה אֶת־מִזְבַּחֲךָ֣ יְהֹוָֽה׃	I will wash mine hands in innocency: so will I compass thine altar, O LORD:	νίψομαι ἐν ἀθῴοις τὰς χεῖράς μου καὶ κυκλώσω τὸ θυσιαστήριόν σου, Κύριε,
7	לַ֭שְׁמִעַ בְּק֣וֹל תּוֹדָ֑ה וּ֝לְסַפֵּ֗ר כׇּל־נִפְלְאוֹתֶֽיךָ׃	That I may publish with the voice of thanksgiving, and tell of all thy wondrous works.	τοῦ ἀκοῦσαί με φωνῆς αἰνέσεώς σου καὶ διηγήσασθαι πάντα τὰ θαυμάσιά σου.
8	יְֽהֹוָ֗ה אָ֭הַבְתִּי מְע֣וֹן בֵּיתֶ֑ךָ וּ֝מְק֗וֹם מִשְׁכַּ֥ן כְּבוֹדֶֽךָ׃	LORD, I have loved the habitation of thy house, and the place where thine honour dwelleth.	Κύριε, ἠγάπησα εὐπρέπειαν οἴκου σου καὶ τόπον σκηνώματος δόξης σου.
9	אַל־תֶּאֱסֹ֣ף עִם־חַטָּאִ֣ים נַפְשִׁ֑י וְעִם־אַנְשֵׁ֖י דָמִ֣ים חַיָּֽי׃	Gather not my soul with sinners, nor my life with bloody men:	μὴ συναπολέσῃς μετὰ ἀσεβῶν τὴν ψυχήν μου καὶ μετὰ ἀνδρῶν αἱμάτων τὴν ζωήν μου,
10	אֲשֶׁר־בִּידֵיהֶ֥ם זִמָּ֑ה וִ֝ימִינָ֗ם מָ֣לְאָה שֹּֽׁחַד׃	In whose hands is mischief, and their right hand is full of bribes.	ὧν ἐν χερσὶν ἀνομίαι, ἡ δεξιὰ αὐτῶν ἐπλήσθη δώρων.
11	וַ֭אֲנִי בְּתֻמִּ֥י אֵלֵ֗ךְ פְּדֵ֣נִי וְחׇנֵּֽנִי׃	But as for me, I will walk in mine integrity: redeem me, and be merciful unto me.	ἐγὼ δὲ ἐν ἀκακίᾳ μου ἐπορεύθην· λύτρωσαί με καὶ ἐλέησόν με.
12	רַ֭גְלִי עָמְדָ֣ה בְמִישׁ֑וֹר בְּ֝מַקְהֵלִ֗ים אֲבָרֵ֥ךְ יְהֹוָֽה׃	My foot standeth in an even place: in the congregations will I bless the LORD.	ὁ πούς μου ἔστη ἐν εὐθύτητι· ἐν ἐκκλησίαις εὐλογήσω σε, Κύριε.

== Uses ==
=== New Testament ===
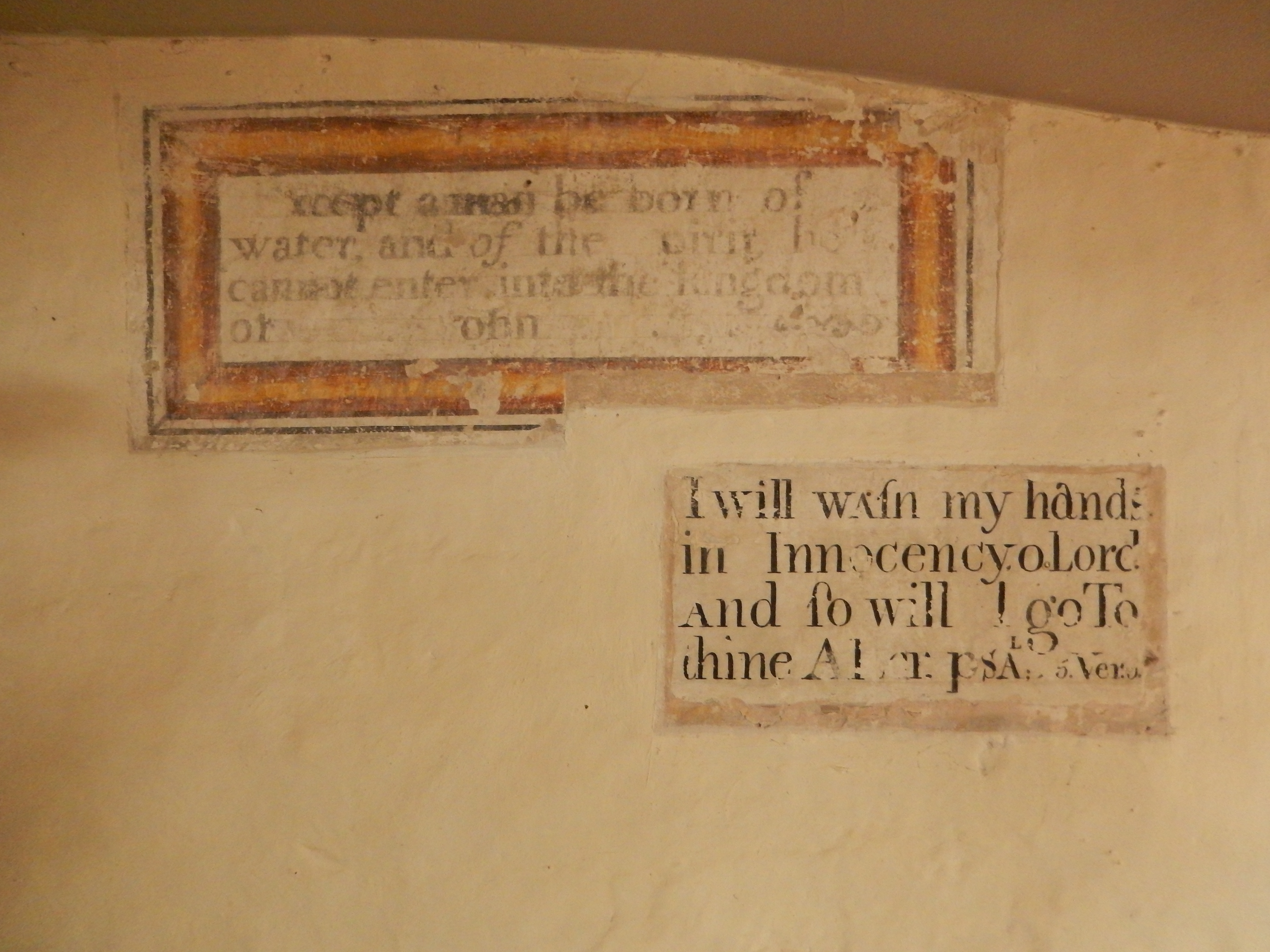
Wall paintings of the text of John 3:5 and Psalm 26:6 "I will wash my hands in innocency, o Lord, and so will I go to thine altar" at St James in Bramley, Hampshire

Speculatively, this psalm is referenced in the story of the public trial of Jesus. After succumbing to the wishes of the gathered crowd, Pontius Pilate purportedly washed his hands to show his innocence of their judgement. In the account, this could function as an outward display of someone mechanically following the psalm verse, but it would be apparent to the original Jewish audience that his abdication of the responsibility of judging justly was not in its spirit.

=== Judaism ===
In Judaism, verse 8 is the third verse of Ma Tovu.

=== Catholic Church ===
According to the monastic tradition this psalm was since St. Benedict of Nursia, performed during the celebration of matins of Sundays. Today, Psalm 26 is recited or sung during the Daytime Hours on Friday Week 1.

Verses 6-12 are said during the Lavabo (washing of the hands) of the Tridentine Mass.

=== Eastern Orthodox Church ===
In the Eastern Orthodox Church, Psalm 25 (Psalm 26 in the Masoretic Text) is part of the fourth Kathisma division of the Psalter, read at Matins on Monday mornings, as well as on Wednesdays during Lent at the Sixth Hour.

Psalm 25/26 is also read at the rite of the consecration of a church, after the consecration of the altar.

=== Coptic Orthodox Church ===
In the Agpeya, the Coptic Church's book of hours, this psalm is prayed in the office of Terce.

=== Book of Common Prayer ===
In the Church of England's Book of Common Prayer, this psalm is appointed to be read on the morning of the fifth day of the month.

== Musical setting ==
Heinrich Schütz wrote a setting of a metric paraphrase of Psalm 26 in German, "Herr, schaff mir Recht, nimm dich mein an", SWV 123, for the Becker Psalter, published first in 1628.
