= Psalm 27 =

Biblical psalm

- "The LORD is my light and my salvation; whom shall I fear?"
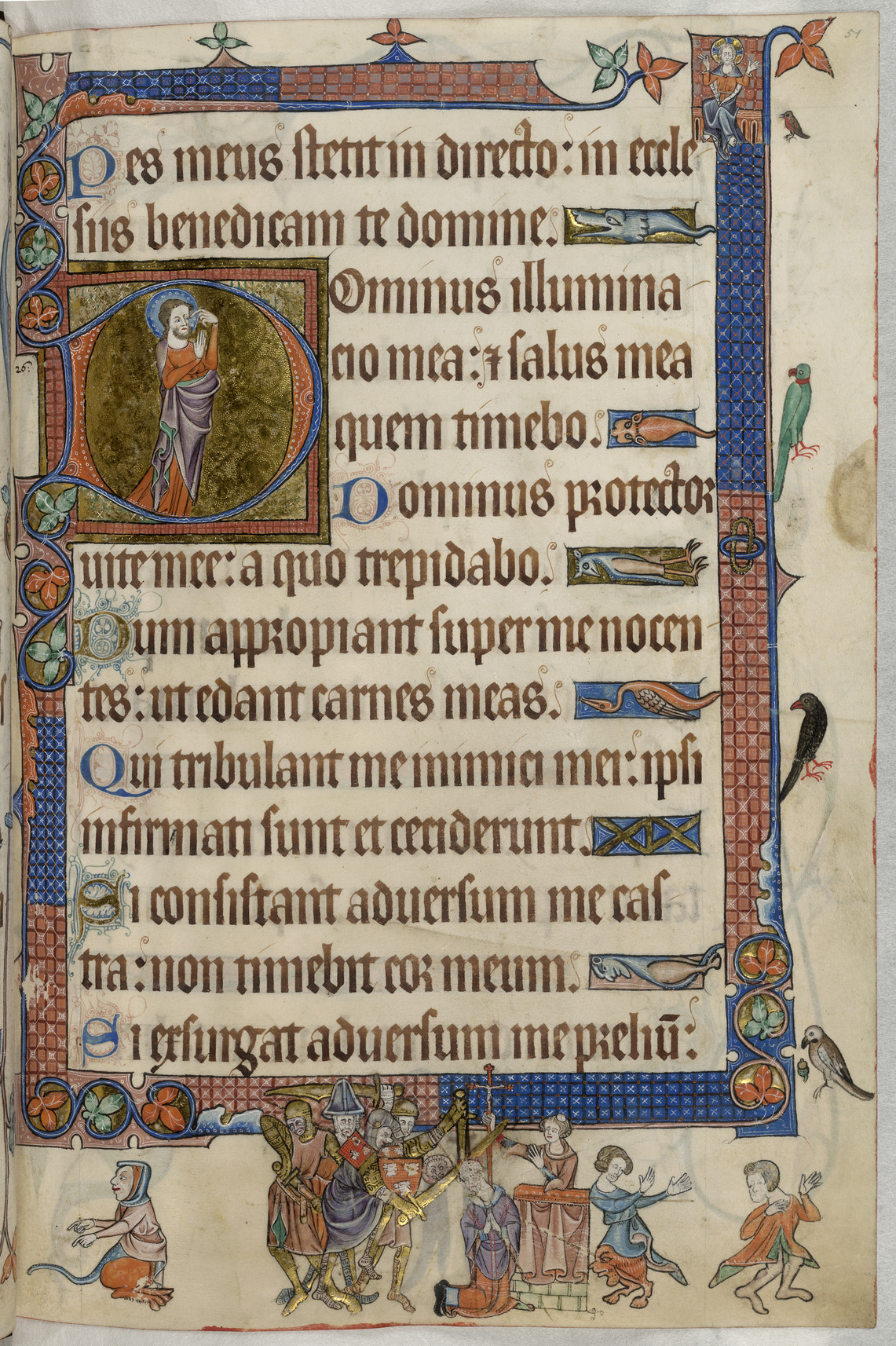
- The beginning with initial 'D' in the Luttrell Psalter
- Other name: Psalm 26 (Vulgate); "Dominus illuminatio mea"
- Language: Hebrew (original)

Psalm 27
- ← Psalm 26 Psalm 28 →
- Book: Book of Psalms
- Hebrew Bible part: Ketuvim
- Order in the Hebrew part: 1
- Category: Sifrei Emet
- Christian Bible part: Old Testament
- Order in the Christian part: 19

Psalm 27 is the 27th psalm of the Book of Psalms, beginning in English in the King James Version: "The LORD is my light and my salvation; whom shall I fear?". The Book of Psalms is part of the third section of the Tanakh, and a book of the Christian Old Testament. In the slightly different numbering system used in the Greek Septuagint and Latin Vulgate translations of the Bible, this psalm is Psalm 26. In Latin, it is known as "Dominus illuminatio mea".

The psalm forms a regular part of Jewish, Catholic, Lutheran, Anglican and Nonconformist Protestant liturgies. It has been set to music by Marc-Antoine Charpentier and Frances Allitsen among others.

== Authorship ==
Tradition attributes Psalm 27 to King David. Some commentators claim that it is a composite work by at least two authors brought together by an editor. Protestant Christians have traditionally thought of it as written early in David's life, during his flight from King Saul, with Charles Spurgeon suggesting specifically the incident with Doeg the Edomite (1 Samuel 21–22).

== Structure ==
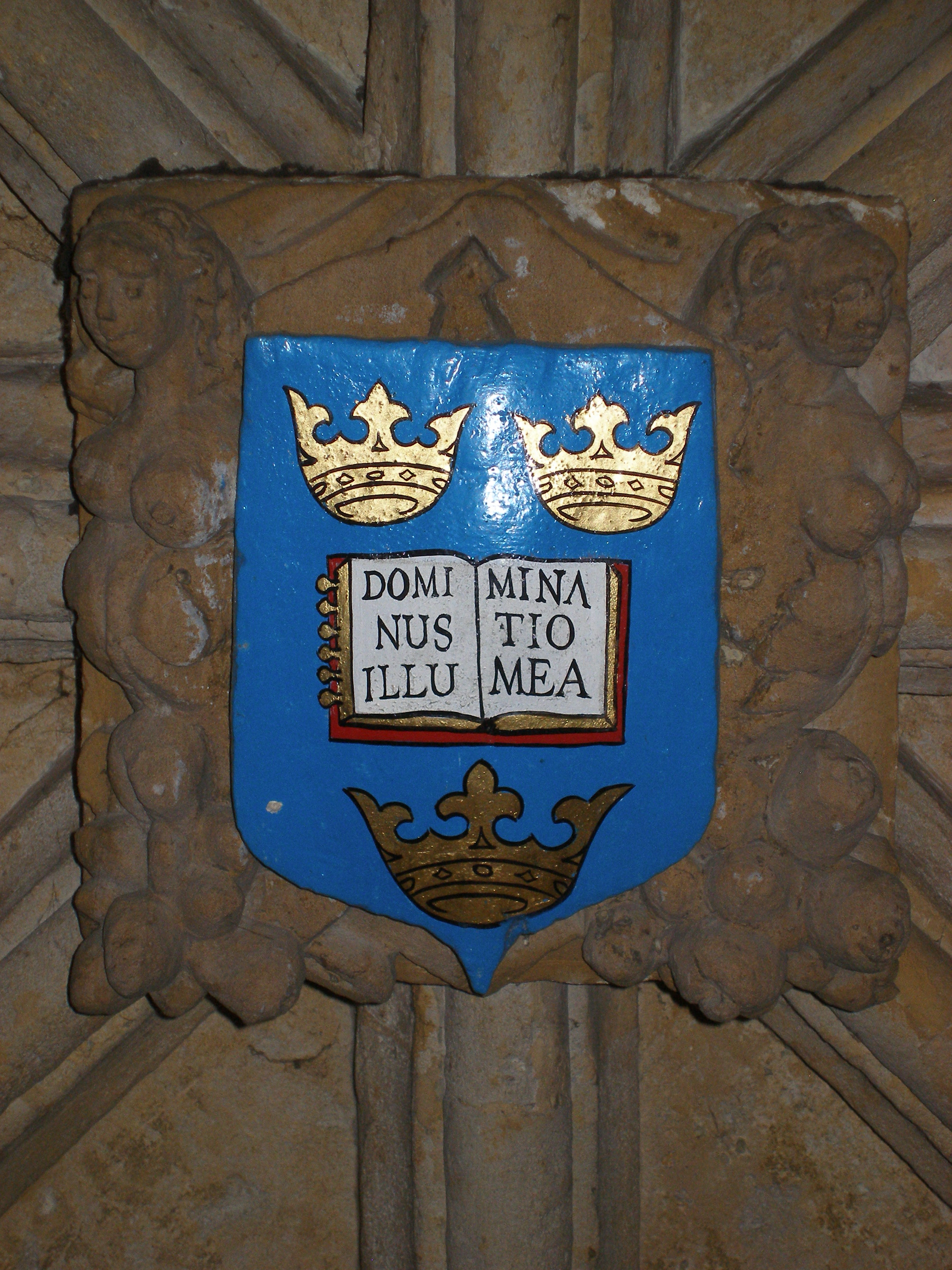
Coat of arms at Oxford University showing first verse of Psalm 27

Traditionally this Psalm is divided into two sections, verses 1–6 and 7–14. The first section declares the power of God and a boundless hope that God will bring rescue and protection from all enemies. The second portion has a clear shift in tone with the declaration "I believe". The New American Bible, Revised Edition, describes each part as "complete in itself". Some scholarship contends that it may have originally been two separate psalms.

In Hebrew the first three verses increase numerically: Two parallel phrases of five words each, then six, then seven (hinting at completion in Jewish numerology).

The Psalm is a cry for help, and ultimately a declaration of belief in the greatness of God and trust in the protection God provides. It may be a sequel to the preceding psalm.

== Uses ==
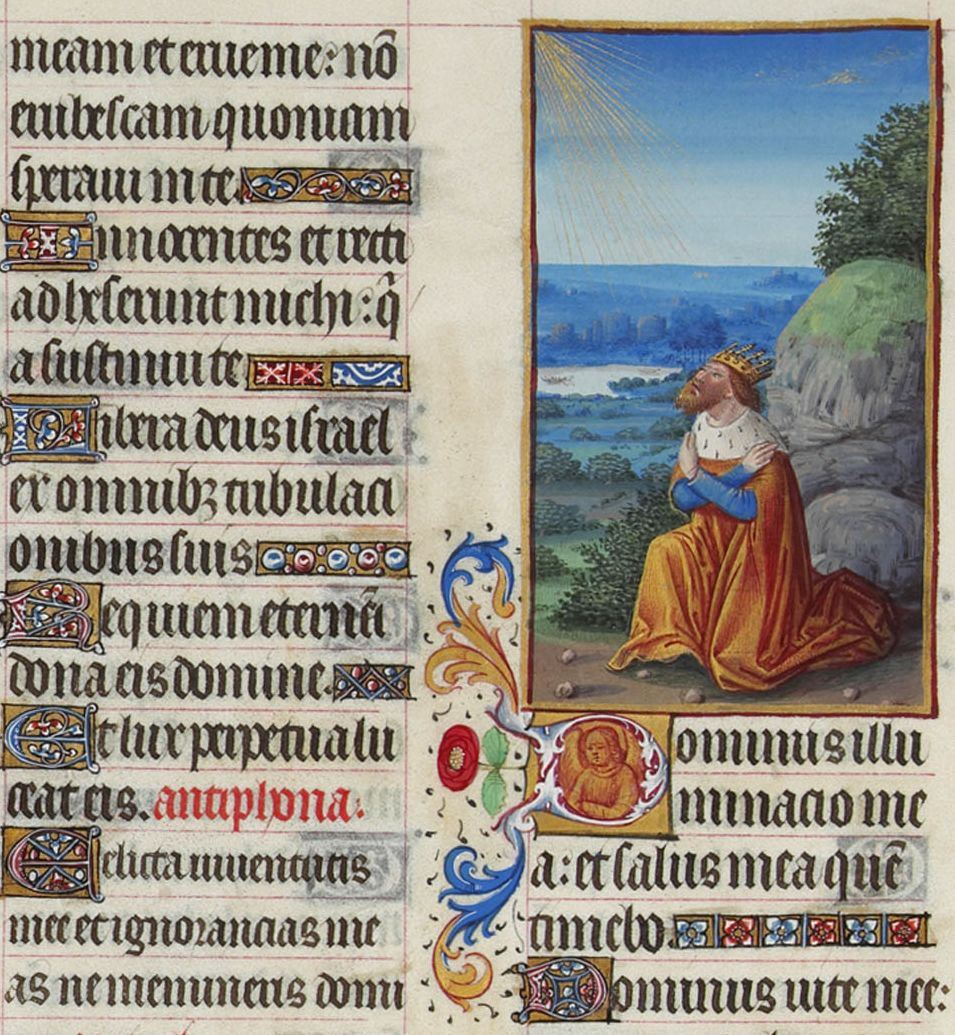
Les Très Riches Heures du duc de Berry, Folio 92v - Psalm XXVI the Musée Condé, Chantilly. Psalm 27 in the Tanakh (and most modern translations).

=== Judaism ===
- Many Sephardic communities recite this Psalm every weekday at the end of Shacharit.
- In most Ashkenazic communities, it recited twice daily (in Shacharit, and either Mincha or Maariv) from Rosh Chodesh Elul to Shemini Atzeret (in Israel, until Hoshana Rabbah), a period of repentance based in the Midrash. This custom does not seem to be older than the 17th century, and in some communities it was never accepted, and some communities recite it in Shacharit only.
- Verse 7 is alluded to in the piyyutim recited in Nusach Ashkenaz and Nusach Sefard during the repetition of the Shacharit Amidah on the second day of Rosh Hashanah.
- Verse 14 is the opening of verses recited by some before Ein Keloheinu.

=== Catholicism ===
In the Roman Rite liturgy, this Psalm is recited, divided into its two parts, at Vespers on Wednesday of the first week of the four-week cycle, as well as being used often as a responsorial psalm at Mass.

A New Catholic Commentary on Holy Scripture says the first poem of which Psalm 27 is composed is an expression of confidence that God will bring help and of devotion to the Temple, and the second is a cry for help. Mary Kathleen Glavich's The Catholic Companion to the Psalms recounts how a woman wrote the first verses of Psalm 27 (boundless hope that God will bring rescue) on the wall of the brothel room where she was confined against her will. Pope John Paul II also spoke of the first part of the psalm as "marked by a deep tranquillity, based on trust in God on the dark day of the evildoers' assault". In the second part too, he said, "the decisive element is the trust of the person of prayer in the Lord", whose face the person seeks, an expression of "the mystical need of divine intimacy through prayer", an intimacy made possible even in this life through Christ.

=== Protestantism ===
Matthew Henry similarly saw the Psalm as a metaphor for the Christian life, that "whatever the Christian is as to this life, he considers the favour and service of God as the one thing needful..." while Spurgeon sees the Psalm as at once the language of David, but also descriptive of the Church, and Jesus. Calvin saw it more as a prayer of thankfulness and composure.

The late Dr Helen Roseveare, a medical missionary to the Congo, doctor and author, used Psalm 27:3 and seeking the beauty of God in her exhortation to persevere as part of her advice: "Here's one thing you should know, one thing you should do and one thing we should ask for to keep on keeping on" and considered it akin to Matthew 6:33, "Seek first the kingdom of heaven and his righteousness".

=== Book of Common Prayer ===
In the Church of England's Book of Common Prayer, this psalm, entitled Dominus illuminatio, is appointed to be read on the evening of the fifth day of the month.

=== Coptic Orthodox Church ===
In the Agpeya, the Coptic Church's book of hours, this psalm is prayed in the office of Prime. It is also in the prayer of the Veil, which is generally prayed only by monks.

== Musical settings ==
Heinrich Schütz wrote a setting of a metric paraphrase of Psalm 27 in German, "Mein Licht und Heil ist Gott der Herr", SWV 124, for the Becker Psalter, published first in 1628. Marc-Antoine Charpentier composed "Dominus illuminatio mea", H.229 in 1699 for soloists, chorus, strings and continuo.

Frances Allitsen composed a musical setting based on Psalm 27 for voice and piano called "The Lord is My Light," published in 1897.

Alan Hovhaness set portions of this psalm and Psalm 117 for his 1935 work The God of Glory Thundereth.

=== In popular culture ===
The psalm is featured in the 2017 Western film Hostiles.

== Text ==
The following table shows the Hebrew text of the Psalm with vowels, alongside the Koine Greek text in the Septuagint and the English translation from the King James Version. Note that the meaning can slightly differ between these versions, as the Septuagint and the Masoretic Text come from different textual traditions. (Note: A 1917 translation directly from Hebrew to English by the Jewish Publication Society can be found here or here, and an 1844 translation directly from the Septuagint by L. C. L. Brenton can be found here. Both translations are in the public domain.) In the Septuagint, this psalm is numbered Psalm 26.

#	Hebrew	English	Greek
1	לְדָוִ֨ד ׀ יְהֹוָ֤ה ׀ אוֹרִ֣י וְ֭יִשְׁעִי מִמִּ֣י אִירָ֑א יְהֹוָ֥ה מָעוֹז־חַ֝יַּ֗י מִמִּ֥י אֶפְחָֽד׃	(A Psalm of David.) The LORD is my light and my salvation; whom shall I fear? the LORD is the strength of my life; of whom shall I be afraid?	Τοῦ Δαυΐδ· πρὸ τοῦ χρισθῆναι. - ΚΥΡΙΟΣ φωτισμός μου καὶ σωτήρ μου· τίνα φοβηθήσομαι; Κύριος ὑπερασπιστὴς τῆς ζωῆς μου· ἀπὸ τίνος δειλιάσω;
2	בִּקְרֹב עָלַי מְרֵעִים לֶאֱכֹל אֶת־בְּשָׂרִי צָרַי וְאֹיְבַי לִי הֵמָּה כָשְׁלוּ וְנָפָלוּ׃	When the wicked, even mine enemies and my foes, came upon me to eat up my flesh, they stumbled and fell.	ἐν τῷ ἐγγίζειν ἐπ᾿ ἐμὲ κακοῦντας τοῦ φαγεῖν τὰς σάρκας μου, οἱ θλίβοντές με καὶ οἱ ἐχθροί μου, αὐτοὶ ἠσθένησαν καὶ ἔπεσαν.
3	אִם־תַּחֲנֶה עָלַי מַחֲנֶה לֹא־יִירָא לִבִּי אִם־תָּקוּם עָלַי מִלְחָמָה בְּזֹאת אֲנִי בוֹטֵחַ׃	Though an host should encamp against me, my heart shall not fear: though war should rise against me, in this will I be confident.	ἐὰν παρατάξηται ἐπ᾿ ἐμὲ παρεμβολή, οὐ φοβηθήσεται ἡ καρδία μου· ἐὰν ἐπαναστῇ ἐπ᾿ ἐμὲ πόλεμος, ἐν ταύτῃ ἐγὼ ἐλπίζω.
4	אַחַת שָׁאַלְתִּי מֵאֵת־יְהוָה אוֹתָהּ אֲבַקֵּשׁ שִׁבְתִּי בְּבֵית־יְהוָה כָּל־יְמֵי חַיַּי לַחֲזוֹת בְּנֹעַם־יְהוָה וּלְבַקֵּר בְּהֵיכָלוֹ׃	One thing have I desired of the LORD, that will I seek after; that I may dwell in the house of the LORD all the days of my life, to behold the beauty of the LORD, and to enquire in his temple.	μίαν ᾐτησάμην παρὰ Κυρίου, ταύτην ἐκζητήσω· τοῦ κατοικεῖν με ἐν οἴκῳ Κυρίου πάσας τὰς ἡμέρας τῆς ζωῆς μου, τοῦ θεωρεῖν με τὴν τερπνότητα Κυρίου καὶ ἐπισκέπτεσθαι τὸν ναὸν τὸν ἅγιον αὐτοῦ.
5	כִּי יִצְפְּנֵנִי בְּסֻכֹּה בְּיוֹם רָעָה יַסְתִּרֵנִי בְּסֵתֶר אָהֳלוֹ בְּצוּר יְרוֹמְמֵנִי׃	For in the time of trouble he shall hide me in his pavilion: in the secret of his tabernacle shall he hide me; he shall set me up upon a rock.	ὅτι ἔκρυψέ με ἐν σκηνῇ αὐτοῦ ἐν ἡμέρᾳ κακῶν μου, ἐσκέπασέ με ἐν ἀποκρύφῳ τῆς σκηνῆς αὑτοῦ, ἐν πέτρᾳ ὕψωσέ με.
6	וְעַתָּה יָרוּם רֹאשִׁי עַל אֹיְבַי סְבִיבוֹתַי וְאֶזְבְּחָה בְאָהֳלוֹ זִבְחֵי תְרוּעָה אָשִׁירָה וַאֲזַמְּרָה לַיהוָה׃	And now shall mine head be lifted up above mine enemies round about me: therefore will I offer in his tabernacle sacrifices of joy; I will sing, yea, I will sing praises unto the LORD.	καὶ νῦν ἰδοὺ ὕψωσε κεφαλήν μου ἐπ᾿ ἐχθρούς μου· ἐκύκλωσα καὶ ἔθυσα ἐν τῇ σκηνῇ αὐτοῦ θυσίαν ἀλαλαγμοῦ, ᾄσομαι καὶ ψαλῶ τῷ Κυρίῳ.
7	שְׁמַע־יְהוָה קוֹלִי אֶקְרָא וְחָנֵּנִי וַעֲנֵנִי׃	Hear, O LORD, when I cry with my voice: have mercy also upon me, and answer me.	εἰσάκουσον, Κύριε, τῆς φωνῆς μου, ἧς ἐκέκραξα· ἐλέησόν με καὶ εἰσάκουσόν μου.
8	לְךָ אָמַר לִבִּי בַּקְּשׁוּ פָנָי אֶת־פָּנֶיךָ יְהוָה אֲבַקֵּשׁ׃	When thou saidst, Seek ye my face; my heart said unto thee, Thy face, LORD, will I seek.	σοὶ εἶπεν ἡ καρδία μου· ἐξεζήτησέ σε τὸ πρόσωπόν μου· τὸ πρόσωπόν σου, Κύριε, ζητήσω.
9	אַל־תַּסְתֵּר פָּנֶיךָ מִמֶּנִּי אַל־תַּט־בְּאַף עַבְדֶּךָ עֶזְרָתִי הָיִיתָ אַל־תִּטְּשֵׁנִי וְאַל־תַּעַזְבֵנִי אֱלֹהֵי יִשְׁעִי׃	Hide not thy face far from me; put not thy servant away in anger: thou hast been my help; leave me not, neither forsake me, O God of my salvation.	μὴ ἀποστρέψῃς τὸ πρόσωπόν σου ἀπ᾿ ἐμοῦ καὶ μὴ ἐκκλίνῃς ἐν ὀργῇ ἀπὸ τοῦ δούλου σου· βοηθός μου γενοῦ, μὴ ἀποσκορακίσῃς με καὶ μὴ ἐγκαταλίπῃς με, ὁ Θεός, ὁ σωτήρ μου.
10	כִּי־אָבִי וְאִמִּי עֲזָבוּנִי וַיהוָה יַאַסְפֵנִי׃	When my father and my mother forsake me, then the LORD will take me up.	ὅτι ὁ πατήρ μου καὶ ἡ μήτηρ μου ἐγκατέλιπόν με, ὁ δὲ Κύριος προσελάβετό με.
11	הוֹרֵנִי יְהוָה דַּרְכֶּךָ וּנְחֵנִי בְּאֹרַח מִישׁוֹר לְמַעַן שׁוֹרְרָי׃	Teach me thy way, O LORD, and lead me in a plain path, because of mine enemies.	νομοθέτησόν με, Κύριε, ἐν τῇ ὁδῷ σου καὶ ὁδήγησόν με ἐν τρίβῳ εὐθείᾳ ἕνεκα τῶν ἐχθρῶν μου.
12	אַל־תִּתְּנֵנִי בְּנֶפֶשׁ צָרָי כִּי קָמוּ־בִי עֵדֵי־שֶׁקֶר וִיפֵחַ חָמָס׃	Deliver me not over unto the will of mine enemies: for false witnesses are risen up against me, and such as breathe out cruelty.	μὴ παραδῷς με εἰς ψυχὰς θλιβόντων με, ὅτι ἐπανέστησάν μοι μάρτυρες ἄδικοι, καὶ ἐψεύσατο ἡ ἀδικία ἑαυτῇ.
13	לוּלֵא הֶאֱמַנְתִּי לִרְאוֹת בְּטוּב־יְהוָה בְּאֶרֶץ חַיִּים׃	I had fainted, unless I had believed to see the goodness of the LORD in the land of the living.	πιστεύω τοῦ ἰδεῖν τὰ ἀγαθὰ Κυρίου ἐν γῇ ζώντων.
14	קַוֵּה אֶל־יְהוָה חֲזַק וְיַאֲמֵץ לִבֶּךָ וְקַוֵּה אֶל־יְהוָה׃	Wait on the LORD: be of good courage, and he shall strengthen thine heart: wait, I say, on the LORD.	ὑπόμεινον τὸν Κύριον· ἀνδρίζου, καὶ κραταιούσθω ἡ καρδία σου, καὶ ὑπόμεινον τὸν Κύριον.
