= The Lord Is My Light =

"The Lord is My Light" is a song by Frances Allitsen based on Psalm 27, published by Boosey & Hawkes. According to the 1897 printing of the sheet music it was sung by Clara Butt to Clifford Harrison.

"The Lord is My Light"
Solo version accompanied by organ

The Lord is my light and my salvation. Whom, then shall I fear?
The Lord is the strength of my life. Of whom then shall I be afraid?
Though a host of men were laid against me, yet shall not my heart be afraid;
And tho’ there rose up war against me, yet will I put my trust in Him.
For in the time of trouble, He shall hide me in His tabernacle.
Yea, in the secret places of His dwelling shall He hide me,
And set me up upon a rock of stone.
