= Frances Allitsen =

English composer

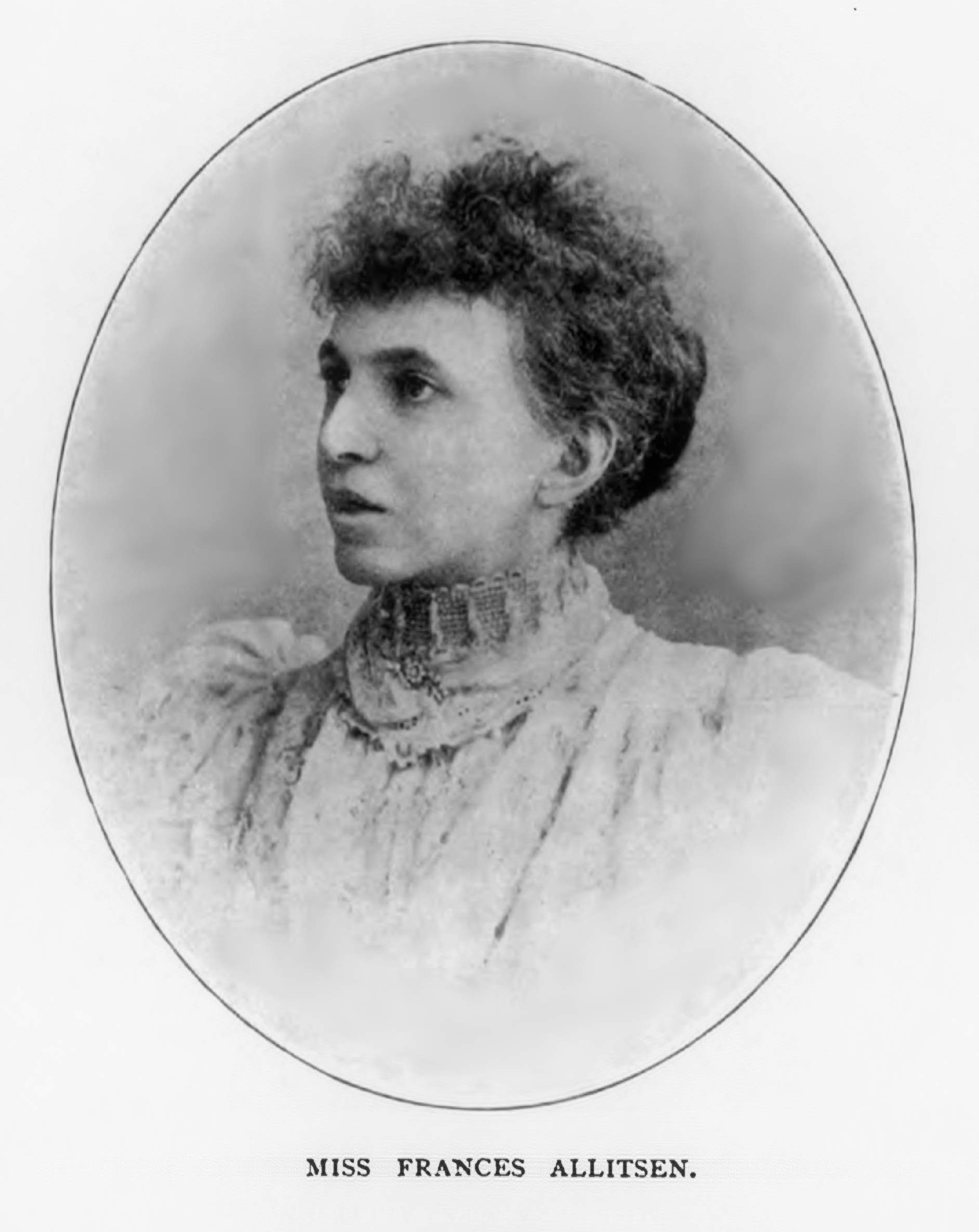
Frances Allitsen c. 1890

Mary Frances Allitsen (30 December 1848 – 1 October 1912), born Mary Frances Bumpus was an English composer. One of her most popular songs is a setting of Psalm 27, "The Lord is My Light".

== Early life ==
Mary Frances Bumpus was born on Oxford Street in London, daughter of bookseller John Bumpus (1817/8-1880) and Emma Louisa (1824/5-1892), née Barton. As a child she was far more inclined to literature than to music; her parents were opposed to a woman entering the musical profession. But although she had written a novel and some short stories, she finally abandoned literature and devoted herself to music. The family moved to a small village where Frances felt isolated and lonely. She said of that time, "It was impossible to go out walking of an afternoon without it being imputed that I was going to see the young men come in on the train, where the chief subject of conversation was garments, and the most extravagant excitement sandwich parties." Her family did not support her interest in music and as a result she was discouraged from seeking a formal education in the subject.

== Musical career ==
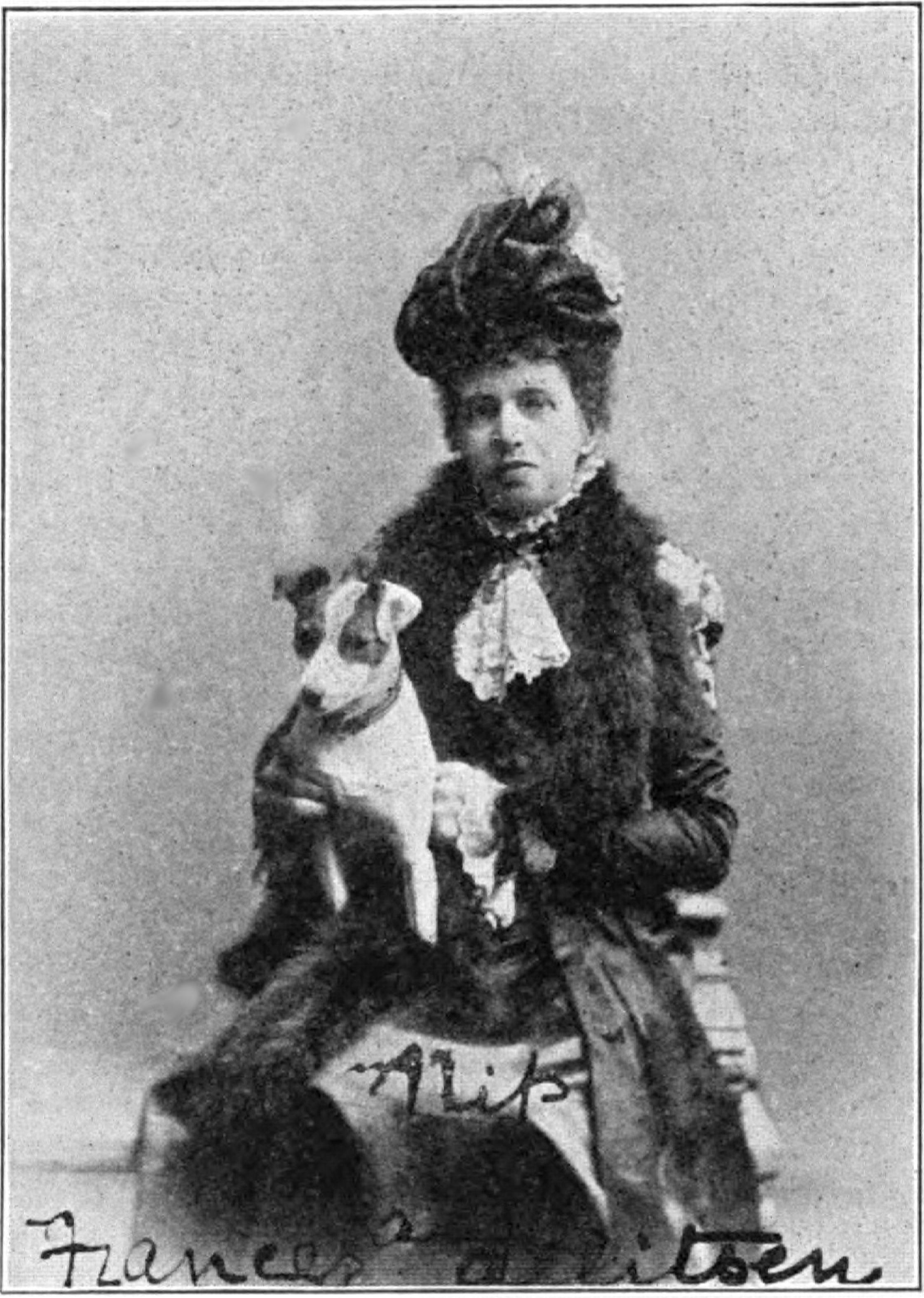
Frances Allitsen at the time of her American tour

She began her musical career as a singer and appeared as contralto soloist in Louis Spohr's The Last Judgement at a recital in Kilburn. Her voice failed, however, and she ended her singing career and turned to voice coaching and composing. She took some of her compositions to Thomas Henry Weist Hill, principal of the Guildhall School of Music, and he expressed his regret that she had put off serious study till so late. She began to apply herself to her musical studies with determination, but because she had to teach in order to support herself, and, at that time, this required travelling to her pupils' residences on trains and buses, she had to confine her studies to the night hours, in a state of fatigue. Later, on tour in America to promote her music, she told Etude magazine that, looking back, she scarcely knew how she lived through those days.

Allitsen's first success was the "Old English Love Song." Her Album of Six Songs was very well received. She also received high praise for eight settings of poems by Heine. "Prince Ivan's Song," taken from A Romance of Two Worlds, was described by Marie Corelli, the writer of that work, as "the very fire of sound."

Allitsen published over fifty songs in many different styles, the most successful being a "Song of Thanksgiving," "Mary Hamilton," "False or True," "Spring Contrasts," "King Duncan's Daughter" and "King and Slave." C. Hayden Coffin, Clara Butt, Esther Palliser and Ada Crossley did much to popularise them.

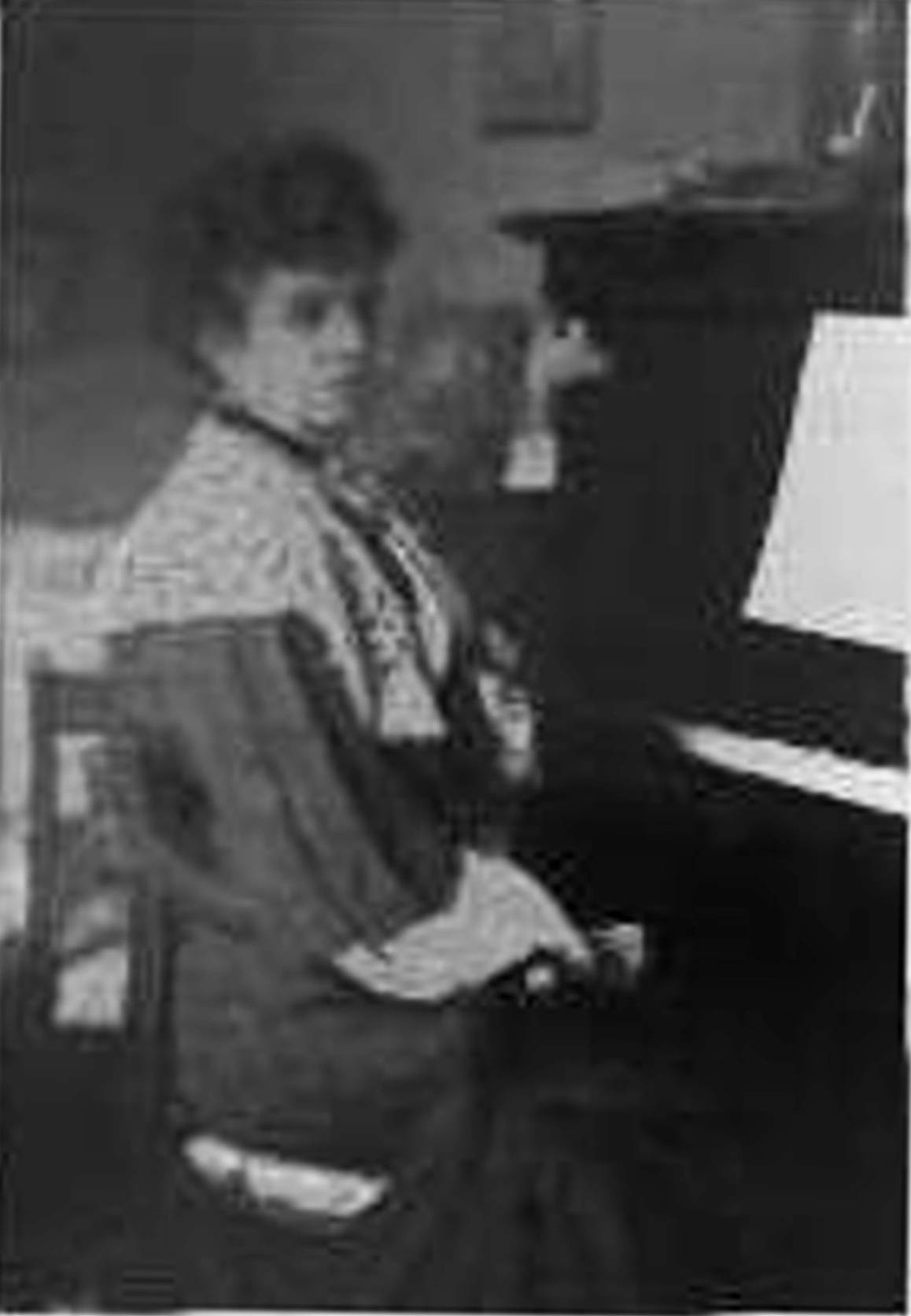
Frances Allitsen at the piano.

She also wrote two overtures, entitled Undine and Slavonique, a Funeral March, and a Tarantella, (which were performed by the Royal Artillery Band under Cavaliere Ladislao Zavertal, (Note: Ladislao Zavertal, Cavaliere, Order of the Crown of Italy, born Milan Sep. 29, 1849. Appointed conductor of the Royal Artillery Band 1881 – César Saerchinger, Ed. (1918) International Who's who in Music and Musical Gazetteer, New York) and by the Crystal Palace orchestra), and Caprice, played by pianist Vladimir de Pachmann, a sonata, and other piano pieces. De Pachmann said, "Miss Allitsen possesses four gifts for composition: Originality, imagination, feeling, and grace."

In some of her settings of poems by Tennyson and Heine, and in her songs "The Lute Player", "Love is a Bubble" and "Fidelity", Strand Musical Magazine said that she displayed "dramatic talent and virility."

A mezzo-soprano, Allitsen was also well known as a singing teacher.

== Personal life ==
She is reported by several sources as having kept a photograph of Lord Kitchener of Khartoum on her piano. Having been in poor health for many years, she told a reporter, "Whenever I feel like shirking my duty I look at his portrait." She later read herself quoted as having said that she could not compose without a picture of Lord Kitchener before her.

== Selected works ==
- "Adieu! Love" (1895)
- "Afterward" (1901)
- "Like Violets Pale" (1898) – words by James Thomson
- "The Lord is My Light" (1897)
- "The Nightingale has a Lyre of Gold" (1900 or earlier)
- "O Death, it is the Cold Night" (1901 or earlier)
- "Since My Love Now Loves Me Not" (1901 or earlier)
- "A Song of Thanksgiving" (1915 or earlier)
- "The Spring, My Dear, is no Longer Spring" (1916 or earlier)
- "There's a Land" (1897) – words by Charles MacKay
- "When the Boys Come Home" (1898) – words by Colonel John Hay
- Album of Eight Songs (1900) – words by Heinrich Heine
