= Emilie Grace Briggs =

Theologian

Emilie Grace Briggs (1867 in Berlin–1944) was an American writer. The daughter of Charles Augustus Briggs, the controversial theologian, and Julia Valentine Briggs, Briggs was the first female graduate, of Union Theological Seminary, graduating with a Bachelor of Divinity in 1897. Her graduation came just one year after women were allowed to 'visit' classes for the first time. She devoted her life to biblical exegesis and teaching, care for her father's estate (including his unpublished works), and her ongoing study of "women as deacons." She is listed as a co-author of several of her father's books. When her father died in 1913, the task of finishing many of father's works in progress at the time. Despite significant effort on Briggs's part, her success at further publication was limited. Her papers are available at the Columbia University Libraries.

== Bibliography ==
- A Critical and Exegetical Commentary on the Book of Psalms, Briggs, Charles A. (Charles Augustus), 1841–1913; Briggs, Emilie Grace, (1906).
