= List of cantatas by Christoph Graupner =

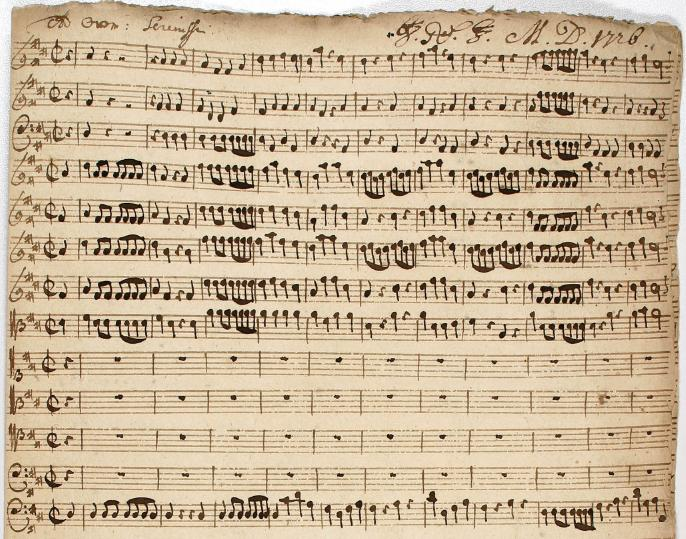
Christoph Graupner's cantata for the birthday of Landgraf Ernst Ludwig, December 1726

This is a list of church cantatas by Christoph Graupner (1683–1760), the German harpsichordist and composer of high Baroque music.

The format is to list by GWV number, followed by title, year, scoring and religious feast day or holiday the cantata was composed for. Graupner wrote a large number of church cantatas, more than 1,400.

== Church cantatas by GWV number ==
=== GWV 1101 ===
- GWV 1101/12: Wache auf, meine Ehre (1712) – SATB, ob (2), str, bc – 1st Sunday in Advent
- GWV 1101/14: Hosianna Jesus ziehet bei uns ein (1714) – SSATB, ob (2), hn (2), str, bc – 1st Sunday in Advent
- GWV 1101/17: Welch Glanz erhellt den Dampf (1717) – SSATB, ob (2), str, bc – 1st Sunday in Advent
- GWV 1101/19: Auf Zion auf ermuntre dich (1719) – SSATB, str, bc – 1st Sunday in Advent
- GWV 1101/20: Freue dich und sei fröhlich du Tochter Zion (1720) – SSTB, fl (2), str, bc – 1st Sunday in Advent
- GWV 1101/22: Die Nacht ist vergangen (1722) – SSTB, ob (2), fg, hn, str, bc – 1st Sunday in Advent
- GWV 1101/24: Jauchze du Tochter Zion (1724) – SATB, str, bc – 1st Sunday in Advent
- GWV 1101/27: Machet die Tore weit (1727) – SAT(B), fl/ob, str, bc – 1st Sunday in Advent
- GWV 1101/29: Auf Zion schreie Hosianna (1729) – SATB, str, bc – 1st Sunday in Advent
- GWV 1101/30: Der Herr ist König und herrlich geschmückt (1730) – SATB, ob am, str, bc – 1st Sunday in Advent
- GWV 1101/31: Der Herr ist König des freue sich (1731) – SATB, clar (2), timp (2), str, bc – 1st Sunday in Advent
- GWV 1101/33: Gott der Herr der Mächtige redet (1733) – SATB, (fl), hn, tra, str, bc – 1st Sunday in Advent
- GWV 1101/36: Der Herr wird König sein (1736) – SATB, ob (2), str, bc – 1st Sunday in Advent
- GWV 1101/37: Singet Gott lobsinget seinem Namen (1737) – SATB, ob (2), chal(2)ab, str, bc – 1st Sunday in Advent
- GWV 1101/39: Die Gerechten werden sich des Herrn freuen (1739) – SATB, (ob), str, bc – 1st Sunday in Advent
- GWV 1101/40: Kommet lasset uns anbeten (1740) – SATB, ob (2), fg, vla, str, bc – 1st Sunday in Advent
- GWV 1101/41: Auf Zion auf nimm Schmuck für Asche (1741) – SATB, ob (2), str, bc – 1st Sunday in Advent
- GWV 1101/42: Ziehet den alten Menschen (1742) – SATB, str, bc – 1st Sunday in Advent
- GWV 1101/43: Preise Jerusalem den Herrn (1743) – SATB, hn (2), timp (4), str, bc – 1st Sunday in Advent
- GWV 1101/44: Singet Gott lobsinget seinem Namen (1744) – SATB, ob (2), hn (2), timp (4), str, bc – 1st Sunday in Advent
- GWV 1101/46: In Zion tönen Freudenchöre (1746) – SATB, ob (2), hn (2), timp (4), str, bc – 1st Sunday in Advent
- GWV 1101/47: Der Herr ist gross zu Zion (1747) – SATB, chal(2)ab, fg, hn (2), clar (2), timp (4), str, bc – 1st Sunday in Advent
- GWV 1101/49: Ein König der die Armen (1749) – SATB, str, bc – 1st Sunday in Advent
- GWV 1101/53: Auf Zion schreie Hosianna (1753) – SSATB, ob (2), fg, clar (2), timp (4), str, bc – 1st Sunday in Advent

=== GWV 1102 ===
- GWV 1102/11a: Nehmet euch untereinander auf (1711) – SATB, ob (2), str, bc – 2nd Sunday in Advent
- GWV 1102/11b: Furcht und Zagen (1711) – S, str, bc – 2nd Sunday in Advent
- GWV 1102/13: Gott kommt mein Herz lass dich bewegen (1713) – SATB, ob (2), vl, str, bc – 2nd Sunday in Advent
- GWV 1102/21: Erde Luft und Himmel krachen (1721) – SSATB, rec (2), ob (2), fg, hn (2), str, bc – 2nd Sunday in Advent
- GWV 1102/23: O wehe des Tages (1723) – SATB, str, bc – 2nd Sunday in Advent
- GWV 1102/25: Blaset mit der Posaune zu Zion (1725) – SATB, fl (2), ob (2), hn (2), str, bc – 2nd Sunday in Advent
- GWV 1102/26: Heulet denn des Herrn Tag ist nahe (1726) – SATB, fl (2), str, bc – 2nd Sunday in Advent
- GWV 1102/27: Siehe der Herr kommt gewaltiglich (1727) – SAT, fl (2), str, bc – 2nd Sunday in Advent
- GWV 1102/28: Wir müssen alle offenbaret werden (1728) – SATB, str, bc – 2nd Sunday in Advent
- GWV 1102/32: Gott muss richten (1732) – SATB, str, bc – 2nd Sunday in Advent
- GWV 1102/34: Erhebe dich du Richter der Welt (1734) – SATB, ob (2), str, bc – 2nd Sunday in Advent
- GWV 1102/35: Er selbst der Herr (1735) – SATB, chal(2)tb, str, bc – 2nd Sunday in Advent
- GWV 1102/38: Es wird des Herrn Tag kommen (1738) – SATB, str, bc – 2nd Sunday in Advent
- GWV 1102/39: Wie lange liegst du sichre Welt (1739) – SATB, ob (2), chal(3)sab, str, bc – 2nd Sunday in Advent
- GWV 1102/40: Hebet eure Augen auf gen Himmel (1740) – SATB, fg, str, bc – 2nd Sunday in Advent
- GWV 1102/41: Mache dich mein Geist bereit (1741) – SATB, str, bc – 2nd Sunday in Advent
- GWV 1102/42: Der Herr ist Richter aller Welt (1742) – SATB, str, bc – 2nd Sunday in Advent
- GWV 1102/43: Seid wacker allezeit und betet (1743) – SATB, str, bc – 2nd Sunday in Advent
- GWV 1102/45: Sehet an den Feigenbaum (1745) – SATB, str, bc – 2nd Sunday in Advent
- GWV 1102/48: Lasset eure Lenden umgürtet sein (1748) – SATB, hn (2), str, bc – 2nd Sunday in Advent
- GWV 1102/50: Gott selbst ist Richter aller Welt (1750) – SATB, fl (2), str, bc – 2nd Sunday in Advent
- GWV 1102/52: Unser Gott kommt und schweiget nicht (1752) – SATB, str, bc – 2nd Sunday in Advent

=== GWV 1103 ===
- GWV 1103/14: Mir hat die Welt trüglich gericht (1714) – SSATB, ob, str, bc – 3rd Sunday in Advent
- GWV 1103/17: Wie wunderbar ist Gottes Güte (1717) – B, ob, fg, str, bc – 3rd Sunday in Advent
- GWV 1103/19: Gott hat sein Reich in unsern Seelen (1719) – S, vl unis, bc – 3rd Sunday in Advent
- GWV 1103/20: Wen da dürstet der komme (1720) – SSTB, str, bc – 3rd Sunday in Advent
- GWV 1103/22: So uns unser Herz nicht verdammt (1722) – SSTB, str, bc – 3rd Sunday in Advent
- GWV 1103/27: Euer Leben ist verborgen mit Christo in Gott (1727) – SAT, str, bc – 3rd Sunday in Advent
- GWV 1103/29: Mein Herz soll treu an Jesu hangen (1729) – SATB, str, bc – 3rd Sunday in Advent
- GWV 1103/31: Das Warten der Gerechten wird Freude werden (1731) – SATB, str, bc – 3rd Sunday in Advent
- GWV 1103/33: Der Herr ist freundlich (1733) – SATB, str, bc – 3rd Sunday in Advent
- GWV 1103/37: Fürchte dich vor der keinem (1737) – SATB, ob (2), str, bc – 3rd Sunday in Advent
- GWV 1103/39: Wir wissen dass der Sohn Gottes kommen ist (1739) – SATB, ob (2), chals, fg, str, bc – 3rd Sunday in Advent
- GWV 1103/40: Wer da glaubet dass Jesus sei der Christ (1740) – SATB, ob (2), str, bc – 3rd Sunday in Advent
- GWV 1103/41: Ach harter Stand für Gottes Freunde (1741) – SATB, str, bc – 3rd Sunday in Advent
- GWV 1103/42: Was willst du dich betrüben (1742) – SATB, str, bc – 3rd Sunday in Advent
- GWV 1103/43: Siehe ich lege in Zion (1743) – SATB, str, bc – 3rd Sunday in Advent
- GWV 1103/45: Lasset uns halten an der Bekenntnis (1745) – SATB, str, bc – 3rd Sunday in Advent
- GWV 1103/46: So euch der Sohn frei macht (1746) – SATB, str, bc – 3rd Sunday in Advent
- GWV 1103/47: Ihr Armen freuet euch (1747) – SATB, str, bc – 3rd Sunday in Advent
- GWV 1103/49: Böse Leute merken nicht aufs Recht (1749) – SATB, str, bc – 3rd Sunday in Advent
- GWV 1103/52: Gott der Herr der Mächtige redet (1752) – SATB, hn (2), str, bc – 3rd Sunday in Advent

=== GWV 1104 ===
- GWV 1104/09: Liebster Gott vergiss mein nicht (1709) – SATB, str, bc – 4th Sunday in Advent
- GWV 1104/11a: Mein Gott betrübt ist meine Seele (1711) – SSATB, str, bc – 4th Sunday in Advent
- GWV 1104/11b: Ach und Schmerzen klag ich Gott (1711) – SSATB, ob, (tra), str, bc – 4th Sunday in Advent
- GWV 1104/11c: Angenehmes Wasserbad (1711) – B, ob, str, bc – 4th Sunday in Advent
- GWV 1104/21: Hoheit Stolz und Fleisches Wahn (1721) – SSATB, str, bc – 4th Sunday in Advent
- GWV 1104/23: Das ist das ewige Leben (1723) – SATB, org, str, bc – 4th Sunday in Advent
- GWV 1104/27: Mit Ernst ihr Menschenkinder (1727) – SAT, str, bc – 4th Sunday in Advent
- GWV 1104/28: Schlecht und recht behüten mich (1728) – SATB, str, bc – 4th Sunday in Advent
- GWV 1104/32: Der Frommen Weg meidet das Arge (1732) – ATB, str, bc – 4th Sunday in Advent
- GWV 1104/34: Tut Busse und lasse sich ein jeglicher (1734) – SATB, str, bc – 4th Sunday in Advent
- GWV 1104/35: Wer sich selbst erhöhet (1735) – SATB, str, bc – 4th Sunday in Advent
- GWV 1104/36: Es ist eine Stimme eines Predigers (1736) – SATB, chal(2)tb, str, bc – 4th Sunday in Advent
- GWV 1104/38: Christ unser Herr zum Jordan kam (1738) – SATB, str, bc – 4th Sunday in Advent
- GWV 1104/39: Gott und Menschen sind getrennt (1739) – SATB, ob (2), clar, vl, str, bc – 4th Sunday in Advent
- GWV 1104/40: Zion du Predigerin steige auf (1740) – SATB, (ob), str, bc – 4th Sunday in Advent
- GWV 1104/41: Der Herr ist nah und niemand will ihn kennen (1741) – SATB, str, bc – 4th Sunday in Advent
- GWV 1104/42: Jerusalem du Predigerin (1742) – SATB, str, bc – 4th Sunday in Advent
- GWV 1104/48: Wer bin ich Armer (1748) – SATB, str, bc – 4th Sunday in Advent
- GWV 1104/50: Wer wahrhaftig ist der saget frei (1750) – SATB, str, bc – 4th Sunday in Advent
- GWV 1104/52: Küsset den Sohn (1752) – ATB, str, bc – 4th Sunday in Advent

=== GWV 1105 ===
- GWV 1105/12: Uns ist ein Kind geboren (1712) – SSATB, ob (2), clar (2), trb (3), timp (2), str, bc – Christmas Day
- GWV 1105/27: Jauchze frohlocke gefallene Welt (1727) – SATTB, fl (2), ob (3), fg, clar (2), timp (2), str, bc – Christmas Day
- GWV 1105/39: Ehre sei Gott in der Höhe (1739) – SATB, ob (2), clar (2), timp (2), vl, str, bc – Christmas Day
- GWV 1105/40: Der Engel Heer singt in der Höhe (1740) – SATB, ob (2), clar (2), timp (2), str, bc – Christmas Day
- GWV 1105/41: Die Engel frohlocken (1741) – SATB, ob (2), clar (2), timp (2), str, bc – Christmas Day
- GWV 1105/42: Heut ist der Tag recht freudenreich (1742) – SATB, hn (2), timp (4), str, bc – Christmas Day
- GWV 1105/43: Jauchzet ihr Himmel freue dich Erde (1743) – SATB, fg, hn (2), timp (4), str, bc – Christmas Day
- GWV 1105/44: Freude Freude über Freude (1744) – SATB, str, bc – Christmas Day
- GWV 1105/45: Frohlocke werte Christenheit (1745) – SATB, str, bc – Christmas Day
- GWV 1105/46: Es jauchze aller Kreis der Erden (1746) – SATB, hn (2), clar, timp (4), str, bc – Christmas Day
- GWV 1105/47: Der Engel Heer begeht ein Freudenfest (1747) – SATB, fl (2), fg, hn (2), clar (2), timp (4), str, bc – Christmas Day
- GWV 1105/48: Es ist erschienen die heilsame Gnade (1748) – SATB, chal(2)tb, hn (2), timp (4), str, bc – Christmas Day
- GWV 1105/49: Wenn des Königes Angesicht (1749) – SATB, fl (2), ob (2), fg (2), hn (2), timp (4), str, bc – Christmas Day
- GWV 1105/50: Frohlocket ihr Himmel (1750) – SATB, fl (2), hn (2), clar, timp (2), str, bc – Christmas Day
- GWV 1105/52: Der Herr ist allen gütig (1752) – SATB, clar (2), hn (2), timp (2), str, bc – Christmas Day
- GWV 1105/53: Jauchzet ihr Himmel erfreue dich Erde (1753) – SATB, fl (2), ob (2), hn (2), timp (4), vl, str, bc – Christmas Day

=== GWV 1106 ===
- GWV 1106/19: Ich bleibe Gott getreu (1719) – S, str, bc – 2nd Day of Christmas (St. Stefanus Day)
- GWV 1106/39: O dass sie weise wären (1739) – SATB, chal (3)stb, str, bc – 2nd Day of Christmas (St. Stefanus Day)
- GWV 1106/40: Mache dich auf Gott (1740) – SATB, ob (2), str, bc – 2nd Day of Christmas (St. Stefanus Day)
- GWV 1106/41: Es ist leider zu beklagen (1741) – SATB, ob (2), str, bc – 2nd Day of Christmas (St. Stefanus Day)
- GWV 1106/42: Ach Gott vom Himmel sieh darein (1742) – SATB, str, bc – 2nd Day of Christmas (St. Stefanus Day)
- GWV 1106/44: Rufe getrost schone nicht (1744) – SATB, str, bc – 2nd Day of Christmas (St. Stefanus Day)
- GWV 1106/45: Jerusalem wie oft habe ich (1745) – SATB, str, bc – 2nd Day of Christmas (St. Stefanus Day)
- GWV 1106/46: Sie eifern um Gott (1746) – SATB, str, bc – 2nd Day of Christmas (St. Stefanus Day)
- GWV 1106/47: Man predigt wohl viel (1747) – SATB, hn (2), str, bc – 2nd Day of Christmas (St. Stefanus Day)
- GWV 1106/48: Sehet drauf dass niemand (1748) – SATB, (fl (2)), fg (2), hn (2), str, bc – 2nd Day of Christmas (St. Stefanus Day)
- GWV 1106/49: Gerechtigkeit erhöhet ein Volk (1749) – SATB, str, bc – 2nd Day of Christmas (St. Stefanus Day)
- GWV 1106/50: Schuldige sie Gott dass sie fallen (1750) – SATB, str, bc – 2nd Day of Christmas (St. Stefanus Day)

=== GWV 1107 ===
- GWV 1107/12: Jesus ist und bleibt mein Leben (1712) – SB, ob (2), hn (2), vl (2), bc – 3rd Day of Christmas (St John's Day)
- GWV 1107/27: Siehe da eine Hütte Gottes (1727) – SAT, fl, fg, str, bc – 3rd Day of Christmas (St John's Day)
- GWV 1107/39: Sehet welch eine Liebe (1739) – SATB, (fl), str, bc – 3rd Day of Christmas (St John's Day)
- GWV 1107/40: Das Licht des Lebens scheinet hell (1740) – SATB, (ob), str, bc – 3rd Day of Christmas (St John's Day)
- GWV 1107/41: Ein Gnadenglanz strahlt (1741) – B, str, bc – 3rd Day of Christmas (St John's Day)
- GWV 1107/43: Gott wird ein schwaches Menschenkind (1743) – SATB, str, bc – 3rd Day of Christmas (St John's Day)
- GWV 1107/44: Das Licht des Lebens gehet auf (1744) – S, clar, vl, str, bc – 3rd Day of Christmas (St John's Day)
- GWV 1107/45: Das Leben war das Licht der Menschen (1745) – T, str, bc – 3rd Day of Christmas (St John's Day)
- GWV 1107/46: Das Licht scheint in der Finsternis (1746) – SATB, str, bc – 3rd Day of Christmas (St John's Day)
- GWV 1107/47: Das ewige Licht geht da herein (1747) – T, str, bc – 3rd Day of Christmas (St John's Day)
- GWV 1107/48: Wandelt wie die Kinder (1748) – SATB, chal (2)ab, hn (2), str, bc – 3rd Day of Christmas (St John's Day)
- GWV 1107/49: Der Herr hat mich gehabt (1749) – ATB, str, bc – 3rd Day of Christmas (St John's Day)
- GWV 1107/50: Nun freut euch lieben Christen gemein (1750) – B, vl unis, vla, bc – 3rd Day of Christmas (St John's Day)
- GWV 1107/51: Das ist das ewige Leben (1751) – SATB, (fl (2)), str, bc – 3rd Day of Christmas (St John's Day)

=== GWV 1108 ===
- GWV 1108/19: Frohlocke Zions fromme Schar (1719) – B, vl unis, bc – 1st Sunday after Christmas Day
- GWV 1108/20: Der Gerechte muss viel leiden (1720) – SSTB, str, bc – 1st Sunday after Christmas Day
- GWV 1108/21: Weht ihr Winde (1721) – SSATB, str, bc – 1st Sunday after Christmas Day
- GWV 1108/25: Wo zween oder drei versammelt sind (1725) – SATB, str, bc – 1st Sunday after Christmas Day
- GWV 1108/27: Gedenket an den der ein solches Widersprechen (1727) – SAT, str, bc – 1st Sunday after Christmas Day
- GWV 1108/30: Wie lieblich sind deine Wohnungen (1730) – ATB, str, bc – 1st Sunday after Christmas Day
- GWV 1108/31: O schönes Haus o heilger Tempel (1731) – SATB, str, bc – 1st Sunday after Christmas Day
- GWV 1108/37: Lasset uns rechtschaffen sein (1737) – SATB, str, bc – 1st Sunday after Christmas Day
- GWV 1108/41: Ach Gott vom Himmel sieh darein (1741) – SATB, ob, str, bc – 1st Sunday after Christmas Day
- GWV 1108/42: Wie lieblich sind deine Wohnungen (1742) – SATB, str, bc – 1st Sunday after Christmas Day
- GWV 1108/45: Siehe dieser wird gesetzt zu einem Fall (1745) – B, str, bc – 1st Sunday after Christmas Day
- GWV 1108/49: Den Segen hat das Haupt (1749) – SATB, str, bc – 1st Sunday after Christmas Day

=== GWV 1109 ===
- GWV 1109/14: Wie bald hast du gelitten (1714) – SATB, str, bc – New Year's Day
- GWV 1109/16: Pflüget ein Neues und säet (1716) – SSATB, str, bc – New Year's Day
- GWV 1109/18: Es ist in keinem andern Heil (1718) – SATB, (fg (2)), str, bc – New Year's Day
- GWV 1109/24: Es danke Gott wer danken kann (1724) – SATB, clar (2), timp (2), str, bc – New Year's Day
- GWV 1109/25: Danket preist Gott in der Höhe (1725) – SSATB, ob, clar (2), timp (2), str, bc – New Year's Day
- GWV 1109/28: Nun danket alle Gott (1728) – SAT, (fl), ob (2), hn (2), clar (2), timp (2), str, bc – New Year's Day
- GWV 1109/29: Gott gebe euch viel Gnade und Friede (1729) – SATB, ob (2), fg, clar (2), timp (2), str, bc – New Year's Day
- GWV 1109/30: Gott man lobet dich in der Stille (1730) – SATB, fl am, ob am, clar (2), timp (2), str, bc – New Year's Day
- GWV 1109/34: Danket dem Höchsten (1734) – SATB, fl (2), clar (2), timp (2), str, bc – New Year's Day
- GWV 1109/35: Auf gehet dem Höchsten mit Danken (1735) – SSATB, fl (2), ob (2), hn (2), timp (2), str, bc – New Year's Day
- GWV 1109/36: Kommet lasset uns anbeten (1736) – SSATB, ob (2), hn (2), timp (2), str, bc – New Year's Day
- GWV 1109/37: Jesu mein Herr und Gott allein (1737) – SATB, chal (2)tb, fg, (timp (4)), str, bc – New Year's Day
- GWV 1109/39: Es danken dir die Himmelsheere (1739) – SAATTBB, ob (2), fg, str, bc – New Year's Day
- GWV 1109/40: Halleluja Dank und Ehre (1740) – SATB, ob (2), clar (2), timp (2), vla am, str, bc – New Year's Day
- GWV 1109/41: Gott sei uns gnädig (1741) – SATB, (fl), ob (2), clar (2), timp (4), str, bc – New Year's Day
- GWV 1109/42: Herr Gott dich loben wir (1742) – SATB, fl, ob (2), clar (2), timp (2), str, bc – New Year's Day
- GWV 1109/43: Dankt Gott lobt ihn ihr Frommen (1743) – SATB, hn (2), timp (4), str, bc – New Year's Day
- GWV 1109/45: Herr wie sind deine Werke so gross (1745) – SATB, ob (2), hn (2), timp (4), str, bc – New Year's Day
- GWV 1109/50: Der Gerechten Wunsch muss doch geraten (1750) – SATB, str, bc – New Year's Day
- GWV 1109/51: Halleluja Dank und Ehre (1751) – SATB, hn (2), clar (2), timp (4), str, bc – New Year's Day
- GWV 1109/53: Bringet her dem Herrn die Ehre (1753) – SATB, hn (2), clar (2), timp (5), str, bc – New Year's Day

=== GWV 1110 ===
- GWV 1110/21: Es ist ein köstlich Ding (1721) – SSTB, str, bc – Sunday after New Year
- GWV 1110/22: Sei getrost Gott lässt keinen (1722) – STB, str, bc – Sunday after New Year
- GWV 1110/27: Wir leiden Verfolgung (1727) – SATB, fl (2), ob (2), str, bc – Sunday after New Year
- GWV 1110/28: Er hat seinen Engeln befohlen (1728) – SAT, fg, str, bc – Sunday after New Year
- GWV 1110/32: Siehe du wirst Heiden rufen (1732) – SATB, str, bc – Sunday after New Year
- GWV 1110/33: Wer den Herrn fürchtet (1733) – ATB, str, bc – Sunday after New Year
- GWV 1110/38: Es ist ein köstlich Ding (1738) – SATBB, str, bc – Sunday after New Year
- GWV 1110/40: Fromme Herzen finden nicht (1740) – SATB, str, bc – Sunday after New Year
- GWV 1110/44: Gott wacht ob den Seinen (1744) – SATB, str, bc – Sunday after New Year
- GWV 1110/49: Werfet euer Vertrauen nicht weg (1749) – SATB, chal (2)ab, hn (2), str, bc – Sunday after New Year

=== GWV 1111 ===
- GWV 1111/10: Nimm mein Herz zum Geschenke (1710) – S, str, bc – Feast of Epiphany / (Kings of the East)
- GWV 1111/13: Du willst ein Opfer haben (1713) – B, ob (2), str, bc – Feast of Epiphany / (Kings of the East)
- GWV 1111/16: Mache dich auf, werde Licht (1716) – SATB, str, bc – Feast of Epiphany / (Kings of the East)
- GWV 1111/18: Es sollen dir danken alle deine Werke (1718) – SATB, fl, ob (am), clar (2), timp (2), str, bc – Feast of Epiphany / (Kings of the East)
- GWV 1111/20: Auf Zion werde Licht (1720) – SSTB, str, bc – Feast of Epiphany / (Kings of the East)
- GWV 1111/24: Sende dein Licht und deine Wahrheit (1724) – SATB, str, bc – Feast of Epiphany / (Kings of the East)
- GWV 1111/26: Auf mein Geist lass alles stehen (1726) – SATB, ob (2), fg, clar (2), timp (2), str, bc – Feast of Epiphany / (Kings of the East)
- GWV 1111/28: Der Stern aus Jakob bricht hervor (1728) – SAT, fl, ob, str, bc – Feast of Epiphany / (Kings of the East)
- GWV 1111/29: Das Volk so im Finstern wandelt (1729) – SATB, fl, ob, str, bc – Feast of Epiphany / (Kings of the East)
- GWV 1111/31: Saget unter den Heiden (1731) – SATB, clar (2), timp (2), str, bc – Feast of Epiphany / (Kings of the East)
- GWV 1111/34: Erwacht ihr Heiden (1734) – SATB, vla am, str, bc – Feast of Epiphany / (Kings of the East)
- GWV 1111/35: Es wird sein die Wurzel Jesse (1735) – SATB, str, bc – Feast of Epiphany / (Kings of the East)
- GWV 1111/37: Wo ist der neugeborne König (1737) – SATB, fl, chalb, fg, str, bc – Feast of Epiphany / (Kings of the East)
- GWV 1111/39: Das ist das ewige Leben (1739) – SATB, chals (fl, ob?), str, bc – Feast of Epiphany / (Kings of the East)
- GWV 1111/40: Erwache träge Christenschar (1740) – SATB, ob, str, bc – Feast of Epiphany / (Kings of the East)
- GWV 1111/41: Gott sei gedanket dass ihr Knechte (1741) – SATB, chal (3)stb, str, bc – Feast of Epiphany / (Kings of the East)
- GWV 1111/42: Die Andacht fragt nach dir (1742) – TB, str, bc – Feast of Epiphany / (Kings of the East)
- GWV 1111/43: Die Heiden freuen sich (1743) – SATB, str, bc – Feast of Epiphany / (Kings of the East)
- GWV 1111/44: Merk auf mein Herz und sieh dorthin (1744) – SATB, chal (2)tb, fg, timp (4), str, bc – Feast of Epiphany / (Kings of the East)
- GWV 1111/47: Das Volk so im Finstern wandelt (1747) – SATB, str, bc – Feast of Epiphany / (Kings of the East)
- GWV 1111/50: Wo soll ich meinen Jesum finden (1750) – SATB, fl (2), hn (2), str, bc – Feast of Epiphany / (Kings of the East)

=== GWV 1112 ===
- GWV 1112/14: Ach wo find' ich meine Liebe (1714) – TB, str, bc – 1st Sunday after Epiphany
- GWV 1112/21: Himmelssonne, Seelenwonne (1721) – SATB, str, bc – 1st Sunday after Epiphany
- GWV 1112/22: Lasst uns zu Gottes Tempel eilen (1722) – SATB, str, bc – 1st Sunday after Epiphany
- GWV 1112/25: Meine Seele dürstet nach Gott (1725) – SATB, ob, str, bc – 1st Sunday after Epiphany
- GWV 1112/27: Mein Schatz mein Jesus ist verloren (1727) – SATB, ob (2), fg, str, bc – 1st Sunday after Epiphany
- GWV 1112/28: Eins bitte ich vom Herrn (1728) – SAT, str, bc – 1st Sunday after Epiphany
- GWV 1112/30: Ach zarter Jesu (1730) – SATB, str, bc – 1st Sunday after Epiphany
- GWV 1112/33: Wer weise ist der höret zu (1733) – SATB, str, bc – 1st Sunday after Epiphany
- GWV 1112/36: Wir wallen hier auf rauh und ebnen Wegen (1736) – SATB, str, bc – 1st Sunday after Epiphany
- GWV 1112/38: Wie lieblich sind deine Wohnungen (1738) – SATB, str, bc – 1st Sunday after Epiphany
- GWV 1112/40: Wo bist du, Jesus, Freund der Seelen (1740) – SATB, chal (3)stb, str, bc – 1st Sunday after Epiphany
- GWV 1112/41: Lasset uns untereinander (1741) – SATB, str, bc – 1st Sunday after Epiphany
- GWV 1112/42: Zarter Jesu sei mir nahe (1742) – ATB, str, bc – 1st Sunday after Epiphany
- GWV 1112/43: Wo ist mein Jesus ach verloren (1743) – ATB, str, bc – 1st Sunday after Epiphany
- GWV 1112/44: Bei Jesu ist recht viel Vergnügen (1744) – SATB, ob, str, bc – 1st Sunday after Epiphany
- GWV 1112/46: Der zarte Jesus geht auf's Fest (1746) – SATB, str, bc – 1st Sunday after Epiphany
- GWV 1112/48: Herr ich habe lieb die Stätte (1748) – ATB, str, bc – 1st Sunday after Epiphany
- GWV 1112/49: Wer seinen Jesum recht will lieben (1749) – SATB, fl (2), hn (2), str, bc – 1st Sunday after Epiphany
- GWV 1112/51: Eins bitte ich vom Herrn (1751) – SATB, fl (2), fg, hn (2), str, bc – 1st Sunday after Epiphany

=== GWV 1113 ===
- GWV 1113/12: Freuet euch mit den Fröhlichen (1712) – SSATB, org, str, bc – 2nd Sunday after Epiphany
- GWV 1113/13: Mein Herz soll nach des Höchsten Willen (1713) – B, str, bc – 2nd Sunday after Epiphany
- GWV 1113/18: Herr du machst dein Werk lebendig (1718) – SATB, ob am, str, bc – 2nd Sunday after Epiphany
- GWV 1113/20: Die Liebe zeichnet wahre Christen (1720) – S, vl unis, bc – 2nd Sunday after Epiphany
- GWV 1113/23a: Aus der Tiefen rufen wir (Bewerbungskantate Leipzig) (1723) – SATB, ob (2), clar, trb (3), str, bc – 2nd Sunday after Epiphany
- GWV 1113/23b: Lobet den Herrn alle Heiden (Bewerbungskantate Leipzig) (1723) – SATB, ob (2), clar (2), trb (3), timp(2), str, bc – 2nd Sunday after Epiphany
- GWV 1113/24: Warum betrübst du dich mein Herz (1724) – SATB, str, bc – 2nd Sunday after Epiphany
- GWV 1113/26: Die Wege des Herrn sind eitel Güte (1726) – ATTB, str, bc – 2nd Sunday after Epiphany
- GWV 1113/28: Von Gott will ich nicht lassen (1728) – SATB, ob (2), fg, str, bc – 2nd Sunday after Epiphany
- GWV 1113/29: Mein Jesus ist mein Hausgenosse (1729) – SATB, str, bc – 2nd Sunday after Epiphany
- GWV 1113/31: Die Gerechten werden sich des Herrn freuen (1731) – SATB, str, bc – 2nd Sunday after Epiphany
- GWV 1113/32: Es wechselt Lust und Traurigkeit (1732) – SATB, str, bc – 2nd Sunday after Epiphany
- GWV 1113/35: Der Herr ist gern bei denen Seinen (1735) – SATB, chal (2)tb, str, bc – 2nd Sunday after Epiphany
- GWV 1113/37: So du freiest sündigest du nicht (1737) – SATB, str, bc – 2nd Sunday after Epiphany
- GWV 1113/39: Wohl dem der in Gottes Furcht steht (1739) – SATBB, str, bc – 2nd Sunday after Epiphany
- GWV 1113/40: Komm wert'ster Jesu sei mein Gast (1740) – SATB, ob (2), chals, fg, str, bc – 2nd Sunday after Epiphany
- GWV 1113/41: Wohl dem der ein tugendsam Weib hat (1741) – SATB, ob (2), vl, str, bc – 2nd Sunday after Epiphany
- GWV 1113/42: Nicht so traurig nicht so sehr (1742) – SATB, (ob), str, bc – 2nd Sunday after Epiphany
- GWV 1113/43: Sei stille dem Herrn und warte auf ihn (1743) – SATB, str, bc – 2nd Sunday after Epiphany
- GWV 1113/45: Die Ehe soll ehrlich gehalten werden (1745) – SATB, str, bc – 2nd Sunday after Epiphany
- GWV 1113/47: Kommet her und sehet die Werke (1747) – SATB, str, bc – 2nd Sunday after Epiphany
- GWV 1113/50: In des Gerechten Hause (1750) – SATB, str, bc – 2nd Sunday after Epiphany
- GWV 1113/54: Gott der Herr ist Sonne und Schild (1754) – SATB, fl, hn (2), str, bc – 2nd Sunday after Epiphany

=== GWV 1114 ===
- GWV 1114/14: Wenn Not und Angst am grössten ist (1714) – TB, ob (2), str, bc – 3rd Sunday after Epiphany
- GWV 1114/16: Verleih dass ich aus Herzensgrund (1716) – S, vl (2), str, bc – 3rd Sunday after Epiphany
- GWV 1114/19: Was Gott tut das ist wohlgetan (1719) – SSATB, ob, str, bc – 3rd Sunday after Epiphany
- GWV 1114/21: Meine Seele ist stille zu Gott (1721) – SATB, fl, str, bc – 3rd Sunday after Epiphany
- GWV 1114/22: Gottes Wille meint es gut (1722) – TB, str, bc – 3rd Sunday after Epiphany
- GWV 1114/25: Hoffet auf den Herrn allezeit (1725) – SATB, str, bc – 3rd Sunday after Epiphany
- GWV 1114/27: Herr wie du willst so will auch ich (1727) – SATB, str, bc – 3rd Sunday after Epiphany
- GWV 1114/30: Was Gott tut das ist wohlgetan (1730) – SATB, fl am, ob am, str, bc – 3rd Sunday after Epiphany
- GWV 1114/33: Die Rede des Freundlichen (1733) – SATB, str, bc – 3rd Sunday after Epiphany
- GWV 1114/36: Der Herr ist nahe bei denen (1736) – SATB, str, bc – 3rd Sunday after Epiphany
- GWV 1114/37: Die ganze Welt liegt voller Kranken (1737) – SAT, str, bc – 3rd Sunday after Epiphany
- GWV 1114/38: Mein Herz ehrt Gott (1738) – SATB, str, bc – 3rd Sunday after Epiphany
- GWV 1114/40: Fraget nach dem Herrn (1740) – SATB, ob (2), str, bc – 3rd Sunday after Epiphany
- GWV 1114/41: Ihr Herren was recht und gleich ist (1741) – SATB, ob (2), str, bc – 3rd Sunday after Epiphany
- GWV 1114/43: Was Gott tut das ist wohlgetan (1743) – SATB, ob, str, bc – 3rd Sunday after Epiphany
- GWV 1114/48: Jesus ist bereit zu retten (1748) – SATB, fl (2), hn (2), str, bc – 3rd Sunday after Epiphany
- GWV 1114/49: Bittet so werdet ihr nehmen (1749) – SATB, str, bc – 3rd Sunday after Epiphany
- GWV 1114/51: Der Herr ist nahe allen die ihn anrufen (1751) – SATB, str, bc – 3rd Sunday after Epiphany

=== GWV 1115 ===
- GWV 1115/13: Wenn die Meeresfluten schlagen (1713) – S, ob (2), str, bc – 4th Sunday after Epiphany
- GWV 1115/18: Ich liege und schlafe ganz in Frieden (1718) – SATB, str, bc – 4th Sunday after Epiphany
- GWV 1115/24: Gott führt die Seinen wunderbar (1724) – SATB, ob, fg/vc, org, str, bc – 4th Sunday after Epiphany
- GWV 1115/29: Zion klagt mit Angst und Schmerzen (1729) – SATB, str, bc – 4th Sunday after Epiphany
- GWV 1115/34: Herr die Wasserströme erheben sich (1734) – SATB, str, bc – 4th Sunday after Epiphany
- GWV 1115/35: Die Wasserwogen im Meer sind gross (1735) – SATB, fl, chalt, str, bc – 4th Sunday after Epiphany
- GWV 1115/40: Herr Gott Zebaoth wer ist wie du (1740) – SATB, ob (2), str, bc – 4th Sunday after Epiphany
- GWV 1115/43: Der Heiland ruht auf Flut und Wellen (1743) – SATB, str, bc – 4th Sunday after Epiphany
- GWV 1115/46: Erhöre uns nach der wunderlichen Gerechtigkeit (1746) – ATB, str, bc – 4th Sunday after Epiphany
- GWV 1115/51: Wenn die Gerechten schreien (1751) – SATB, str, bc – 4th Sunday after Epiphany

=== GWV 1116 ===
- GWV 1116/18: Seid nüchtern und wachet (1718) – SATB, str, bc – 5th Sunday after Epiphany
- GWV 1116/26: Lasset uns nicht schlafen (1726) – SATB, ob (2), str, bc – 5th Sunday after Epiphany
- GWV 1116/29: Wachet und betet (1729) – SATB, str, bc – 5th Sunday after Epiphany
- GWV 1116/34: Ihr Menschen wacht der Satan will (1734) – SATB, str, bc – 5th Sunday after Epiphany
- GWV 1116/37: Herr hast du nicht guten Samen (1737) – SATB, str, bc – 5th Sunday after Epiphany
- GWV 1116/40: Da Gott wollte Zorn erzeigen (1740) – SATB, (fl), ob (2), fg, vl, str, bc – 5th Sunday after Epiphany

=== GWV 1117 ===
- GWV 1117/13: Viel(e) sind berufen (1713) – SATB, ob (2), trb (3), str, bc – Septuagesima Sunday (9 weeks, 70 days before Easter)
- GWV 1117/16: Lauft und eilt (1716) – B, str, bc – Septuagesima Sunday (9 weeks, 70 days before Easter)
- GWV 1117/19: Ein jeglicher wie ihn der Herr berufen (1719) – SSTB, ob (2), fg, str, bc – Septuagesima Sunday (9 weeks, 70 days before Easter)
- GWV 1117/20: Müssiggehn bringt keine Krone (1720) – S, vl unis, bc – Septuagesima Sunday (9 weeks, 70 days before Easter)
- GWV 1117/21: Es ist genug dass wir (1721) – SATB, str, bc – Septuagesima Sunday (9 weeks, 70 days before Easter)
- GWV 1117/24: Wandelt wie sich's gebühret (1724) – SATB, str, bc – Septuagesima Sunday (9 weeks, 70 days before Easter)
- GWV 1117/27: Gott hat uns selig gemacht (1727) – SATB, str, bc – Septuagesima Sunday (9 weeks, 70 days before Easter)
- GWV 1117/28: Wandelt wie sich's gebühret (1728) – SAT, str, bc – Septuagesima Sunday (9 weeks, 70 days before Easter)
- GWV 1117/32: Lasset uns Gutes tun (1732) – ATB, str, bc – Septuagesima Sunday (9 weeks, 70 days before Easter)
- GWV 1117/34: Ringet danach dass ihr durch die enge Pforte (1734) – SATB, str, bc – Septuagesima Sunday (9 weeks, 70 days before Easter)
- GWV 1117/35: Du unerschaffnes höchstes Wesen (1735) – SATB, ob (2), fg, str, bc – Septuagesima Sunday (9 weeks, 70 days before Easter)
- GWV 1117/40: Befleissige dich Gott zu erzeigen (1740) – SATB, fg, str, bc – Septuagesima Sunday (9 weeks, 70 days before Easter)
- GWV 1117/41: Dein sind o Gott die Gaben (1741) – SATB, (ob), str, bc – Septuagesima Sunday (9 weeks, 70 days before Easter)
- GWV 1117/42: Der Vater ruft merkts doch (1742) – ATB, str, bc – Septuagesima Sunday (9 weeks, 70 days before Easter)
- GWV 1117/43: O Gott ich muss dir klagen (1743) – B, ob (2), str, bc – Septuagesima Sunday (9 weeks, 70 days before Easter)
- GWV 1117/44: Wie lange wollt ihr müssig stehen (1744) – SATB, str, bc – Septuagesima Sunday (9 weeks, 70 days before Easter)
- GWV 1117/46: Ach es geht mir wie einem (1746) – SATB, str, bc – Septuagesima Sunday (9 weeks, 70 days before Easter)
- GWV 1117/47: Viele die da sind die Ersten (1747) – SATB, str, bc – Septuagesima Sunday (9 weeks, 70 days before Easter)
- GWV 1117/53: Gott Zebaoth wende dich doch (1753) – SATB, fl (2), hn (2), str, bc – Septuagesima Sunday (9 weeks, 70 days before Easter)

=== GWV 1118 ===
- GWV 1118/12a: Mein Gott warum hast du mich verlassen (1712) – SSATB, str, bc – Sexagesima Sunday (8 weeks, 60 days before Easter)
- GWV 1118/12b: Mein Herz erquicket sich allein (1712) – S, str, bc – Sexagesima Sunday (8 weeks, 60 days before Easter)
- GWV 1118/15: Will ich rechte Freude spüren (1715) – S, ob (2), str, bc – Sexagesima Sunday (8 weeks, 60 days before Easter)
- GWV 1118/19: Wer Ohren hat zu hören der höre (1719) – SATB, str, bc – Sexagesima Sunday (8 weeks, 60 days before Easter)
- GWV 1118/20: Weg Ruhm weg Ehre der Welt (1720) – B, vl unis, bc – Sexagesima Sunday (8 weeks, 60 days before Easter)
- GWV 1118/23: Wir haben allenthalben Trübsal (1723) – SSTB, ob (2), str, bc – Sexagesima Sunday (8 weeks, 60 days before Easter)
- GWV 1118/26: Ermuntert euch ihr trägen Herzen (1726) – ATTB, fl (2), fg, str, bc – Sexagesima Sunday (8 weeks, 60 days before Easter)
- GWV 1118/28: Kommt lasst euch bauen (1728) – SAT, fl, ob, fg, str, bc – Sexagesima Sunday (8 weeks, 60 days before Easter)
- GWV 1118/29: O Mensch wie ist dein Herz bestellt (1729) – SATB, ob (2), fg, str, bc – Sexagesima Sunday (8 weeks, 60 days before Easter)
- GWV 1118/30: Besorge deines Herzens Feld (1730) – SATB, str, bc – Sexagesima Sunday (8 weeks, 60 days before Easter)
- GWV 1118/31: Das Gesetz des Herrn ist ohne Wandel (1731) – SATB, str, bc – Sexagesima Sunday (8 weeks, 60 days before Easter)
- GWV 1118/39: Das Wort der Predigt half (1739) – SATB, str, bc – Sexagesima Sunday (8 weeks, 60 days before Easter)
- GWV 1118/40: Hört Menschen hört (1740) – SATB, chal (3)stb, str, bc – Sexagesima Sunday (8 weeks, 60 days before Easter)
- GWV 1118/41: Bleibe in Gottes Wort und übe dich (1741) – SATB, str, bc – Sexagesima Sunday (8 weeks, 60 days before Easter)
- GWV 1118/42: Merkt Seelen was Jesus spricht (1742) – SATB, ob, chal (2)tb, str, bc – Sexagesima Sunday (8 weeks, 60 days before Easter)
- GWV 1118/43: Das Heil ist ferne von den Gottlosen (1743) – ATB, str, bc – Sexagesima Sunday (8 weeks, 60 days before Easter)
- GWV 1118/44: Die Rechte des Herrn (1744) – SATB, fg, str, bc – Sexagesima Sunday (8 weeks, 60 days before Easter)
- GWV 1118/46: Leget ab alle Unsauberkeit (1746) – SATB, str, bc – Sexagesima Sunday (8 weeks, 60 days before Easter)
- GWV 1118/47: Der Herr der Sämann ist geschäftig (1747) – SAB, str, bc – Sexagesima Sunday (8 weeks, 60 days before Easter)
- GWV 1118/48: Das Geheimnis des Herrn ist offenbaret (1748) – SATB, str, bc – Sexagesima Sunday (8 weeks, 60 days before Easter)
- GWV 1118/49: Wer Ohren hat zu hören ach der höre (1749) – ATB, str, bc – Sexagesima Sunday (8 weeks, 60 days before Easter)
- GWV 1118/50: Wer das Wort verachtet der verderbet (1750) – SATB, fl (2), hn (2), str, bc – Sexagesima Sunday (8 weeks, 60 days before Easter)
- GWV 1118/51: Des Menschen Sohn geht aus zu säen (1751) – SATB, str, bc – Sexagesima Sunday (8 weeks, 60 days before Easter)

=== GWV 1119 ===
- GWV 1119/12: Wenn ich mit Menschen- und mit Engelzungen (1712) – SSATB, str, bc – Quinquagesima Sunday (Estomihi)
- GWV 1119/13: Soll nun das unschuldsvolle Lamm (1713) – SB, ob, str, bc – Quinquagesima Sunday (Estomihi)
- GWV 1119/14: Du gehst o Jesu willig (1714) – TB, fl (2), ob, str, bc – Quinquagesima Sunday (Estomihi)
- GWV 1119/16: Nun aber bleibet Glaube (1716) – SSATB, fl/ob, str, bc – Quinquagesima Sunday (Estomihi)
- GWV 1119/19: Siehe ich komme im Buch ist von mir (1719) – SATB, str, bc – Quinquagesima Sunday (Estomihi)
- GWV 1119/21: Gedenket an den der ein solches Widersprechen (1721) – SATB, str, bc – Quinquagesima Sunday (Estomihi)
- GWV 1119/22: Kommt lasst uns mit Jesu gehen (1722) – B, str, bc – Quinquagesima Sunday (Estomihi)
- GWV 1119/23: Seid niemand nichts schuldig (1723) – SSTB, ob (2), str, bc – Quinquagesima Sunday (Estomihi)
- GWV 1119/24: Ein Lämmlein geht und trägt die Schuld (1724) – SATB, str, bc – Quinquagesima Sunday (Estomihi)
- GWV 1119/25: Fürwahr er trug unsre Krankheit (1725) – T, ob, str, bc – Quinquagesima Sunday (Estomihi)
- GWV 1119/27: Schweig Seele schweige aller Freuden (1727) – SATB, fl (2), ob (2), fg, str, bc – Quinquagesima Sunday (Estomihi)
- GWV 1119/28: Sehet wir gehen hinauf gen Jerusalem (1728) – SAT, str, bc – Quinquagesima Sunday (Estomihi)
- GWV 1119/31: Siehe ich komme im Buch ist von mir (1731) – SATB, str, bc – Quinquagesima Sunday (Estomihi)
- GWV 1119/32: Jesus geht der Welt zum Segen (1732) – ATB, (fl), vl, str, bc – Quinquagesima Sunday (Estomihi)
- GWV 1119/33: Die Furcht des Herrn ist Zucht zur Weisheit (1733) – SATB, fl (2), str, bc – Quinquagesima Sunday (Estomihi)
- GWV 1119/34: Jesus spricht von seinem Leiden (1734) – SATB, fl, str, bc – Quinquagesima Sunday (Estomihi)
- GWV 1119/35: Gott hat den der von keiner Sünde wusste (1735) – SATB, str, bc – Quinquagesima Sunday (Estomihi)
- GWV 1119/36: Der natürliche Mensch vernimmt nichts vom Geiste (1736) – SATB, str, bc – Quinquagesima Sunday (Estomihi)
- GWV 1119/37: Ach lass dich unsers Elends jammern (1737) – SATB, str, bc – Quinquagesima Sunday (Estomihi)
- GWV 1119/39: Wo gehet Jesus hin (1739) – SATB, str, bc – Quinquagesima Sunday (Estomihi)
- GWV 1119/40: Jesu meiner Seelen Licht (1740) – SATB, str, bc – Quinquagesima Sunday (Estomihi)
- GWV 1119/41: Kommt Seelen seid in Andacht stille - oT: Die Erbauliche Anschickung unsers Erlösers (1741) – SATB, ob (2), violetta (2), vla (2), str, bc – Quinquagesima Sunday (Estomihi)
- GWV 1119/42: Seht Gottes Lamm geht hin (1742) – SATB, ob, str, bc – Quinquagesima Sunday (Estomihi)
- GWV 1119/43: Ihr Freunde Jesu kommt herbei (1743) – ATB, ob, fg, str, bc – Quinquagesima Sunday (Estomihi)
- GWV 1119/44: Freuet euch dass ihr mit Christo leidet (1744) – SATB, str, bc – Quinquagesima Sunday (Estomihi)

=== GWV 1120 ===
- GWV 1120/18: Wohl dem dem die Übertretung (1718) – SSATB, ob, str, bc – Invocavit (1st Sunday in Lent)
- GWV 1120/19: Auf Christenmensch (1719) – SATB, str, bc – Invocavit (1st Sunday in Lent)
- GWV 1120/20: Süsser Trost erwünschte Stunde (1720) – S, vl unis, bc – Invocavit (1st Sunday in Lent)
- GWV 1120/26: Rüste dich mein Geist zum kämpfen (1726) – ATTB, fl (2), fg, str, bc – Invocavit (1st Sunday in Lent)
- GWV 1120/28: Wir wissen dass wer von Gott geboren ist (1728) – SAT, str, bc – Invocavit (1st Sunday in Lent)
- GWV 1120/30: Wir haben nicht einen Hohenpriester (1730) – SATB, str, bc – Invocavit (1st Sunday in Lent)
- GWV 1120/38: Dein Leben lang habe Gott vor Augen (1738) – SATB, str, bc – Invocavit (1st Sunday in Lent)
- GWV 1120/40: Wir die wir des Tages sind (1740) – SATB, str, bc – Invocavit (1st Sunday in Lent)
- GWV 1120/41: Erzittre toll und freche Welt – oT: Das Innerliche Leiden Jesu im Garten (1741) – SATB, (ob), fg, vl (2), str, bc – Invocavit (1st Sunday in Lent)
- GWV 1120/42: Der arge Feind der Fürst der Finsternis (1742) – SATB, clar, str, bc – Invocavit (1st Sunday in Lent)
- GWV 1120/43: Betrübte Sulamith geh hin - oT: Die Liebevolle Fürbitte Jesu für seine Feinde (1743) – ATB, ob, str, bc – Invocavit (1st Sunday in Lent)
- GWV 1120/44: Gott widerstehet den Hoffärtigen (1744) – SATB, str, bc – Invocavit (1st Sunday in Lent)
- GWV 1120/46: Da ward Jesus vom Geist (1746) – SATB, str, bc – Invocavit (1st Sunday in Lent)
- GWV 1120/47: Er selbst der Satan (1747) – SATB, str, bc – Invocavit (1st Sunday in Lent)
- GWV 1120/48: Wir haben nicht einen Hohenpriester (1748) – SATB, str, bc – Invocavit (1st Sunday in Lent)
- GWV 1120/49: Ergreifet den Harnisch Gottes (1749) – ATB, str, bc – Invocavit (1st Sunday in Lent)
- GWV 1120/50: Wer die Frommen verführet (1750) – SATB, str, bc – Invocavit (1st Sunday in Lent)
- GWV 1120/51: Wer unter dem Schirm des Höchsten (1751) – SATB, str, bc – Invocavit (1st Sunday in Lent)
- GWV 1120/53: Der Herr ist deine Zuversicht (1753) – SATB, fl (2), fg (2), hn (2), str, bc – Invocavit (1st Sunday in Lent)

=== GWV 1121 ===
- GWV 1121/12a: Verbannt sei dies' verfluchte Wesen (1712) – SATB, ob (2), str, bc – Reminiscere (2nd Sunday in Lent)
- GWV 1121/12b: Der Trost ist aus die Hilfe ist dahin (1712) – S, vl unis, bc – Reminiscere (2nd Sunday in Lent)
- GWV 1121/13: Gott hat sein Angesicht verborgen (1713) – B, ob (2), str, bc – Reminiscere (2nd Sunday in Lent)
- GWV 1121/14: Gott will mich auch probieren (1714) – SATB, ob (2), str, bc – Reminiscere (2nd Sunday in Lent)
- GWV 1121/16: Sehet zu dass ihr vorsichtig wandelt (1716) – SSATB, ob/org, str, bc – Reminiscere (2nd Sunday in Lent)
- GWV 1121/19: Warum verstössest du Herr meine Seele (1719) – SATB, str, bc – Reminiscere (2nd Sunday in Lent)
- GWV 1121/21: Herr warum trittest du so ferne (1721) – SAT, str, bc – Reminiscere (2nd Sunday in Lent)
- GWV 1121/22: Halte an am Glaubensstreit (1722) – B, str, bc – Reminiscere (2nd Sunday in Lent)
- GWV 1121/23: Wir ermahnen euch liebe Brüder (1723) – SSTB, str, bc – Reminiscere (2nd Sunday in Lent)
- GWV 1121/24: Seid fröhlich in Hoffnung (1724) – SATTB, str, bc – Reminiscere (2nd Sunday in Lent)
- GWV 1121/25: Ach Davids Sohn du Trost (1725) – SATB, str, bc – Reminiscere (2nd Sunday in Lent)
- GWV 1121/27: Wisset dass euer Glaube (1727) – SATB, fl (2), ob (2), str, bc – Reminiscere (2nd Sunday in Lent)
- GWV 1121/28: Gott ist getreu (1728) – SAT, str, bc – Reminiscere (2nd Sunday in Lent)
- GWV 1121/29: Ach Jesu teure Rettungsquelle (1729) – SATB, (ob), str, bc – Reminiscere (2nd Sunday in Lent)
- GWV 1121/31: Herr wie lange willst du mein so gar vergessen (1731) – SATB, str, bc – Reminiscere (2nd Sunday in Lent)
- GWV 1121/32: Führ uns Herr in Versuchung nicht (1732) – SATB, str, bc – Reminiscere (2nd Sunday in Lent)
- GWV 1121/33: Die Hoffnung die sich verzeucht (1733) – SATB, str, bc – Reminiscere (2nd Sunday in Lent)
- GWV 1121/34: Dennoch bleib ich stets an dir (1734) – SAB, str, bc – Reminiscere (2nd Sunday in Lent)
- GWV 1121/35: Schaue Jesus meine Not (1735) – SATB, str, bc – Reminiscere (2nd Sunday in Lent)
- GWV 1121/36: Ich wage mich an Gott (1736) – SATB, str, bc – Reminiscere (2nd Sunday in Lent)
- GWV 1121/37: Mich hungert Herr nach deiner Gnade (1737) – SATB, str, bc – Reminiscere (2nd Sunday in Lent)
- GWV 1121/39: Verdamme mich nicht (1739) – SATBB, chals, str, bc – Reminiscere (2nd Sunday in Lent)
- GWV 1121/40: Alle Dinge sind möglich (1740) – SATTB, str, bc – Reminiscere (2nd Sunday in Lent)
- GWV 1121/41: Christus der uns selig macht - oT: Das Äusserliche Leiden des Heilands im Garten (1741) – SATB, chals, str, bc – Reminiscere (2nd Sunday in Lent)
- GWV 1121/42: O mein Gott für den ich trete (1742) – SATB, ob, fg, str, bc – Reminiscere (2nd Sunday in Lent)
- GWV 1121/43: Betrübte Seele merke auf - oT: Der Erfreuliche Trost für den bussfertigen Schacher (1743) – ATB, vl (2), str, bc – Reminiscere (2nd Sunday in Lent)
- GWV 1121/44: Wir wissen dass Trübsal Geduld bringet (1744) – SATB, str, bc – Reminiscere (2nd Sunday in Lent)

=== GWV 1122 ===
- GWV 1122/18: Gott sei mir gnädig nach deiner Güte (1718) – SSATB, str, bc – Oculi (3rd Sunday in Lent)
- GWV 1122/19: Wir haben nicht mit Fleisch und Blut zu kämpfen (1719) – SATB, str, bc – Oculi (3rd Sunday in Lent)
- GWV 1122/20: Ich folge Jesu deinen Tritten (1720) – B, vl unis, bc – Oculi (3rd Sunday in Lent)
- GWV 1122/26: Führ uns Herr in Versuchung nicht (1726) – SATB, fl (2), fg, str, bc – Oculi (3rd Sunday in Lent)
- GWV 1122/28: Ach Jesu Satans Überwinder (1728) – SAT, str, bc – Oculi (3rd Sunday in Lent)
- GWV 1122/29: Nun ist das Heil und die Kraft (1729) – ATB, fl (2), clar, str, bc – Oculi (3rd Sunday in Lent)
- GWV 1122/30: Wehe denen die auf Erden wohnen (1730) – SATB, fg, str, bc – Oculi (3rd Sunday in Lent)
- GWV 1122/34: Gottlob der Satan ist geschlagen (1734) – SATB, str, bc – Oculi (3rd Sunday in Lent)
- GWV 1122/38: Ein guter Mensch bringt Gutes hervor (1738) – SATB, str, bc – Oculi (3rd Sunday in Lent)
- GWV 1122/40: So sich jemand unter euch lässet dünken (1740) – SATB, chals, str, bc – Oculi (3rd Sunday in Lent)
- GWV 1122/41: Freund warum bist du kommen – oT: Das Leiden Jesu von seinen Freunden (1741) – SATB, str, bc – Oculi (3rd Sunday in Lent)
- GWV 1122/42: Wie elend sind ach arme Menschen dran (1742) – SATB, str, bc – Oculi (3rd Sunday in Lent)
- GWV 1122/43: Wo blickst du hin o Seelenfreund - oT: Die Treue Vorsorge des sterbenden Jesu für seine betrübte Mutter (1743) – SATB, str, bc – Oculi (3rd Sunday in Lent)
- GWV 1122/44: Führet einen guten Wandel (1744) – SATB, str, bc – Oculi (3rd Sunday in Lent)
- GWV 1122/46: Die Sünd' hat uns verderbet sehr (1746) – SATB, str, bc – Oculi (3rd Sunday in Lent)
- GWV 1122/47: Bind an der Teufel ist bald hin (1747) – SATB, fg, str, bc – Oculi (3rd Sunday in Lent)
- GWV 1122/48: Der Herr ist treu (1748) – SATB, str, bc – Oculi (3rd Sunday in Lent)
- GWV 1122/50: Behüte dein Herz mit allem Fleiss (1750) – SATB, str, bc – Oculi (3rd Sunday in Lent)
- GWV 1122/51: Mache dich auf Gott (1751) – SATB, hn (2), str, bc – Oculi (3rd Sunday in Lent)
- GWV 1122/53: Ach Gott wie lange soll der Widerwärtige (1753) – SATB, fl (2), fg (2), hn (2), str, bc – Oculi (3rd Sunday in Lent)

=== GWV 1123 ===
- GWV 1123/12: Fleisch und Geist stimmt nicht zusammen (1712) – SATB, org, ob, fg, str, bc – Laetare (4th Sunday in Lent)
- GWV 1123/13: Gott und genug sind solche Schätze (1713) – S, ob (2), str, bc – Laetare (4th Sunday in Lent)
- GWV 1123/15: Herr ich leide Not Herr lindre mirs (1715) – SATB, ob (2), str, bc – Laetare (4th Sunday in Lent)
- GWV 1123/16: Christus ist des Gesetzes Ende (1716) – SSAB, str, bc – Laetare (4th Sunday in Lent)
- GWV 1123/18: Herr höre mein Gebet (1718) – S, ob am, str, bc – Laetare (4th Sunday in Lent)
- GWV 1123/21: Die den Herrn suchen (1721) – SSTB, str, bc – Laetare (4th Sunday in Lent)
- GWV 1123/22: Alle Fülle aller Segen (1722) – SSATB, ob, str, bc – Laetare (4th Sunday in Lent)
- GWV 1123/23: So besteht nun in der Freiheit (1723) – SSTB, str, bc – Laetare (4th Sunday in Lent)
- GWV 1123/24: Jesus sorget für die Frommen (1724) – SATB, str, bc – Laetare (4th Sunday in Lent)
- GWV 1123/25: Der Herr ist Sonne und Schild (1725) – SSTB, str, bc – Laetare (4th Sunday in Lent)
- GWV 1123/26: Die Gottseligkeit ist zu allen Dingen nütz (1726) – SATB, fl (2), fg, str, bc – Laetare (4th Sunday in Lent)
- GWV 1123/27: Trachtet am ersten nach dem Reiche Gottes (1727) – SATB, str, bc – Laetare (4th Sunday in Lent)
- GWV 1123/28: Wer Gott vertraut hat wohl gebaut (1728) – SAT, fl (2), ob(2), fg, str, bc – Laetare (4th Sunday in Lent)
- GWV 1123/29: Einen Propheten wie mich (1729) – SATB, fg, str, bc – Laetare (4th Sunday in Lent)
- GWV 1123/31: Wirf dein Anliegen auf den Herrn (1731) – SATB, str, bc – Laetare (4th Sunday in Lent)
- GWV 1123/32: Gottes Wort und Jesum lieben (1732) – SATB, str, bc – Laetare (4th Sunday in Lent)
- GWV 1123/33: Zweierlei bitt' ich von dir (1733) – SATB, str, bc – Laetare (4th Sunday in Lent)
- GWV 1123/35: Der Herr ist gross in seinen Werken (1735) – SATB, str, bc – Laetare (4th Sunday in Lent)
- GWV 1123/36: Befiehl dem Herrn deine Wege (1736) – SATB, str, bc – Laetare (4th Sunday in Lent)
- GWV 1123/39: Jesus ging hinauf auf einen Berg (1739) – SATBB, str, bc – Laetare (4th Sunday in Lent)
- GWV 1123/40: Der Herr wird euch in Trübsal (1740) – SATB, str, bc – Laetare (4th Sunday in Lent)
- GWV 1123/41: Die Gewaltigen raten – oT: Das Leiden Jesu vor dem Geist und weltlichen Gericht (1741) – SATB, ob (am)(2), fg, vl, str, bc – Laetare (4th Sunday in Lent)
- GWV 1123/42: Es stehen Jesus Augen offen (1742) – SATB, str, bc – Laetare (4th Sunday in Lent)
- GWV 1123/43: Mein Gott warum hast du mich verlassen - oT: Das Klägliche Angstgeschrei des gekreuzigten Heilands (1743) – ATB, ob, chal (2)tb, str, bc – Laetare (4th Sunday in Lent)
- GWV 1123/44: Aus Gottes reichen Allmachtshänden (1744) – SATB, str, bc – Laetare (4th Sunday in Lent)
- GWV 1123/46: Siehe des Herrn Auge (1746) – SATB, str, bc – Laetare (4th Sunday in Lent)
- GWV 1123/49: Wo Jesus wohnt ist lauter Segen (1749) – ATB, str, bc – Laetare (4th Sunday in Lent)

=== GWV 1124 ===
- GWV 1124/20: Jesu edler Hoherpriester (1720) – B, ob (2), fg, str, bc – Judica (5th Sunday in Lent)
- GWV 1124/24: Wer eine Grube machet (1724) – SATB, fl, str, bc – Judica (5th Sunday in Lent)
- GWV 1124/27: Wer von Gott ist (1727) – SATB, fl (2), str, bc – Judica (5th Sunday in Lent)
- GWV 1124/28: Unser Trost ist der dass wir ein gut Gewissen (1728) – SATB, fl (2), ob (2), fg, str, bc – Judica (5th Sunday in Lent)
- GWV 1124/32: Der Gottlose dräuet dem Gerechten (1732) – SAT, vl, str, bc – Judica (5th Sunday in Lent)
- GWV 1124/34: Es spricht der Unweisen Mund wohl (1734) – SATBB, fl/ob, str, bc – Judica (5th Sunday in Lent)
- GWV 1124/35: O Mensch verachtest du den Reichtum (1735) – SATB, str, bc – Judica (5th Sunday in Lent)
- GWV 1124/37: Ach Gott vom Himmel sieh darein (1737) – SATB, chal (2)tb, str, bc – Judica (5th Sunday in Lent)
- GWV 1124/38: Ich habe mir vorgesetzt (1738) – SATBB, str, bc – Judica (5th Sunday in Lent)
- GWV 1124/40: Selig seid ihr wenn euch die Menschen (1740) – SATB, str, bc – Judica (5th Sunday in Lent)
- GWV 1124/41: Sie rüsten sich wider die Seele - oT: Die Ungerechte Verdammung des gerechten Heilandes (1741) – SATB, ob (2), fg, vl (2), str, bc – Judica (5th Sunday in Lent)
- GWV 1124/42: Seht Jesus sucht das Heil der Seelen (1742) – SATB, str, bc – Judica (5th Sunday in Lent)
- GWV 1124/43: Wen da dürstet der komme zu mir - oT: Der Schmerzliche Durst (1743) – SATB, str, bc – Judica (5th Sunday in Lent)
- GWV 1124/44: Die Wahrheit findet keinen Glauben (1744) – SATB, chal (2)tb, str, bc – Judica (5th Sunday in Lent)
- GWV 1124/47: Im Anfang war das Wort (1747) – SATB, str, bc – Judica (5th Sunday in Lent)
- GWV 1124/50: Wer den Spötter züchtiget (1750) – SATB, hn (2), str, bc – Judica (5th Sunday in Lent)
- GWV 1124/53: Wo der Herr nicht bei uns wäre (1753) – SATB, str, bc – Judica (5th Sunday in Lent)

=== GWV 1125 ===
- GWV 1125/13: Jesus stirbt ach soll ich leben (1713) – SSATB, str, bc – Palm Sunday
- GWV 1125/15: Jesus geht mit allen Freuden (1715) – SATB, ob, str, bc – Palm Sunday
- GWV 1125/18: Erhöre Herr mein ächzend Flehen (1718) – SATB, ob, str, bc – Palm Sunday
- GWV 1125/19: Ach dass die Hülfe aus Zion über Israel käme (1719) – SATB, ob (2), str, bc – Palm Sunday
- GWV 1125/23: So demütiget euch nun (1723) – SSTB, ob, vla d'am, str, bc – Palm Sunday
- GWV 1125/25: Es jauchze alle Welt (1725) – SSTB, hn (2), str, bc – Palm Sunday
- GWV 1125/26: Gott hat den der von keiner Sünde wusste (1726) – SATB, fl (2), ob (2), fg, str, bc – Palm Sunday
- GWV 1125/29: Jerusalem sieh deinen König an (1729) – SATB, fl, (ob), str, bc – Palm Sunday
- GWV 1125/31: Gott gib dein Gericht dem Könige (1731) – SATB, str, bc – Palm Sunday
- GWV 1125/36: Jesu Leiden Pein und Tod (1736) – SATB, ob (am) (2), viol(ett)a (2), str, bc – Palm Sunday
- GWV 1125/38: Neige deine Ohren mein Gott (1738) – SATBB, ob, chal (2)ab, str, bc – Palm Sunday
- GWV 1125/39: Suchet den Herrn alle ihr Elenden (1739) – AATTBB, ob (2), fg, chals, vla (2), str, bc – Palm Sunday
- GWV 1125/40: Herr deine Augen sehen nach dem Glauben (1740) – SATB, ob (2), vl (2), str, bc – Palm Sunday
- GWV 1125/41: Fürwahr er trug unsre Krankheit – oT: Das Leiden Jesu in der schmerzlichen Geisselung (1741) – SATB, ob/fl, chal (3)stb, fg, str, bc – Palm Sunday
- GWV 1125/42: Ihr Sünder schickt euch an (1742) – SATB, ob (2), fg, clar, vl, str, bc – Palm Sunday
- GWV 1125/43: Kehre wieder du abtrünnige Israel (1743) – SATB, fg, vl, str, bc – Palm Sunday
- GWV 1125/44: Suchet den Herrn alle ihr Elenden (1744) – SATB, hn (2), timp (4), str, bc – Palm Sunday
- GWV 1125/46: Zerreisset eure Herzen (1746) – SATB, str, bc – Palm Sunday
- GWV 1125/48: Blaset mit der Posaune zu Zion (1748) – SATB, hn (2), str, bc – Palm Sunday
- GWV 1125/49: Israel vergiss mein nicht (1749) – SATB, str, bc – Palm Sunday
- GWV 1125/50: Der Gottlose bestehet nicht (1750) – SATB, hn (2), str, bc – Palm Sunday

=== GWV 1126 ===
- GWV 1126/16: Esset meine Lieben und trinket (1716) – SATB, str, bc – Maundy Thursday
- GWV 1126/21: Ein jeglicher sei gesinnet (1721) – SSB, str, bc – Maundy Thursday
- GWV 1126/22: Jesus gibt sich selbst zu essen (1722) – SSATB, str, bc – Maundy Thursday
- GWV 1126/24: Ihr Gedanken kommt zusammen (1724) – SATB, str, bc – Maundy Thursday
- GWV 1126/28: Der Herr lässet sein Heil verkündigen (1728) – SATB, str, bc – Maundy Thursday
- GWV 1126/32: Weicht ihr eitlen Gedanken (1732) – SATB, str, bc – Maundy Thursday
- GWV 1126/33: Die Frucht des Gerechten ist ein Baum (1733) – ATB, str, bc – Maundy Thursday
- GWV 1126/34: Ach Jesus' Stunde ist gekommen (1734) – SATB, str, bc – Maundy Thursday
- GWV 1126/35: Meine Lieben wir sind nun Gottes Kinder (1735) – SATB, str, bc – Maundy Thursday
- GWV 1126/37: Kommt Seelen stellt euch ein (1737) – SATB, str, bc – Maundy Thursday
- GWV 1126/39: Da Jesus erkennete (1739) – SATB, ob (2), chal (3)atb, str, bc – Maundy Thursday
- GWV 1126/40: Ihr Pharisäer dieser Zeit (1740) – SATB, ob (2), fg, str, bc – Maundy Thursday
- GWV 1126/41: Jesus auf das er heiligte das Volk – oT: Das Leiden Jesu auf Golgatha (1741) – SATB, (fl), ob (3), fg, violetta (2), str, bc – Maundy Thursday
- GWV 1126/42: Ich komme jetzt als ein armer Gast (1742) – ATB, str, bc – Maundy Thursday
- GWV 1126/43: Es ist vollbracht - oT: Die Erfreuliche Versicherung von der gesegneten Vollendung der Leiden Jesu (1743) – SATB, str, bc – Maundy Thursday
- GWV 1126/45: Ihr die ihr ohne Liebe lebt (1745) – ATB, str, bc – Maundy Thursday
- GWV 1126/47: Der gesegnete Kelch (1747) – ATB, str, bc – Maundy Thursday

=== GWV 1127 ===
- GWV 1127/14: O Schmerz o Leid mein Jesus (1714) – STB, str, bc – Good Friday
- GWV 1127/16: Sehet welch ein Mensch (1716) – S, fg, str, bc – Good Friday
- GWV 1127/18: Christus hat uns erlöset (1718) – SATB, ob, str, bc – Good Friday
- GWV 1127/19: O Welt sieh hier dein Leben (1719) – SATB, str, bc – Good Friday
- GWV 1127/20: Zerfliess mein Herz in Blut (1720) – SSB, str, bc – Good Friday
- GWV 1127/25: Eröffnet euch ihr Augenquellen (1725) – SSATB, str, bc – Good Friday
- GWV 1127/26: Wisset ihr nicht dass auf diesen Tag (1726) – SATB, fl (2), ob (2), fg, clar (2), timp (2), vl, vla am, str, bc – Good Friday
- GWV 1127/29: Seid elend und traget Leid (1729) – (S)ATB, str, bc – Good Friday
- GWV 1127/30: Betrübter Tag in Zion tönen (1730) – SATB, fl am, ob am, str, bc – Good Friday
- GWV 1127/31: Mein Gott warum hast du mich verlassen (1731) – SATB, str, bc – Good Friday
- GWV 1127/36: Der Fürst des Lebens stirbt (1736) – SSATB, fl, chal (2), str, bc – Good Friday
- GWV 1127/38: Ach stirb mein Herz (1738) – SATB, ob am (2), str, bc – Good Friday
- GWV 1127/40: Nun gibt mein Jesus gute Nacht (1740) – SATB, chal (3)stb, fg, vl, str, bc – Good Friday
- GWV 1127/41: Nun ist alles wohl gemacht – oT: Die Gesegnete Vollendung der Leiden Jesu (1741) – SATB, fl (2), ob (2), fg, str, bc – Good Friday
- GWV 1127/42: Mein Heiland neigt sein Haupt (1742) – SATB, ob (2), fg, str, bc – Good Friday
- GWV 1127/43: Vater ich befehle meinen Geist - oT: Des sterbenden Heilands erbauliches Sterbgebet (1743) – SATB, chal (2)tb, str, bc – Good Friday
- GWV 1127/44: Ist dieser nicht des Menschen Sohn (1744) – SATB, str, bc – Good Friday
- GWV 1127/46: O Jammerblick die Lebenssonne (1746) – SATB, str, bc – Good Friday
- GWV 1127/48: O Traurigkeit o Herzeleid (1748) – SATB, str, bc – Good Friday
- GWV 1127/49: Betrübter Tag vor allen Tagen (1749) – SATB, fl (2), str, bc – Good Friday
- GWV 1127/50: Es sind Gerechte denen gehet es (1750) – SATB, str, bc – Good Friday

=== GWV 1128 ===
- GWV 1128/12: Lasset uns Ostern halten (1712) – SSATB, ob (2), fg, clar (2), timp (2), str, bc – Easter Sunday
- GWV 1128/21: Nun ist auferstanden (1721) – SSB, ob (2), str, bc – Easter Sunday
- GWV 1128/22: Zions Held hat überwunden (1722) – SSATB, clar (2), timp (2), str, bc – Easter Sunday
- GWV 1128/23: Wir haben auch ein Osterlamm (1723) – SATB, ob (3), clar (2), timp (2), str, bc – Easter Sunday
- GWV 1128/24: Erschrocknes Zion sei erfreut (1724) – SATB, vla am (?), clar (2), timp (2), str, bc – Easter Sunday
- GWV 1128/27: Der Tod ist verschlungen in den Sieg (1727) – SATB, fl (2), ob (2), clar (2), timp (2), str, bc – Easter Sunday
- GWV 1128/28: Frohlocke werte Christenheit (1728) – SATB, fl (2), fg, clar (2), timp (2), str, bc – Easter Sunday
- GWV 1128/32: Den Fürsten des Lebens habt ihr getötet (1732) – SATB, fl (2), clar (2), timp (2), str, bc – Easter Sunday
- GWV 1128/33: Der Herr geht aus des Grabes Banden (1733) – SATB, fl, hn (2), str, bc – Easter Sunday
- GWV 1128/34: Dies ist der Tag den der Herr machet (1734) – SATB, fl, (ob), clar (2), timp (2), str, bc – Easter Sunday
- GWV 1128/35: Freude Freude über Freude (1735) – SSATB, chal (2)tb, hn (2), timp (2), str, bc – Easter Sunday
- GWV 1128/37: Dem Gerechten muss das Licht immer wieder aufgehen (1737) – SATB, fl (2), chal (2)tb, fg, clar (2), timp (2), str, bc – Easter Sunday
- GWV 1128/39: Jesus lebt sagt es an (1739) – AATTBB, ob (2), fg, clar (2), timp (2), str, bc – Easter Sunday
- GWV 1128/40: Weg Trauern weg Weinen (1740) – SATB, ob (2), chals, clar (2), timp (2), str, bc – Easter Sunday
- GWV 1128/41: Hallelujah Jesus lebt (1741) – SATB, ob (2), fg, clar (2), timp (2), str, bc – Easter Sunday
- GWV 1128/42: Erfreut euch schüchterne Gemüter (1742) – SATB, ob (2), clar (2), timp (2), str, bc – Easter Sunday
- GWV 1128/43: Der Sieg ist da (1743) – SATB, str, bc – Easter Sunday
- GWV 1128/44: Jesus lebt sagt es an (1744) – SATB, (ob), hn (2), timp (2), str, bc – Easter Sunday
- GWV 1128/45: Lasset uns Ostern halten (1745) – ATB, clar (2), str, bc – Easter Sunday
- GWV 1128/47: Was sucht ihr den Lebendigen bei den Toten (1747) – ATB, chal (2)tb, hn (2), clar (2), timp (4), str, bc – Easter Sunday
- GWV 1128/53: Man singet mit Freuden vom Siege (1753) – SATB, hn (2), clar (2), timp (4), str, bc – Easter Sunday

=== GWV 1129 ===
- GWV 1129/13: O Schmerz das Leben ist gestorben (1713) – ATB, str, bc – 2nd day of Easter (Easter Monday)
- GWV 1129/14: Mein Jesus nahe doch zu mir (1714) – SB, ob, str, bc – 2nd day of Easter (Easter Monday)
- GWV 1129/15: Heut triumphieret Gottes Sohn (1715) – SSSATB, clar (2), timp (2), str, bc – 2nd day of Easter (Easter Monday), on the "Heut triumphieret Gottes Sohn" hymn by Bartholomäus Gesius
- GWV 1129/16: Gott hat ein liebes Werk getan (1716) – S, ob (2), str, bc – 2nd day of Easter (Easter Monday)
- GWV 1129/18: Ermuntre dich betrübter Geist (1718) – SSATB, str, bc – 2nd day of Easter (Easter Monday)
- GWV 1129/19: Ihr werdet traurig sein (1719) – SATB, str, bc – 2nd day of Easter (Easter Monday)
- GWV 1129/20: Zage nicht verirrte Seele (1720) – B, str, bc – 2nd day of Easter (Easter Monday)
- GWV 1129/25: Dem Gerechten muss das Licht immer wieder aufgehen (1725) – SSATB, ob, clar (2), timp (2), str, bc – 2nd day of Easter (Easter Monday)
- GWV 1129/26: Der Herr ist nahe bei denen (1726) – SATB, ob (2), str, bc – 2nd day of Easter (Easter Monday)
- GWV 1129/27: Wo zween oder drei versammelt sind (1727) – SATB, str, bc – 2nd day of Easter (Easter Monday)
- GWV 1129/29: Herr wohin sollen wir gehen (1729) – SATB, fl/ob, str, bc – 2nd day of Easter (Easter Monday)
- GWV 1129/30: Hoffen wir allein in diesem Leben (1730) – SATB, fl am, ob am, str, bc – 2nd day of Easter (Easter Monday)
- GWV 1129/31: Ich hatte viele Bekümmernisse (1731) – SATB, str, bc – 2nd day of Easter (Easter Monday)
- GWV 1129/36: Der Herr ist wahrhaftig auferstanden (1736) – SSATB, fl (2), str, bc – 2nd day of Easter (Easter Monday)
- GWV 1129/40: Wo hast du dich mein Freund (1740) – SATTB, vl, str, bc – 2nd day of Easter (Easter Monday)
- GWV 1129/41: Die Welt wird sich freuen (1741) – SATB, str, bc – 2nd day of Easter (Easter Monday)
- GWV 1129/42: Ach Seelenfreund wo bist du hingegangen (1742) – SATB, str, bc – 2nd day of Easter (Easter Monday)
- GWV 1129/43: Verfallnes Salem gute Nacht (1743) – SATB, str, bc – 2nd day of Easter (Easter Monday)
- GWV 1129/44: Die Wege des Herrn sind eitel Güte (1744) – SATB, (ob), str, bc – 2nd day of Easter (Easter Monday)
- GWV 1129/46: Ach bleib bei uns Herr Jesu Christ (1746) – SATB, chal (2)tb, fg, str, bc – 2nd day of Easter (Easter Monday)
- GWV 1129/48: O ihr Toren und trägen Herzens (1748) – SATB, str, bc – 2nd day of Easter (Easter Monday)
- GWV 1129/49: Ach wo soll ich Jesum finden (1749) – SATB, str, bc – 2nd day of Easter (Easter Monday)
- GWV 1129/50: Dein Herz folge nicht den Sündern (1750) – SATB, (fl (2)), hn (2), str, bc – 2nd day of Easter (Easter Monday)

=== GWV 1130 ===
- GWV 1130/12: Ich wickle mich in deine Wunden (1712) – SSSATB, str, bc – 3rd day of Easter (Easter Tuesday)
- GWV 1130/21: Christ lag in Todesbanden (1721) – SSB, fl, str, bc – 3rd day of Easter (Easter Tuesday)
- GWV 1130/22: Jesus kündigt Frieden an (1722) – SSATB, ob (2), fg, str, bc – 3rd day of Easter (Easter Tuesday)
- GWV 1130/24: Der Herr wird seinem Volk Kraft geben (1724) – SATB, str, bc – 3rd day of Easter (Easter Tuesday)
- GWV 1130/28: Der Friede Gottes welcher höher ist (1728) – SATB, str, bc – 3rd day of Easter (Easter Tuesday)
- GWV 1130/32: Der Herr ist siegreich auferstanden (1732) – SATB, fl (2), str, bc – 3rd day of Easter (Easter Tuesday)
- GWV 1130/34: Jesus meine Zuversicht (1734) – SATB, str, bc – 3rd day of Easter (Easter Tuesday)
- GWV 1130/35: Also ists geschrieben (1735) – SATB, str, bc – 3rd day of Easter (Easter Tuesday)
- GWV 1130/37: Ich habe euch zuvorderst gegeben (1737) – SATB, fl, (ob), fg, vc, str, bc – 3rd day of Easter (Easter Tuesday)
- GWV 1130/39: Wir verkündigen euch die Verheissung (1739) – SATB, vl (2), str, bc – 3rd day of Easter (Easter Tuesday)
- GWV 1130/40: Der Gott unsrer Väter hat Jesum (1740) – SATB, fl/violetta, str, bc – 3rd day of Easter (Easter Tuesday)
- GWV 1130/41: Jesus meine Zuversicht (1741) – SATB, str, bc – 3rd day of Easter (Easter Tuesday)
- GWV 1130/42: Ich hab' in Jesu Trost und Wonne (1742) – SATB, ob (2), str, bc – 3rd day of Easter (Easter Tuesday)
- GWV 1130/45: Schmecket und sehet wie freundlich der Herr ist (1745) – ATB, str, bc – 3rd day of Easter (Easter Tuesday)
- GWV 1130/47: Also ists geschrieben (1747) – ATB, str, bc – 3rd day of Easter (Easter Tuesday)
- GWV 1130/50: Verlass dich auf den Herrn (1750) – ATB, str, bc – 3rd day of Easter (Easter Tuesday)
- GWV 1130/52: Der Herr ist wahrhaftig auferstanden (1752) – SATB, str, bc – 3rd day of Easter (Easter Tuesday)

=== GWV 1131 ===
- GWV 1131/13: Mich umringet Angst und Weh (1713) – S, ob (2), str, bc – Quasimodogeniti (1st Sunday after Easter)
- GWV 1131/16: Gute Nacht o Wesen (1716) – SATB, vl (2), str, bc – Quasimodogeniti (1st Sunday after Easter)
- GWV 1131/18: Gleichwie mich der Vater gesandt hat (1718) – B, str, bc – Quasimodogeniti (1st Sunday after Easter)
- GWV 1131/19: Der Friede Gottes welcher höher ist (1719) – SATB, str, bc – Quasimodogeniti (1st Sunday after Easter)
- GWV 1131/20: Ich bin in Jesu fest gegründet (1720) – SB, str, bc – Quasimodogeniti (1st Sunday after Easter)
- GWV 1131/24: Herr Gott Zebaoth (1724) – SATB, str, bc – Quasimodogeniti (1st Sunday after Easter)
- GWV 1131/25: Wirf dein Anliegen auf den Herrn (1725) – SATB, str, bc – Quasimodogeniti (1st Sunday after Easter)
- GWV 1131/26: Das Reich Gottes ist nicht Essen und Trinken (1726) – SATB, fl (2), fg, str, bc – Quasimodogeniti (1st Sunday after Easter)
- GWV 1131/27: Treuer Gott ich muss dir klagen (1727) – SATB, str, bc – Quasimodogeniti (1st Sunday after Easter)
- GWV 1131/28: Der Herr erhält alle die da fallen (1728) – SATB, str, bc – Quasimodogeniti (1st Sunday after Easter)
- GWV 1131/29: Ich lieg' im Streit und wiederstreb' (1729) – SATB, str, bc – Quasimodogeniti (1st Sunday after Easter)
- GWV 1131/31: Der Herr wird seinem Volk Kraft geben (1731) – SATB, str, bc – Quasimodogeniti (1st Sunday after Easter)
- GWV 1131/36: Welchen ihr die Sünde erlasset (1736) – SATB, str, bc – Quasimodogeniti (1st Sunday after Easter)
- GWV 1131/38: Wir die wir stark sind (1738) – SATB, str, bc – Quasimodogeniti (1st Sunday after Easter)
- GWV 1131/40: Freue dich herzlich (1740) – SATB, str, bc – Quasimodogeniti (1st Sunday after Easter)
- GWV 1131/42: Erschrockne Herde fasse dich (1742) – SATB, str, bc – Quasimodogeniti (1st Sunday after Easter)
- GWV 1131/43: Ach Herr ach Heiland hilf (1743) – SAB, str, bc – Quasimodogeniti (1st Sunday after Easter)
- GWV 1131/44: In Jesu hab ich Trost und Frieden (1744) – S, str, bc – Quasimodogeniti (1st Sunday after Easter)
- GWV 1131/46: Die kleine Herde lebt in Schrecken (1746) – SATB, str, bc – Quasimodogeniti (1st Sunday after Easter)
- GWV 1131/47: Der Friede Gottes welcher höher ist (1747) – ATB, str, bc – Quasimodogeniti (1st Sunday after Easter)
- GWV 1131/48: Saget den verzagten Herzen (1748) – SATB, str, bc – Quasimodogeniti (1st Sunday after Easter)
- GWV 1131/49: Das Reich Gottes ist nicht Essen und Trinken (1749) – ATB, str, bc – Quasimodogeniti (1st Sunday after Easter)
- GWV 1131/50: Der Herr gibt Weisheit (1750) – SATB, str, bc – Quasimodogeniti (1st Sunday after Easter)

=== GWV 1132 ===
- GWV 1132/12a: Ich irre noch in Sündenwegen (1712) – SSATB, ob (2), str, bc – Misericordas Domini (2nd Sunday after Easter)
- GWV 1132/12b: Schmeichelt nur ihr Weltsirenen (1712) – S, (fl (2)), str, bc – Misericordas Domini (2nd Sunday after Easter)
- GWV 1132/21: Niemand hat grössere Liebe (1721) – SSTB, ob (2), str, bc – Misericordas Domini (2nd Sunday after Easter)
- GWV 1132/22: Jesus führt uns selbst zur Weide (1722) – SSATB, hn, str, bc – Misericordas Domini (2nd Sunday after Easter)
- GWV 1132/24: O du Hirte meiner Seele (1724) – SATB, str, bc – Misericordas Domini (2nd Sunday after Easter)
- GWV 1132/25: Guter Hirte frommer Herden (1725) – SATB, str, bc – Misericordas Domini (2nd Sunday after Easter)
- GWV 1132/32: Der grosse Hirt stirbt für die Herde (1732) – SATB, str, bc – Misericordas Domini (2nd Sunday after Easter)
- GWV 1132/33: Wenn die Gerechten überhand nehmen (1733) – SATB, str, bc – Misericordas Domini (2nd Sunday after Easter)
- GWV 1132/34: Ihr heiligen Brüder (1734) – SATB, fl (2), str, bc – Misericordas Domini (2nd Sunday after Easter)
- GWV 1132/35: Der Herr ist Hirt (1735) – SATB, str, bc – Misericordas Domini (2nd Sunday after Easter)
- GWV 1132/37: Guter Hirte willst du nicht (1737) – SATB, str, bc – Misericordas Domini (2nd Sunday after Easter)
- GWV 1132/39: Du Hirte Israel höre (1739) – SATB, chal (2)at, hn, str, bc – Misericordas Domini (2nd Sunday after Easter)
- GWV 1132/40: Darum preiset Gott seine Liebe gegen uns (1740) – SATB, (fl), str, bc – Misericordas Domini (2nd Sunday after Easter)
- GWV 1132/42: Guter Hirte willst du nicht (1742) – SATB, str, bc – Misericordas Domini (2nd Sunday after Easter)
- GWV 1132/43: Erkennet dass der Herr Gott ist (1743) – SATB, str, bc – Misericordas Domini (2nd Sunday after Easter)
- GWV 1132/45: Ach Jesu wie bist du so treu (1745) – ATB, hn, str, bc – Misericordas Domini (2nd Sunday after Easter)
- GWV 1132/47: Du Hirte Israel höre (1747) – ATB, str, bc – Misericordas Domini (2nd Sunday after Easter)
- GWV 1132/53: Der Herr ist mein Hirt (1753) – SATB, fl (2), fg (2), hn (2), str, bc – Misericordas Domini (2nd Sunday after Easter)

=== GWV 1133 ===
- GWV 1133/11: Es kann nicht anders sein (1711) – S, fl, ob (2), str, bc – Jubilate (3rd Sunday after Easter)
- GWV 1133/13: O Jesu Christ mein's Lebens Licht (1713) – SSTB, ob (2), str, bc – Jubilate (3rd Sunday after Easter)
- GWV 1133/18: Gelobet sei der Herr täglich (1718) – SSAB, str, bc – Jubilate (3rd Sunday after Easter)
- GWV 1133/19: Wir müssen durch viel Trübsal (1719) – SATB, str, bc – Jubilate (3rd Sunday after Easter)
- GWV 1133/20: Du schönes Wohnhaus (1720) – SSB, str, bc – Jubilate (3rd Sunday after Easter)
- GWV 1133/27: Mein Freudenlicht hat sich verborgen (1727) – SATB, str, bc – Jubilate (3rd Sunday after Easter)
- GWV 1133/28: Wir rühmen uns auch der Trübsal (1728) – SATB, fl, ob (2), fg, str, bc – Jubilate (3rd Sunday after Easter)
- GWV 1133/29: Die mit Tränen säen (1729) – SATB, fl/ob, str, bc – Jubilate (3rd Sunday after Easter)
- GWV 1133/30: Ihr werdet weinen und heulen (1730) – SATB, str, bc – Jubilate (3rd Sunday after Easter)
- GWV 1133/36: Ein rechter Christ kann auch bei Tränen lachen (1736) – SSATB, chal (2)tb, fg, str, bc – Jubilate (3rd Sunday after Easter)
- GWV 1133/40: Schwing dich auf zu deinem Gott (1740) – SATB, str, bc – Jubilate (3rd Sunday after Easter)
- GWV 1133/41: Saget den verzagten Herzen (1741) – SATB, str, bc – Jubilate (3rd Sunday after Easter)
- GWV 1133/42: Ach Gott dein Rat ist wunderbar (1742) – SATB, str, bc – Jubilate (3rd Sunday after Easter)
- GWV 1133/43: Wie lange muss ich noch wallen (1743) – SATB, str, bc – Jubilate (3rd Sunday after Easter)
- GWV 1133/44: Ach Gott wie manches Herzeleid (1744) – SATB, str, bc – Jubilate (3rd Sunday after Easter)
- GWV 1133/45: Achtet es eitel Freude (1745) – ATB, str, bc – Jubilate (3rd Sunday after Easter)
- GWV 1133/46: Ein Weib wenn sie gebieret (1746) – SAB, str, bc – Jubilate (3rd Sunday after Easter)
- GWV 1133/48: Es wechselt Gott mit Kreuz (1748) – SAB, str, bc – Jubilate (3rd Sunday after Easter)
- GWV 1133/51: Was willst du dich betrüben (1751) – SATB, str, bc – Jubilate (3rd Sunday after Easter)
- GWV 1133/53: Ihr Heiligen lobsinget dem Herrn (1753) – SATB, str, bc – Jubilate (3rd Sunday after Easter)

=== GWV 1134 ===
- GWV 1134/20: Gottes überreiche Liebe (1720) – S, str, bc – Cantate (4th Sunday after Easter)
- GWV 1134/21: Warum willst du unser so gar vergessen (1721) – TB, str, bc – Cantate (4th Sunday after Easter)
- GWV 1134/22: Seht Jesus will zum Vater gehen (1722) – SSATB, ob (2), fg, str, bc – Cantate (4th Sunday after Easter)
- GWV 1134/23: Nehmet das Wort an mit Sanftmut (1723) – SATB, str, bc – Cantate (4th Sunday after Easter)
- GWV 1134/24: Niemand kann Jesum einen Herrn heissen (1724) – SATB, str, bc – Cantate (4th Sunday after Easter)
- GWV 1134/25: Gross und wundersam sind deine Werke (1725) – SATB, ob, fg, str, bc – Cantate (4th Sunday after Easter)
- GWV 1134/26: Ach Jesus weicht er will zum Vater (1726) – SATB, fl (2), ob (2), fg, str, bc – Cantate (4th Sunday after Easter)
- GWV 1134/32: Wer sich gern lässet strafen (1732) – SATB, str, bc – Cantate (4th Sunday after Easter)
- GWV 1134/33: Wer fromm ist bekommt Trost (1733) – SATB, str, bc – Cantate (4th Sunday after Easter)
- GWV 1134/34: Jesus' Liebe ist geschäftig (1734) – SATB, str, bc – Cantate (4th Sunday after Easter)
- GWV 1134/35: Ihr seid nicht fleischlich (1735) – SATB, fl, chal (2)tb, str, bc – Cantate (4th Sunday after Easter)
- GWV 1134/37: Lass der Gottlosen Bosheit ein Ende werden (1737) – SATB, fl, ob, str, bc – Cantate (4th Sunday after Easter)
- GWV 1134/39: Wenn der Geist der Wahrheit kommen wird (1739) – SATB, str, bc – Cantate (4th Sunday after Easter)
- GWV 1134/40: Sende dein Licht und deine Wahrheit (1740) – SATB, chal (3)stb, violetta (2), str, bc – Cantate (4th Sunday after Easter)
- GWV 1134/41: Hilf Herr die Welt ist frech (1741) – SATB, ob, str, bc – Cantate (4th Sunday after Easter)
- GWV 1134/42: Hört Jesus will zum Vater gehen (1742) – ATB, ob, str, bc – Cantate (4th Sunday after Easter)
- GWV 1134/43: Werter Geist Kraft aus der Höhe (1743) – SATB, ob, str, bc – Cantate (4th Sunday after Easter)
- GWV 1134/44: Der Gerechte schlage mich freundlich (1744) – SATB, str, bc – Cantate (4th Sunday after Easter)
- GWV 1134/47: Der Gerechte schlage mich freundlich (1747) – ATB, str, bc – Cantate (4th Sunday after Easter)
- GWV 1134/53: Was betrübst du dich meine Seele (1753) – SATB, hn (2), str, bc – Cantate (4th Sunday after Easter)

=== GWV 1135 ===
- GWV 1135/13: Ich bin zwar Asch und Kot (1713) – B, ob (2), str, bc – Rogate (5th Sunday after Easter)
- GWV 1135/18: Das Verlangen der Elenden hörest du Herr (1718) – SSAB, str, bc – Rogate (5th Sunday after Easter)
- GWV 1135/19: Wahrlich ich sage euch so ihr den Vater (1719) – STB, str, bc – Rogate (5th Sunday after Easter)
- GWV 1135/24: Steigt ihr Seufzer in die Höhe (1724) – SATB, ob (2), fg, str, bc – Rogate (5th Sunday after Easter)
- GWV 1135/26: Bittet so werdet ihr nehmen (1726) – SATB, (fl), ob (2), fg, str, bc – Rogate (5th Sunday after Easter)
- GWV 1135/27: Wo zween unter euch eins werden (1727) – SATB, str, bc – Rogate (5th Sunday after Easter)
- GWV 1135/29: Vater unser im Himmelreich (1729) – SATB, str, bc – Rogate (5th Sunday after Easter)
- GWV 1135/30: Betet stets in allen Anliegen (1730) – SATB, str, bc – Rogate (5th Sunday after Easter)
- GWV 1135/36: Lass dir an meiner Gnade genügen (1736) – SATB, str, bc – Rogate (5th Sunday after Easter)
- GWV 1135/38: Wenn du betest (1738) – SATBB, fg, str, bc – Rogate (5th Sunday after Easter)
- GWV 1135/40: Christus ist nicht eingegangen (1740) – SATB, str, bc – Rogate (5th Sunday after Easter)
- GWV 1135/41: Ihr armen Menschen lernt doch beten (1741) – SATB, ob, str, bc – Rogate (5th Sunday after Easter)
- GWV 1135/42: Wohlauf mein Herz zu Gott (1742) – ATB, ob (2), str, bc – Rogate (5th Sunday after Easter)
- GWV 1135/43: Alles was ihr bittet (1743) – SATB, str, bc – Rogate (5th Sunday after Easter)
- GWV 1135/44: Bittet so wird euch gegeben (1744) – SATB, str, bc – Rogate (5th Sunday after Easter)
- GWV 1135/46: Vater unser im Himmelreich (1746) – SATB, chal (2)tb(/fg (2)), str, bc – Rogate (5th Sunday after Easter)
- GWV 1135/48: Alles was ihr bittet (1748) – ATB, str, bc – Rogate (5th Sunday after Easter)
- GWV 1135/50: Was der Gottlose fürchtet (1750) – SATB, str, bc – Rogate (5th Sunday after Easter)
- GWV 1135/51: Geh mein Herz in deine Kammer (1751) – SATB, str, bc – Rogate (5th Sunday after Easter)
- GWV 1135/53: Lass dir wohlgefallen die Rede (1753) – SATB, fl (2), fg, vla, str, bc – Rogate (5th Sunday after Easter)

=== GWV 1136 ===
- GWV 1136/11: Der Himmel ist offen (1711) – S, ob (2), fg, str, bc – Ascension Day
- GWV 1136/21: Halleluja denn der allmächtige Gott (1721) – SSATB, clar (2), timp (2), str, bc – Ascension Day
- GWV 1136/22: Gott fährt mit Jauchzen auf (1722) – SSATB, ob (2), fg, str, bc – Ascension Day
- GWV 1136/23: Sein Rat ist wunderbar (1723) – SATB, str, bc – Ascension Day
- GWV 1136/25: Auf frohlocket mit vollen Chören (1725) – SSATB, clar (2), timp (2), str, bc – Ascension Day
- GWV 1136/28: Seid ihr mit Christo auferstanden (1728) – SATB, str, bc – Ascension Day
- GWV 1136/32: Es jauchzen aller Engel Scharen (1732) – SATB, str, bc – Ascension Day
- GWV 1136/33: Jesus nimmt den Himmel ein (1733) – SATB, fl, str, bc – Ascension Day
- GWV 1136/34: Erfreue dich o Christenheit (1734) – SATB, clar (2), timp (2), str, bc – Ascension Day
- GWV 1136/35: Auf diesen Tag bedenken wir (1735) – SSATB, fl (2), ob, str, bc – Ascension Day
- GWV 1136/37: Der Herr nachdem er mit ihnen geredet (1737) – SATB, str, bc – Ascension Day
- GWV 1136/39: Wer will verdammen (1739) – SATB, str, bc – Ascension Day
- GWV 1136/40: Dieweil wir empfahen ein unbewegliches Reich (1740) – SATB, ob (2), hn (2), timp (2), str, bc – Ascension Day
- GWV 1136/41: Begürtet eure Lenden (1741) – SATB, ob (2), hn (2), timp (4), str, bc – Ascension Day
- GWV 1136/42: Du kleine Herde freue dich (1742) – STB, str, bc – Ascension Day
- GWV 1136/43: Erkauftes Volk lass alles Trauern sein (1743) – SATB, str, bc – Ascension Day
- GWV 1136/45: Mein Herz klebt nicht mehr an der Erde (1745) – ATB, clar, str, bc – Ascension Day
- GWV 1136/47: Der Herr ist aufgefahren in die Höhe (1747) – ATB, str, bc – Ascension Day
- GWV 1136/53: Frohlocket mit Händen alle Völker (1753) – SATB, fl (2), fg (2), hn (2), timp (4), str, bc – Ascension Day

=== GWV 1137 ===
- GWV 1137/13: Ich esse nichts als Aschenbrot (1713) – S, vl (2), str, bc – Exaudi (Sunday after Ascension, 6th Sunday after Easter)
- GWV 1137/16: Liebe Gott und deinen Nächsten (1716) – B, vl (2), bc – Exaudi (Sunday after Ascension, 6th Sunday after Easter)
- GWV 1137/18: Geist der Geister, Seel der Seelen (1718) – S, str, bc – Exaudi (Sunday after Ascension, 6th Sunday after Easter)
- GWV 1137/19: Jesu hilf siegen (1719) – STB, str, bc – Exaudi (Sunday after Ascension, 6th Sunday after Easter)
- GWV 1137/20: Weg ihr flatternden Gedanken (1720) – B, vl unis, bc – Exaudi (Sunday after Ascension, 6th Sunday after Easter)
- GWV 1137/24: Wir die wir leben (1724) – SATB, str, bc – Exaudi (Sunday after Ascension, 6th Sunday after Easter)
- GWV 1137/26: Unsere Trübsal die zeitlich und leicht ist (1726) – SATB, ob (2), fg, str, bc – Exaudi (Sunday after Ascension, 6th Sunday after Easter)
- GWV 1137/27: Wo Gott der Herr nicht bei uns hält (1727) – SATB, fl (2), ob (2), fg, str, bc – Exaudi (Sunday after Ascension, 6th Sunday after Easter)
- GWV 1137/29: Komm werter Tröster (1729) – SATB, str, bc – Exaudi (Sunday after Ascension, 6th Sunday after Easter)
- GWV 1137/30: Wär Gott nicht mit uns diese Zeit (1730) – SATB, str, bc – Exaudi (Sunday after Ascension, 6th Sunday after Easter)
- GWV 1137/36: Es kommt die Zeit (1736) – SATB, str, bc – Exaudi (Sunday after Ascension, 6th Sunday after Easter)
- GWV 1137/38: Wär' Gott nicht mit uns diese Zeit (1738) – SATBB, str, bc – Exaudi (Sunday after Ascension, 6th Sunday after Easter)
- GWV 1137/40: Der Heilige Geist so recht lehret (1740) – SATB, str, bc – Exaudi (Sunday after Ascension, 6th Sunday after Easter)
- GWV 1137/41: Fürchtet euch nicht wenn euch die Leute (1741) – SATB, str, bc – Exaudi (Sunday after Ascension, 6th Sunday after Easter)
- GWV 1137/42: Treuer Tröster aus der Höhe (1742) – B, str, bc – Exaudi (Sunday after Ascension, 6th Sunday after Easter)
- GWV 1137/43: Mag ich Unglück nicht widerstahn (1743) – SATB, str, bc – Exaudi (Sunday after Ascension, 6th Sunday after Easter)
- GWV 1137/44: Ach Gott ach Vater sieh (1744) – SATB, str, bc – Exaudi (Sunday after Ascension, 6th Sunday after Easter)
- GWV 1137/46: Es ist euch gut dass ich hingehe (1746) – SATB, str, bc – Exaudi (Sunday after Ascension, 6th Sunday after Easter)
- GWV 1137/48: Wenn der Tröster kommen wird (1748) – ATB, str, bc – Exaudi (Sunday after Ascension, 6th Sunday after Easter)
- GWV 1137/49: Freuet euch dass ihr mit Christo leidet (1749) – SATB, str, bc – Exaudi (Sunday after Ascension, 6th Sunday after Easter)
- GWV 1137/50: Die Lippen der Gerechten (1750) – SATB, str, bc – Exaudi (Sunday after Ascension, 6th Sunday after Easter)
- GWV 1137/51: Es kommt die Zeit dass wer euch tötet (1751) – SATB, fg, str, bc – Exaudi (Sunday after Ascension, 6th Sunday after Easter)
- GWV 1137/53: Wie wir gehöret haben (1753) – SATB, str, bc – Exaudi (Sunday after Ascension, 6th Sunday after Easter)

=== GWV 1138 ===
- GWV 1138/11: Reiner Geist lass doch mein Herz (1711) – S, ob (2), (fg), str, bc – Whit Sunday (1st Day of Pentecost)
- GWV 1138/12: Wer mich liebet der wird mein Wort halten (1712) – SSSATB, ob (2), str, bc – Whit Sunday (1st Day of Pentecost)
- GWV 1138/18: Wer mich liebet der wird mein Wort halten (1718) – SSATB, str, bc – Whit Sunday (1st Day of Pentecost)
- GWV 1138/21: Nun gibst du Gott ein gnädigen Regen (1721) – SSATB, fl (2), ob (2), str, bc – Whit Sunday (1st Day of Pentecost)
- GWV 1138/22: Gott naht sich uns (1722) – SSATB, ob (2), str, bc – Whit Sunday (1st Day of Pentecost)
- GWV 1138/23: Gross sind die Werke des Herrn (1723) – ATB, fl, str, bc – Whit Sunday (1st Day of Pentecost)
- GWV 1138/24: Der Herr ist in seinem heiligen Tempel (1724) – SSATB, clar (2), timp (2), str, bc – Whit Sunday (1st Day of Pentecost)
- GWV 1138/25: Ich will in ihnen wohnen (1725) – SSATB, fl, ob, fg, clar (2), timp (2), str, bc – Whit Sunday (1st Day of Pentecost)
- GWV 1138/28: Träufelt ihr Himmel mit Gnade (1728) – SATB, fl, ob (2), fg, clar (2), timp (2), vl (2), str, bc – Whit Sunday (1st Day of Pentecost)
- GWV 1138/32: Der Geist des Herrn (1732) – SATB, fl, fg, clar (2), timp (2), str, bc – Whit Sunday (1st Day of Pentecost)
- GWV 1138/33: Lass dein Ohr auf Weisheit (1733) – SATB, str, bc – Whit Sunday (1st Day of Pentecost)
- GWV 1138/34: Prediget von denen Gerechten (1734) – SATB, (fl), ob, hn (2), timp (3), str, bc – Whit Sunday (1st Day of Pentecost)
- GWV 1138/35: Der Friede Gottes welcher höher ist (1735) – SSATB, fl, chal (2)tb, str, bc – Whit Sunday (1st Day of Pentecost)
- GWV 1138/39: Ihr Herzen räumt die Sünde aus (1739) – SATBB, chal (2)at, fg, str, bc – Whit Sunday (1st Day of Pentecost)
- GWV 1138/40: Es fällt ein holder Tau der Gnade (1740) – SATB, chal (3)stb, clar (2), timp (2), vl, str, bc – Whit Sunday (1st Day of Pentecost)
- GWV 1138/41: Freut euch Gottes Geist die Taube (1741) – SATB, ob (2), fg, clar (2), timp (4), str, bc – Whit Sunday (1st Day of Pentecost)
- GWV 1138/42: Du schmachtende du müde Schar (1742) – ATB, ob (2), str, bc – Whit Sunday (1st Day of Pentecost)
- GWV 1138/43: Du lechzendes du dürres Land (1743) – SATB, chal (2)tb, str, bc – Whit Sunday (1st Day of Pentecost)
- GWV 1138/45: Auf ihr Herzen schickt euch an (1745) – ATB, hn (2), clar, timp (2), str, bc – Whit Sunday (1st Day of Pentecost)
- GWV 1138/46: Das Reich Gottes ist nicht Essen und Trinken (1746) – SATB, fl, hn (2), clar (2), timp (4), str, bc – Whit Sunday (1st Day of Pentecost)
- GWV 1138/47: Wisset ihr nicht dass euer Leib (1747) – ATB, ob (2), chal (2)tb(/ob (2)), fg, hn (2), timp (4), str, bc – Whit Sunday (1st Day of Pentecost)
- GWV 1138/53: Der Herr ist Gott der uns erleuchtet (1753) – SATB, fl (2), hn (2), timp (4), str, bc – Whit Sunday (1st Day of Pentecost)

=== GWV 1139 ===
- GWV 1139/11: In meinem Blute liegt dein Leben (1711) – SB, ob (2), str, bc – Whit Monday (2nd Day of Pentecost)
- GWV 1139/16: Schaffe in mir Gott ein reines Herz (1716) – SSAB, fl, str, bc – Whit Monday (2nd Day of Pentecost)
- GWV 1139/18: Also hat Gott die Welt geliebet (1718) – SSATB, fg (2), violetta (2), str, bc – Whit Monday (2nd Day of Pentecost)
- GWV 1139/19: Darum preiset Gott seine Liebe gegen uns (1719) – SATB, ob, str, bc – Whit Monday (2nd Day of Pentecost)
- GWV 1139/20: Frohlocke ganzes Rund der Erden (1720) – B, fg (2), violetta (2), str, bc – Whit Monday (2nd Day of Pentecost)
- GWV 1139/26: Die Liebe Gottes ist ausgegossen in unser Herz (1726) – SATB, fl (2), fg, str, bc – Whit Monday (2nd Day of Pentecost)
- GWV 1139/27: Gott hat uns nicht gesetzt zum Zorn (1727) – SATB, fl (2), ob (2), fg, vl, str, bc – Whit Monday (2nd Day of Pentecost)
- GWV 1139/29: Aus Gnade seid ihr selig worden (1729) – SATB, str, bc – Whit Monday (2nd Day of Pentecost)
- GWV 1139/30: Also hat Gott die Welt geliebet (1730) – SATB, str, bc – Whit Monday (2nd Day of Pentecost)
- GWV 1139/36: Herr Christ der einig Gottes Sohn (1736) – SATB, ob am (2), fg, str, bc – Whit Monday (2nd Day of Pentecost)
- GWV 1139/38: Wer die Wahrheit tut (1738) – SATB, (fl), fg, vla am, str, bc – Whit Monday (2nd Day of Pentecost)
- GWV 1139/40: So halten wir es nun dass der Mensch (1740) – SATB, (fl), ob (2), fg, hn (2), tra, timp (4), str, bc – Whit Monday (2nd Day of Pentecost)
- GWV 1139/41: Wir rühmen uns Gottes (1741) – SATB, ob (2), str, bc – Whit Monday (2nd Day of Pentecost)
- GWV 1139/42: O Jesu Christ mein höchstes Licht (1742) – ATB, str, bc – Whit Monday (2nd Day of Pentecost)
- GWV 1139/43: Gott ist die Liebe (1743) – SATB, str, bc – Whit Monday (2nd Day of Pentecost)
- GWV 1139/44: Ohne Glaube ist's unmöglich (1744) – SATB, str, bc – Whit Monday (2nd Day of Pentecost)
- GWV 1139/46: Ist Gott für uns wer mag wieder uns sein (1746) – SATB, str, bc – Whit Monday (2nd Day of Pentecost)
- GWV 1139/48: Wer den Sohn Gottes hat (1748) – ATB, str, bc – Whit Monday (2nd Day of Pentecost)
- GWV 1139/49: Gott liebt die Welt (1749) – SAT, str, bc – Whit Monday (2nd Day of Pentecost)
- GWV 1139/50: Der Gerechten Pfad glänzet (1750) – SATB, str, bc – Whit Monday (2nd Day of Pentecost)
- GWV 1139/51: Also hat Gott die Welt geliebt (1751) – SATB, fl (2), hn (2), str, bc – Whit Monday (2nd Day of Pentecost)
- GWV 1139/53: Gross sind die Werke des Herrn (1753) – SATB, fl (2), hn (2), clar (2), timp (5), str, bc – Whit Monday (2nd Day of Pentecost)

=== GWV 1140 ===
- GWV 1140/11: Der Herr ist mein Hirt (1711) – S, ob (2), (fg), vl (2), bc – Whit Tuesday (3rd Day of Pentecost)
- GWV 1140/12: Jesu führe meine Seele (1712) – B, vl unis, bc – Whit Tuesday (3rd Day of Pentecost)
- GWV 1140/21: Niemand kann Jesum einen Herrn heissen (1721) – SATB, str, bc – Whit Tuesday (3rd Day of Pentecost)
- GWV 1140/22: Kommt auf Zions reiche Auen (1722) – SSATB, hn (2), str, bc – Whit Tuesday (3rd Day of Pentecost)
- GWV 1140/23: So ihr die ihr arg seid (1723) – SATB, str, bc – Whit Tuesday (3rd Day of Pentecost)
- GWV 1140/24: Der Herr ist mein getreuer Hirt (1724) – SATB, hn, str, bc – Whit Tuesday (3rd Day of Pentecost)
- GWV 1140/25: Jesu frommer Menschenherden (1725) – SATB, fl, hn (2), vla am, str, bc – Whit Tuesday (3rd Day of Pentecost)
- GWV 1140/28: Wer nicht zur Tür hineingehet (1728) – SATB, str, bc – Whit Tuesday (3rd Day of Pentecost)
- GWV 1140/32: Ach guter Hirte lass dich finden (1732) – SATB, str, bc – Whit Tuesday (3rd Day of Pentecost)
- GWV 1140/33: Wer mich findet der findet das Leben (1733) – SATB, str, bc – Whit Tuesday (3rd Day of Pentecost)
- GWV 1140/34: Sei getrost du kleine Herde (1734) – ATB, fl (2)/ob am (2), str, bc – Whit Tuesday (3rd Day of Pentecost)
- GWV 1140/35: Ich bin die Tür (1735) – SATB, fl (2), str, bc – Whit Tuesday (3rd Day of Pentecost)
- GWV 1140/39: So spricht der Herr (1739) – SATB, str, bc – Whit Tuesday (3rd Day of Pentecost)
- GWV 1140/40: Schicket euch in die Zeit (1740) – SATB, ob, str, bc – Whit Tuesday (3rd Day of Pentecost)
- GWV 1140/41: Alle die vor mir kommen sind (1741) – SATB, ob, str, bc – Whit Tuesday (3rd Day of Pentecost)
- GWV 1140/42: Ihr frommen Schafe wacht (1742) – T, str, bc – Whit Tuesday (3rd Day of Pentecost)
- GWV 1140/43: Wer nicht zur Tür hineingehet (1743) – B, str, bc – Whit Tuesday (3rd Day of Pentecost)
- GWV 1140/45: Ihr Lieben glaubet nicht einem jeglichen Geist (1745) – T, str, bc – Whit Tuesday (3rd Day of Pentecost)
- GWV 1140/46: Der Herr ist mein getreuer Hirt (1746) – SATB, str, bc – Whit Tuesday (3rd Day of Pentecost)
- GWV 1140/47: Alle die vor mir kommen sind (1747) – ATB, str, bc – Whit Tuesday (3rd Day of Pentecost)

=== GWV 1141 ===
- GWV 1141/16: Heilig, heilig, heilig heisst Gott (1716) – SATB, clar (2), timp (2), str, bc – Trinity Sunday
- GWV 1141/18: Es sei denn dass jemand geboren werde (1718) – SSATB, ob (2), str, bc – Trinity Sunday
- GWV 1141/19: Es sei denn dass jemand von neuem geboren werde (1719) – SATB, str, bc – Trinity Sunday
- GWV 1141/20: O welche Tiefe hoher Schlüsse (1720) – B, str, bc – Trinity Sunday
- GWV 1141/26: O welch eine Tiefe des Reichtums (1726) – SATB, ob (2), clar (2), timp (2), str, bc – Trinity Sunday
- GWV 1141/27: Gelobet sei Gott und der Vater (1727) – SATB, fl (2), ob (2), fg, clar (2), timp (2), str, bc – Trinity Sunday
- GWV 1141/29: Der Wind bläset wo er will (1729) – SATB, str, bc – Trinity Sunday
- GWV 1141/30: Lobet den Herrn denn unsern Gott (1730) – SATB, str, bc – Trinity Sunday
- GWV 1141/36: Dieweil die Welt in ihrer Weisheit (1736) – SATB, fg, str, bc – Trinity Sunday
- GWV 1141/38: Ich erzähle meine Wege (1738) – SATB, fg, str, bc – Trinity Sunday
- GWV 1141/40: Kommt Jesus öffnet seine Schule (1740) – SATB, ob/chals, str, bc – Trinity Sunday
- GWV 1141/41: Sei gerne bei den Alten (1741) – SATB, ob (2), fg, clar (2), timp (4), str, bc – Trinity Sunday
- GWV 1141/42: Eins ist Not in Jesus' Schule (1742) – ATB, str, bc – Trinity Sunday
- GWV 1141/43: Merkt auf ihr Seelen Jesus lehrt (1743) – SATB, str, bc – Trinity Sunday
- GWV 1141/44: Der Gnadenbrunn fleusst noch (1744) – SATB, chal (2)at, fg, hn (2), clar (2), timp (4), str, bc – Trinity Sunday
- GWV 1141/46: Der Wind bläset wo er will (1746) – SATB, str, bc – Trinity Sunday
- GWV 1141/48: Alles was mir mein Vater gibt (1748) – SATB, fl (2), hn (2), timp (4), str, bc – Trinity Sunday
- GWV 1141/49: Weise mir Herr deinen Weg (1749) – SATB, fl (2), clar (2), timp (4), str, bc – Trinity Sunday
- GWV 1141/50: Gleichwie du nicht weisest den Weg (1750) – SATB, str, bc – Trinity Sunday
- GWV 1141/51: Lehre mich tun nach deinem Wohlgefallen (1751) – SATB, fl (2), hn (2), str, bc – Trinity Sunday
- GWV 1141/53: Herr es ist dir keiner gleich unter den Göttern (1753) – ATB, hn (2), timp (5), str, bc – Trinity Sunday

=== GWV 1142 ===
- GWV 1142/11: Ach Gott wie manches Herzeleid (1711) – S, ob (2), fg, str, bc – 1st Sunday after Trinity
- GWV 1142/12: Meine Liebe lebt in Gott (1712) – SS, fl (2), ob (2), str, bc – 1st Sunday after Trinity
- GWV 1142/13: Ihr irdischen Gedanken flieht (1713) – SB, ob (2), vl (2), str, bc – 1st Sunday after Trinity
- GWV 1142/21: Das Warten der Gerechten wird Freude werden (1721) – SATB, ob (2), str, bc – 1st Sunday after Trinity
- GWV 1142/22: Ehre Lust und Pracht der Welt (1722) – SSATB, ob (2), str, bc – 1st Sunday after Trinity
- GWV 1142/23: Gott ist die Liebe (1723) – AB, str, bc – 1st Sunday after Trinity
- GWV 1142/24: Die Welt vergehet mit ihrer Lust (1724) – SATB, ob (am), str, bc – 1st Sunday after Trinity
- GWV 1142/25: Ihr sollt sehen was für ein Unterschied (1725) – SATB, fl, str, bc – 1st Sunday after Trinity
- GWV 1142/28: Harre auf den Herrn (1728) – SATB, ob (2), str, bc – 1st Sunday after Trinity
- GWV 1142/30: Es ist noch um ein kleines (1730) – SATB, str, bc – 1st Sunday after Trinity
- GWV 1142/31: Verlasset euch nicht auf Unrecht (1731) – SATB, str, bc – 1st Sunday after Trinity
- GWV 1142/32: Wie ungleich ist der Menschen Leben (1732) – SATB, hn (2), tra, str, bc – 1st Sunday after Trinity
- GWV 1142/33: Wer sich auf seinen Reichtum verlässet (1733) – SATB, str, bc – 1st Sunday after Trinity
- GWV 1142/34: Ach sagt mir nichts von Gold und Schätzen (1734) – SATB, fl (2), ob am, str, bc – 1st Sunday after Trinity
- GWV 1142/35: Weg mit allen Schätzen (1735) – SATB, str, bc – 1st Sunday after Trinity
- GWV 1142/39: Den Reichen dieser Welt gebeut (1739) – SATB, str, bc – 1st Sunday after Trinity
- GWV 1142/40: Ach sagt mir nichts von Gold und Schätzen (1740) – SATB, str, bc – 1st Sunday after Trinity
- GWV 1142/41: Liebet den Herrn alle seine Heiligen (1741) – SATB, str, bc – 1st Sunday after Trinity
- GWV 1142/42: O Ewigkeit wer denkt an dich (1742) – STB, str, bc – 1st Sunday after Trinity
- GWV 1142/43: Erschrecklich ist es (1743) – SATB, str, bc – 1st Sunday after Trinity
- GWV 1142/45: Ach eitle Herzen (1745) – SATB, str, bc – 1st Sunday after Trinity
- GWV 1142/46: Ein Reicher schmachtet in der Hölle (1746) – SATB, str, bc – 1st Sunday after Trinity
- GWV 1142/47: Es sind ja Gott sehr schlechte Sachen (1747) – SAT, str, bc – 1st Sunday after Trinity

=== GWV 1143 ===
- GWV 1143/11: Mit dieser Flut vergossner Tränen (1711) – S, ob (2), str, bc – 2nd Sunday after Trinity
- GWV 1143/12: Wenn wir in höchsten Nöten sein (1712) – SS, ob (2), str, bc – 2nd Sunday after Trinity
- GWV 1143/18: Ich will mich mit dir verloben (1718) – SB, str, bc – 2nd Sunday after Trinity
- GWV 1143/19: Schmecket und sehet wie freundlich der Herr ist (1719) – SATB, str, bc – 2nd Sunday after Trinity
- GWV 1143/20: Arge Welt du falsche Schlange (1720) – B, str, bc – 2nd Sunday after Trinity
- GWV 1143/23: Meine Kindlein lasset uns nicht lieben (1723) – AB, str, bc – 2nd Sunday after Trinity
- GWV 1143/27: Kommt zu Gottes Abendmahl (1727) – SATB, str, bc – 2nd Sunday after Trinity
- GWV 1143/29: Der Gnadenbrunn' fleusst noch (1729) – SATB, str, bc – 2nd Sunday after Trinity
- GWV 1143/34: Siehe meine Knechte sollen essen (1734) – SATB, (fl/ob), str, bc – 2nd Sunday after Trinity
- GWV 1143/36: Seht doch die Welt will höflich sein (1736) – SATB, str, bc – 2nd Sunday after Trinity
- GWV 1143/38: Gute Nacht o Wesen (1738) – SATB, str, bc – 2nd Sunday after Trinity
- GWV 1143/40: Wer Ohren hat der höre (1740) – SATB, ob (2), fg, vl (2), str, bc – 2nd Sunday after Trinity
- GWV 1143/41: Gott macht ein grosses Mahl (1741) – SATB, ob, str, bc – 2nd Sunday after Trinity
- GWV 1143/42: Kommt Sünder Jesus ladet euch (1742) – ATB, str, bc – 2nd Sunday after Trinity
- GWV 1143/43: Wendet euch zu mir so werdet ihr selig (1743) – SATB, str, bc – 2nd Sunday after Trinity
- GWV 1143/44: Gott macht ein grosses Mahl (1744) – SATB, str, bc – 2nd Sunday after Trinity
- GWV 1143/46: Es war ein Mensch der machte ein gross Abendmahl (1746) – ATB, str, bc – 2nd Sunday after Trinity
- GWV 1143/48: Der Herr sprach zu dem Knechte (1748) – SATB, chal (2)at, fg, str, bc – 2nd Sunday after Trinity
- GWV 1143/51: Selig ist der das Brot isst (1751) – ATB, fl (2), fg, str, bc – 2nd Sunday after Trinity
- GWV 1143/53: Schmecket und sehet wie freundlich der Herr ist (1753) – ATB, fl (2), str, bc – 2nd Sunday after Trinity

=== GWV 1144 ===
- GWV 1144/11: Ach Gott und Herr (1711) – S, ob, str, bc – 3rd Sunday after Trinity
- GWV 1144/12: Demütiget euch nun (1712) – SS, str, bc – 3rd Sunday after Trinity
- GWV 1144/21: Warum lässt du uns Herr irren (1721) – ST, str, bc – 3rd Sunday after Trinity
- GWV 1144/22: Jesus nimmt die Sünder an (1722) – SATB, str, bc – 3rd Sunday after Trinity
- GWV 1144/24: Ach was soll ich Sünder machen (1724) – SSATB, ob(am) (2), str, bc – 3rd Sunday after Trinity
- GWV 1144/28: Kommt Sünder Jesus locket euch (1728) – SATB, str, bc – 3rd Sunday after Trinity
- GWV 1144/31: Erkennet dass der Herr Gott ist (1731) – SATB, ob am, str, bc – 3rd Sunday after Trinity
- GWV 1144/32: Die Starken bedürfen des Arztes nicht (1732) – SATB, str, bc – 3rd Sunday after Trinity
- GWV 1144/35: Die Gnadentür ist aufgetan (1735) – SATB, str, bc – 3rd Sunday after Trinity
- GWV 1144/40: Jesus nimmt die Sünder an (1740) – SATB, str, bc – 3rd Sunday after Trinity
- GWV 1144/41: Jesu der du meine Seele hast (1741) – SATB, fg, str, bc – 3rd Sunday after Trinity
- GWV 1144/42: Sieh hier bin ich Ehrenkönig (1742) – ATB, str, bc – 3rd Sunday after Trinity
- GWV 1144/43: Kommt herbei zerstreute Schafe (1743) – SATB, str, bc – 3rd Sunday after Trinity
- GWV 1144/44: Nahet euch zu Gott (1744) – SATB, str, bc – 3rd Sunday after Trinity
- GWV 1144/45: Freuet euch mit mir (1745) – SATB, str, bc – 3rd Sunday after Trinity
- GWV 1144/46: Welcher Mensch ist unter euch (1746) – ATB, str, bc – 3rd Sunday after Trinity
- GWV 1144/47: Wo sich der Gottlose bekehret (1747) – SATB, str, bc – 3rd Sunday after Trinity
- GWV 1144/49: Verirrtes Schaf merk auf (1749) – SATB, str, bc – 3rd Sunday after Trinity

=== GWV 1145 ===
- GWV 1145/10: Gib Gott dass ich nach deinem Willen (1710) – B, ob (2), str, bc – 4th Sunday after Trinity
- GWV 1145/11: Angst und Jammer (1711) – S, str, bc – 4th Sunday after Trinity
- GWV 1145/13: Seid barmherzig wie auch euer Vater (1713) – SSATB, ob (2), str, bc – 4th Sunday after Trinity
- GWV 1145/16: Muss ich denn noch ferner leiden (1716) – S, fl, str, bc – 4th Sunday after Trinity
- GWV 1145/18: Erforsche mich Gott und erfahre mein Herz (1718) – SATB, str, bc – 4th Sunday after Trinity
- GWV 1145/20: Mein Geist ist unverzagt (1720) – B, vl (2), str, bc – 4th Sunday after Trinity
- GWV 1145/21: Seid barmherzig wie auch euer Vater (1721) – STB, str, bc – 4th Sunday after Trinity
- GWV 1145/23: Das ängstliche Harren der Kreatur wartet (1723) – SATB, ob (2), fg, str, bc – 4th Sunday after Trinity
- GWV 1145/25: Grosser Vater voll Erbarmen (1725) – SSATTB, fl, vl, str, bc – 4th Sunday after Trinity
- GWV 1145/32: Kommt lasst euch den Herren lehren (1732) – SATB, str, bc – 4th Sunday after Trinity
- GWV 1145/37: Wer eine Grube machet (1737) – SATB, fl (2), str, bc – 4th Sunday after Trinity
- GWV 1145/40: Es ist ein einiger Gesetzgeber (1740) – SATB, str, bc – 4th Sunday after Trinity
- GWV 1145/41: Der Herr unser Gott sei mit uns (1741) – SATB, ob, str, bc – 4th Sunday after Trinity
- GWV 1145/42: Mein Gott du trägst mich (1742) – SATB, str, bc – 4th Sunday after Trinity
- GWV 1145/43: Mag auch ein Blinder (1743) – SATB, str, bc – 4th Sunday after Trinity
- GWV 1145/44: Mein Herz zieh redliches Erbarmen (1744) – SATB, str, bc – 4th Sunday after Trinity
- GWV 1145/45: Alles was ihr wollet (1745) – SATB, str, bc – 4th Sunday after Trinity
- GWV 1145/47: Mag auch ein Blinder (1747) – SATB, str, bc – 4th Sunday after Trinity
- GWV 1145/48: Ihr Lieben lasset uns untereinander (1748) – SATB, fl (2), fg, str, bc – 4th Sunday after Trinity
- GWV 1145/49: Lauter in der Liebe wandeln (1749) – SATB, fl (2), str, bc – 4th Sunday after Trinity
- GWV 1145/53: Herr wer wird wohnen (1753) – ATB, str, bc – 4th Sunday after Trinity

=== GWV 1146 ===
- GWV 1146/10: Alles ist an Gottes Segen (1710) – B, vl, vl unis, bc – 5th Sunday after Trinity
- GWV 1146/11: Mein Sorgenschiff (1711) – SB, ob (2), fg, vl solo (2), str, bc – 5th Sunday after Trinity
- GWV 1146/24: Fahrt ihr Sinnen auf die Höhe (1724) – SATB, str, bc – 5th Sunday after Trinity
- GWV 1146/28: Wohl dem der den Herren fürchtet (1728) – SATB, ob (2), fg, str, bc – 5th Sunday after Trinity
- GWV 1146/30: In allen meinen Taten (1730) – SATB, str, bc – 5th Sunday after Trinity
- GWV 1146/31: Es ist umsonst dass ihr früh aufsteht (1731) – SATB, fl (2), str, bc – 5th Sunday after Trinity
- GWV 1146/38: Im Schweiss deines Angesichts (1738) – SATB, str, bc – 5th Sunday after Trinity
- GWV 1146/40: Wo Gott zum Haus nicht gibt (1740) – SATBB, ob (2), chal (2)st, fg, hn (2), vl (2), str, bc – 5th Sunday after Trinity
- GWV 1146/41: Der Herr hat unsere Gerechtigkeit hervorgebracht (1741) – SATB, str, bc – 5th Sunday after Trinity
- GWV 1146/42: Wer Jesum hört und wirft seine Netze (1742) – SATB, str, bc – 5th Sunday after Trinity
- GWV 1146/43: Von Jesus kommt mir aller Segen (1743) – SATB, str, bc – 5th Sunday after Trinity
- GWV 1146/44: Enthalte uns dein Wort (1744) – SATB, str, bc – 5th Sunday after Trinity
- GWV 1146/46: Fahre auf in die Höhe (1746) – B, fg, str, bc – 5th Sunday after Trinity
- GWV 1146/47: Vertraue du Gott (1747) – SATB, str, bc – 5th Sunday after Trinity
- GWV 1146/48: Jesus ist die Segensquelle (1748) – SATB, str, bc – 5th Sunday after Trinity
- GWV 1146/49: Wer eine Sache klüglich führet (1749) – SATB, str, bc – 5th Sunday after Trinity

=== GWV 1147 ===
- GWV 1147/11: Vergnügte Ruh beliebte Seelenlust (1711) – S, fl (2), violetta, str (vla (2)), bc – 6th Sunday after Trinity
- GWV 1147/13: Rüste dich mein Geist zu beten (1713) – S, ob (2), str, bc – 6th Sunday after Trinity
- GWV 1147/19: Es sei denn dass eure Gerechtigkeit (1719) – SATB, str, bc – 6th Sunday after Trinity
- GWV 1147/20: Weg verdammtes Sündenleben (1720) – SA, str, bc – 6th Sunday after Trinity
- GWV 1147/22: Segne alle die dir fluchen (1722) – SATB, ob (2), fg, str, bc – 6th Sunday after Trinity
- GWV 1147/24: Leget alles ab von euch (1724) – SATB, str, bc – 6th Sunday after Trinity
- GWV 1147/28: Vergeltet niemand Böses mit Bösem (1728) – SATB, str, bc – 6th Sunday after Trinity
- GWV 1147/32: Bewahre deinen Fuss (1732) – SATB, str, bc – 6th Sunday after Trinity
- GWV 1147/33: Der Gottlosen Opfer ist dem Herrn ein Greuel (1733) – SATB, str, bc – 6th Sunday after Trinity
- GWV 1147/37: Wenn du deine Gabe auf dem Altar (1737) – SATB, str, bc – 6th Sunday after Trinity
- GWV 1147/39: Wehe euch Schriftgelehrten (1739) – SATB, str, bc – 6th Sunday after Trinity
- GWV 1147/40: Vertrag einer den Anderen (1740) – SATB, chal (3)stb, fg, vl, str, bc – 6th Sunday after Trinity
- GWV 1147/41: Alle Schrift von Gott eingegeben ist (1741) – SATB, fl (2), str, bc – 6th Sunday after Trinity
- GWV 1147/42: Der grösste Lehrer Jesus spricht (1742) – SATB, ob, fg, str, bc – 6th Sunday after Trinity
- GWV 1147/43: Ihr stolzen Pharisäer schweigt (1743) – SATB, str, bc – 6th Sunday after Trinity
- GWV 1147/45: Tritt nicht herzu zeuch deine Schuhe (1745) – SATB, str, bc – 6th Sunday after Trinity
- GWV 1147/47: Wehe euch Schriftgelehrten (1747) – SATB, str, bc – 6th Sunday after Trinity
- GWV 1147/48: Der Herr der unter ihnen ist (1748) – SATB, str, bc – 6th Sunday after Trinity
- GWV 1147/49: Alles was einen Fehl hat (1749) – SATB, fl (2), str, bc – 6th Sunday after Trinity
- GWV 1147/53: Zum Gottlosen spricht Gott (1753) – ATB, str, bc – 6th Sunday after Trinity

=== GWV 1148 ===
- GWV 1148/09: Süsser Tod (1709) – SB, vl (2), bc – 7th Sunday after Trinity
- GWV 1148/11: Liebster Gott vergisst du mich (1711) – SATB, ob (2), fg, str, bc – 7th Sunday after Trinity
- GWV 1148/12: Wer sich das Fleisch verführen lässt (1712) – SSATB, ob (2), fg, str, bc – 7th Sunday after Trinity
- GWV 1148/20: Waffne dich mein Geist zu kämpfen (1720) – SA, vl unis, bc – 7th Sunday after Trinity
- GWV 1148/24: Der Herr ist allen gütig (1724) – SAT, str, bc – 7th Sunday after Trinity
- GWV 1148/25: Ermüde nicht mein Geist (1725) – SSATB, ob, str, bc – 7th Sunday after Trinity
- GWV 1148/26: Wie sich ein Vater über seine Kinder erbarmt (1726) – SATB, str, bc – 7th Sunday after Trinity
- GWV 1148/27: Der Herr ist mein getreuer Hirt (1727) – SATB, str, bc – 7th Sunday after Trinity
- GWV 1148/40: Bleibet fest in der brüderlichen Liebe (1740) – SATB, ob (2), fg, vl, str, bc – 7th Sunday after Trinity
- GWV 1148/42: Jesus' Herz ist voll Erbarmen (1742) – SATB, str, bc – 7th Sunday after Trinity
- GWV 1148/44: Wer nur den lieben Gott lässt walten (1744) – SATB, str, bc – 7th Sunday after Trinity
- GWV 1148/45: Seid gastfrei untereinander (1745) – SATB, str, bc – 7th Sunday after Trinity
- GWV 1148/46: Ihr Gläubigen entäussert euch der Sorgen (1746) – T, str, bc – 7th Sunday after Trinity
- GWV 1148/47: Gib dem Volke dass sie essen (1747) – SATB, str, bc – 7th Sunday after Trinity
- GWV 1148/48: Lasset uns doch den Herrn (1748) – SATB, hn (2), (timp (4)), str, bc – 7th Sunday after Trinity
- GWV 1148/49: Alle Kreatur Gottes (1749) – SATB, str, bc – 7th Sunday after Trinity
- GWV 1148/51: Selig sind die Seelen (1751) – ATB, str, bc – 7th Sunday after Trinity
- GWV 1148/52: Es soll geschehen ehe sie rufen (1752) – SATB, fl (2), str, bc – 7th Sunday after Trinity
- GWV 1148/53: Dir sollen dem Herrn danken (1753) – ATB, fl, vl, str, bc – 7th Sunday after Trinity

=== GWV 1149 ===
- GWV 1149/11: Ereifer dich gerechter Himmel (1711) – S, ob (2), str, bc – 8th Sunday after Trinity
- GWV 1149/13: Ihr falschen Heuchelchristen (1713) – B, ob, str, bc – 8th Sunday after Trinity
- GWV 1149/19: Lasset euer Licht leuchten (1719) – B, str, bc – 8th Sunday after Trinity
- GWV 1149/20: Gottlob der Glanz der Freiheit strahlet (1720) – SAT, str, bc – 8th Sunday after Trinity
- GWV 1149/22: Wache sichre Christenschar (1722) – SSATB, str, bc – 8th Sunday after Trinity
- GWV 1149/23: Welche der Geist Gottes treibet (1723) – SSATB, str, bc – 8th Sunday after Trinity
- GWV 1149/24: Ach Gott vom Himmel sieh darein (1724) – ATTB, str, bc – 8th Sunday after Trinity
- GWV 1149/28: Mache dich mein Geist bereit (1728) – SATB, str, bc – 8th Sunday after Trinity
- GWV 1149/31: Dein Wort machet mich klug (1731) – SATB, fl (2), str, bc – 8th Sunday after Trinity
- GWV 1149/32: Ein jeglicher Baum der nicht gute Früchte (1732) – SATB, str, bc – 8th Sunday after Trinity
- GWV 1149/34: Du sagst ich bin ein Christ (1734) – SATB, str, bc – 8th Sunday after Trinity
- GWV 1149/37: Ein jeglicher guter Baum (1737) – SATB, str, bc – 8th Sunday after Trinity
- GWV 1149/40: Ach Seelen wacht der Wolf kommt (1740) – SATB, str, bc – 8th Sunday after Trinity
- GWV 1149/44: Es ist kein guter Baum (1744) – SATB, fl, str, bc – 8th Sunday after Trinity
- GWV 1149/45: Lasset euch niemand verführen (1745) – SATB, str, bc – 8th Sunday after Trinity
- GWV 1149/47: Ein jeglicher Baum wird (1747) – SATB, str, bc – 8th Sunday after Trinity
- GWV 1149/48: Ermuntert euch und wacht (1748) – SATB, str, bc – 8th Sunday after Trinity
- GWV 1149/52: Seid nüchtern und wachet (1752) – SATB, str, bc – 8th Sunday after Trinity
- GWV 1149/53: Der Heiland warnt (1753) – ATB, str, bc – 8th Sunday after Trinity

=== GWV 1150 ===
- GWV 1150/09: Ach wo nun hin (1709) – SATB, str, bc – 9th Sunday after Trinity
- GWV 1150/12: Ein Weltkind sinnet Tag und Nacht (1712) – B, str, bc – 9th Sunday after Trinity
- GWV 1150/16: Führ uns Herr in Versuchung nicht (1716) – SATB, ob (2), fg, str, bc – 9th Sunday after Trinity
- GWV 1150/21: Tu Rechnung Rechnung will Gott (1721) – STB, str, bc – 9th Sunday after Trinity
- GWV 1150/23: Wer sich lässet dünken er stehe (1723) – SATB, str, bc – 9th Sunday after Trinity
- GWV 1150/25: Das Antlitz des Herrn (1725) – SATB, str, bc – 9th Sunday after Trinity
- GWV 1150/26: Machet euch Freunde mit dem ungerechten Mammon (1726) – SATB, fl, str, bc – 9th Sunday after Trinity
- GWV 1150/27: Gott wird alle Werke (1727) – SATB, str, bc – 9th Sunday after Trinity
- GWV 1150/29: Wohl dem der sich des Dürftigen annimmt (1729) – SATB, fl, str, bc – 9th Sunday after Trinity
- GWV 1150/30: Dafür halte uns jedermann (1730) – SATB, fl, str, bc – 9th Sunday after Trinity
- GWV 1150/35: Des Gesetzes Werk ist beschrieben (1735) – SATB, str, bc – 9th Sunday after Trinity
- GWV 1150/40: Macht euch doch mit dem Mammon Freunde (1740) – SATB, str, bc – 9th Sunday after Trinity
- GWV 1150/44: Der Herr schauet vom Himmel (1744) – SATB, str, bc – 9th Sunday after Trinity
- GWV 1150/45: Der grosse Gott der Herr (1745) – SATB, str, bc – 9th Sunday after Trinity
- GWV 1150/46: Machet euch Freunde mit dem ungerechten Mammon (1746) – ATB, str, bc – 9th Sunday after Trinity
- GWV 1150/47: Ihr Gläubigen lernt von der Welt (1747) – SATB, str, bc – 9th Sunday after Trinity
- GWV 1150/49: Wo denkt ihr hin (1749) – ATB, fl (2), str, bc – 9th Sunday after Trinity
- GWV 1150/51: Mein Herz wie hast du Haus gehalten (1751) – ATB, str, bc – 9th Sunday after Trinity
- GWV 1150/52: Irret euch nicht (1752) – SATB, hn (2), str, bc – 9th Sunday after Trinity
- GWV 1150/53a: Du Herr Gott Zebaoth Gott Israel (1753) – ATB, str, bc – 9th Sunday after Trinity
- GWV 1150/53b: Der Wahn der Welt ist schrecklich toll (1753) – ATB, str, bc – 9th Sunday after Trinity

=== GWV 1151 ===
- GWV 1151/13: Wer soll Israel den Armen (1713) – SSATB, ob (2), str, bc – 10th Sunday after Trinity
- GWV 1151/14: Schicket euch in die Zeit (1714) – SATB, ob, vla am, vc, str, bc – 10th Sunday after Trinity
- GWV 1151/19: Mich jammert herzlich (1719) – SATB, str, bc – 10th Sunday after Trinity
- GWV 1151/21: Sehet darauf dass nicht jemand Gottes Gnade (1721) – SSTB, (fl (2)), ob (2), str, bc – 10th Sunday after Trinity
- GWV 1151/22: Seht Jesus weint (1722) – S, str, bc – 10th Sunday after Trinity
- GWV 1151/24: Seht Jesus weint (1724) – SATB, str, bc – 10th Sunday after Trinity
- GWV 1151/26: Bessre dich Jerusalem (1726) – SATB, org, str, bc – 10th Sunday after Trinity
- GWV 1151/28a: Jerusalem fället dahin (1728) – SATB, fl, ob (2), str, bc – 10th Sunday after Trinity
- GWV 1151/28b: Schau hier die Rabenart (1728) – SATB, str, bc – 10th Sunday after Trinity
- GWV 1151/29: Der Herr hat seine Stadt verlassen (1729) – SATB, str, bc – 10th Sunday after Trinity
- GWV 1151/31: Ich eifre mich schier zu Tode (1731) – SATB, str, bc – 10th Sunday after Trinity
- GWV 1151/32: Seht Jesus weint da Salem lacht (1732) – SATB, str, bc – 10th Sunday after Trinity
- GWV 1151/33: Wo viel Gottlose sind (1733) – SATB, str, bc – 10th Sunday after Trinity
- GWV 1151/34: Jesus' Augen stehn voll Tränen (1734) – SATB, fl/ob, str, bc – 10th Sunday after Trinity
- GWV 1151/35: Die Zeit der Heimsuchung ist gekommen (1735) – SATB, str, bc – 10th Sunday after Trinity
- GWV 1151/37: Jesus' Augen stehn voll Tränen (1737) – SATB, ob (2)/chal (2)tb, fg, str, bc – 10th Sunday after Trinity
- GWV 1151/40: Jerusalem fället dahin (1740) – SATB, str, bc – 10th Sunday after Trinity
- GWV 1151/44: Seht Jesus weint ob Salems Sünden (1744) – SATB, str, bc – 10th Sunday after Trinity
- GWV 1151/45: Jesus weint ob Salems Schaden (1745) – SATB, str, bc – 10th Sunday after Trinity
- GWV 1151/46: Gott warum verstössest du uns (1746) – SATB, (ob), str, bc – 10th Sunday after Trinity
- GWV 1151/47: Es steht geschrieben (1747) – SATB, str, bc – 10th Sunday after Trinity
- GWV 1151/52: Seht Zions König weint (1752) – SATB, str, bc – 10th Sunday after Trinity
- GWV 1151/53: Jesus kommt zum Trost der Sünder (1753) – SATB, fl (2), str, bc – 10th Sunday after Trinity

=== GWV 1152 ===
- GWV 1152/09: Treibe doch aus meinem Herzen (1709) – SATB, str, bc – 11th Sunday after Trinity
- GWV 1152/12a: Ich verschmachte fast (1712) – SATB, ob, vl, str, bc – 11th Sunday after Trinity
- GWV 1152/12b: Mein Herz schwimmt in Blut (1712) – S, ob (2), str, bc – 11th Sunday after Trinity
- GWV 1152/16: Gott ist für uns gestorben (1716) – B, fl, ob, str, bc – 11th Sunday after Trinity
- GWV 1152/18: Sehet zu tut rechtschaffne Früchte der Busse (1718) – SSATB, ob, str, bc – 11th Sunday after Trinity
- GWV 1152/20: Gottlob mein Glaube stehet feste (1720) – B, vl unis, bc – 11th Sunday after Trinity
- GWV 1152/21: Wer seine Missetat leugnet (1721) – ST, (fl/violetta), str, bc – 11th Sunday after Trinity
- GWV 1152/23: Das Wort vom Kreuz ist eine Torheit (1723) – SATB, str, bc – 11th Sunday after Trinity
- GWV 1152/25: Der Herr übet Gewalt (1725) – SSAT, str, bc – 11th Sunday after Trinity
- GWV 1152/26: Ach grosser Gott mein Herz (1726) – SATB, str, bc – 11th Sunday after Trinity
- GWV 1152/27: Kommet her und sehet die Werke (1727) – SATB, str, bc – 11th Sunday after Trinity
- GWV 1152/30: Herr Jesu Christ du höchstes Gut (1730) – SATB, str, bc – 11th Sunday after Trinity
- GWV 1152/35: So halten wir es nun (1735) – SATB, str, bc – 11th Sunday after Trinity
- GWV 1152/36: Dies Volk ehret mich mit den Lippen (1736) – SATB, str, bc – 11th Sunday after Trinity
- GWV 1152/40: Kommt wir wollen wieder zum Herrn (1740) – ATB, str, bc – 11th Sunday after Trinity
- GWV 1152/43: Vater schau ich fall'zu Fusse (1743) – SATB, fg, str, bc – 11th Sunday after Trinity
- GWV 1152/44: Wer seine Missetat leugnet (1744) – SATB, str, bc – 11th Sunday after Trinity
- GWV 1152/45: Alle die sich demütigen (1745) – SATB, str, bc – 11th Sunday after Trinity
- GWV 1152/46: Ach Herr mich armen Sünder (1746) – B, str, bc – 11th Sunday after Trinity
- GWV 1152/49: Der Herr ist nahe bei denen (1749) – SATB, str, bc – 11th Sunday after Trinity
- GWV 1152/51: Herr Jesu Christ du höchstes Gut (1751) – ATB, str, bc – 11th Sunday after Trinity
- GWV 1152/53a: Die Opfer die Gott gefallen (1753) – SATB, hn (2), str, bc – 11th Sunday after Trinity
- GWV 1152/53b: Herr grosser Gott ach sieh doch (1753) – SATB, fl (2), hn (2), str, bc – 11th Sunday after Trinity

=== GWV 1153 ===
- GWV 1153/09a: Mich überfällt mein Kreuz (1709) – SATB, str (vla (2)), bc – 12th Sunday after Trinity
- GWV 1153/09b: Ach was soll ich Sünder machen (1709) – SB, str, bc – 12th Sunday after Trinity
- GWV 1153/13: Was Gott tut das ist wohlgetan (1713) – SATB, ob (2), str, bc – 12th Sunday after Trinity
- GWV 1153/14: Der Herr hat alles wohlgemacht (1714) – SSATB, ob (2), str, bc – 12th Sunday after Trinity
- GWV 1153/16: Gottes Kraft ist in den Schwachen (1716) – SATB, ob (2), str, bc – 12th Sunday after Trinity
- GWV 1153/19: Wir sind krank (1719) – SSATB, str, bc – 12th Sunday after Trinity
- GWV 1153/21: Gelobet sei der Herr täglich (1721) – SSTB, str, bc – 12th Sunday after Trinity
- GWV 1153/23: Nicht uns Herr (1723) – SSATB, org, str, bc – 12th Sunday after Trinity
- GWV 1153/24: Ach Jesu heile doch die Plagen (1724) – SATB, str, bc – 12th Sunday after Trinity
- GWV 1153/25: Freuet euch mit den Fröhlichen (1725) – SSAT, str, bc – 12th Sunday after Trinity
- GWV 1153/27: Meine Kindlein lasset uns nicht lieben (1727) – SATB, str, bc – 12th Sunday after Trinity
- GWV 1153/29: Habe deine Lust an dem Herrn (1729) – SATB, fg, str, bc – 12th Sunday after Trinity
- GWV 1153/31: Ich hoffe darauf dass du so gnädig bist (1731) – SATB, str, bc – 12th Sunday after Trinity
- GWV 1153/32: Das Verlangen der Elenden hörest du Herr (1732) – SATB, str, bc – 12th Sunday after Trinity
- GWV 1153/33: Tue deinen Mund auf für die Stummen (1733) – ATB, str, bc – 12th Sunday after Trinity
- GWV 1153/34: Selig sind die aus Erbarmen (1734) – SATB, str, bc – 12th Sunday after Trinity
- GWV 1153/35: Singet dem Herrn ein neues Lied (1735) – SATB, fl/ob (2), str, bc – 12th Sunday after Trinity
- GWV 1153/40: Gebet unserm Gott allein die Ehre (1740) – ATB, str, bc – 12th Sunday after Trinity
- GWV 1153/41: Jesu rege mein Gemüte (1741) – ATB, ob (2), str, bc – 12th Sunday after Trinity
- GWV 1153/43: Ach welchen Jammer bringt die Sünde (1743) – SATB, str, bc – 12th Sunday after Trinity
- GWV 1153/44: Mein Jesus seufzet (1744) – SATB, str, bc – 12th Sunday after Trinity
- GWV 1153/45: So ermahne ich nun (1745) – SATB, (ob), str, bc – 12th Sunday after Trinity
- GWV 1153/46: Wer ist der gut Leben begehret (1746) – ATB, str, bc – 12th Sunday after Trinity
- GWV 1153/47: Er hat alles wohl gemacht (1747) – SATB, str, bc – 12th Sunday after Trinity
- GWV 1153/53: Höchster Formierer (1753) – SATB, fl (2), hn (2), str, bc – 12th Sunday after Trinity

=== GWV 1154 ===
- GWV 1154/09a: Alle eure Dinge (1709) – SATB, vc, str, bc – 13th Sunday after Trinity
- GWV 1154/09b: Meine Seufzer meine Klagen (1709) – SATB, str, bc – 13th Sunday after Trinity
- GWV 1154/12a: Das Christentum so Gott gefallen soll (1712) – S, ob (2), fg, str, bc – 13th Sunday after Trinity
- GWV 1154/12b: Zähle meine Flucht (1712) – B, (fg), vl, str, bc – 13th Sunday after Trinity
- GWV 1154/20: Lass deinen Stolz (1720) – B, str, bc – 13th Sunday after Trinity
- GWV 1154/23: So halten wir es nun (1723) – SATB, fg, str, bc – 13th Sunday after Trinity
- GWV 1154/25: O Gottes Sohn von Ewigkeit (1725) – SSAT, ob (2), fg, str, bc – 13th Sunday after Trinity
- GWV 1154/26: Du sollst Gott deinen Herrn lieben (1726) – SATB, rec, fl (2), str, bc – 13th Sunday after Trinity
- GWV 1154/27: Fröhliche Stunden (1727) – SAT, fl/ob, str, bc – 13th Sunday after Trinity
- GWV 1154/30: Eure Rede sei allezeit lieblich (1730) – SAT(B), str, bc – 13th Sunday after Trinity
- GWV 1154/36: O Gottes Sohn von Ewigkeit (1736) – SATB, fl, chal (2)tb, fg, str, bc – 13th Sunday after Trinity
- GWV 1154/38: Meine Kindlein lasset uns nicht lieben (1738) – SATB, str, bc – 13th Sunday after Trinity
- GWV 1154/39: Wer Ohren hat zu hören höre (1739) – SATB, chalb/fg, str, bc – 13th Sunday after Trinity
- GWV 1154/40: So jemand spricht ich liebe Gott (1740) – ATB, str, bc – 13th Sunday after Trinity
- GWV 1154/41: Ringet danach dass ihr durch die enge Pforte (1741) – ATB, ob (2), fg, vl, str, bc – 13th Sunday after Trinity
- GWV 1154/42: Wer Jesum liebt (1742) – ATB, str, bc – 13th Sunday after Trinity
- GWV 1154/43: Selig sind deine Männer (1743) – SATB, str, bc – 13th Sunday after Trinity
- GWV 1154/46: Ach Jesu wir sind wund (1746) – ATB, str, bc – 13th Sunday after Trinity
- GWV 1154/48: Selig sind deine Leute (1748) – SATB, hn (2), str, bc – 13th Sunday after Trinity
- GWV 1154/49: Wandelt in der Liebe (1749) – SATB, str, bc – 13th Sunday after Trinity
- GWV 1154/53: Ach dass die Hülfe aus Zion über Israel käme (1753) – SATB, fl (2), hn (2), str, bc – 13th Sunday after Trinity

=== GWV 1155 ===
- GWV 1155/09a: Wo willst du hin betrübte Seele (1709) – SB, (ob), str (vla (2)), bc – 14th Sunday after Trinity
- GWV 1155/09b: Die Krankheit so mich drückt (1709) – S, (ob), str (vla (2)), bc – 14th Sunday after Trinity
- GWV 1155/13: Undankbarvolle Welt (1713) – SSSTB, ob (2), str, bc – 14th Sunday after Trinity
- GWV 1155/16: Mein Gott woran liegts doch (1716) – S, fl (2), str, bc – 14th Sunday after Trinity
- GWV 1155/19: Jesu lieber Meister (1719) – SSATB, str, bc – 14th Sunday after Trinity
- GWV 1155/22: Rufe Gott im Leiden an (1722) – SATB, ob, str, bc – 14th Sunday after Trinity
- GWV 1155/24: Erfreue uns wieder (1724) – SATB, org (?), str, bc – 14th Sunday after Trinity
- GWV 1155/25: Lasset uns hinzutreten zum Gnadenstuhl (1725) – SATB, ob (2), str, bc – 14th Sunday after Trinity
- GWV 1155/28: Gelobet sei der Herr täglich (1728) – SATB, str, bc – 14th Sunday after Trinity
- GWV 1155/29: Opfre Gott Dank und bezahle (1729) – SATB, str, bc – 14th Sunday after Trinity
- GWV 1155/31: Opfre Gott Dank und bezahle (1731) – SATB, fl (2), str, bc – 14th Sunday after Trinity
- GWV 1155/32: Ach Gott wie elend sind wir dran (1732) – SATB, str, bc – 14th Sunday after Trinity
- GWV 1155/33: Wer seine Ohren verstopfet (1733) – SATB, str, bc – 14th Sunday after Trinity
- GWV 1155/34: Der Herr höret die Armen (1734) – SATB, str, bc – 14th Sunday after Trinity
- GWV 1155/35: Das ist ein köstlich Ding (1735) – SATB, str, bc – 14th Sunday after Trinity
- GWV 1155/36: Es ist eine Art (1736) – SAT, ob (2), fg, str, bc – 14th Sunday after Trinity
- GWV 1155/37: Wehe mir dass ich ein Fremdling bin (1737) – SATB, str, bc – 14th Sunday after Trinity
- GWV 1155/39: Erbarm dich mein o Herre Gott (1739) – SATB, str, bc – 14th Sunday after Trinity
- GWV 1155/40: Liebet eure Feinde so wird euer Lohn (1740) – SATB, str, bc – 14th Sunday after Trinity
- GWV 1155/41: Jesus' Liebe heilt die Kranken (1741) – ATB, ob (2), fg, str, bc – 14th Sunday after Trinity
- GWV 1155/42: Wo bleiben denn die Neune (1742) – SATB, ob, str, bc – 14th Sunday after Trinity
- GWV 1155/43: Erbarm dich mein o Herre Gott (1743) – SATB, str, bc – 14th Sunday after Trinity
- GWV 1155/45: Wer Dank opfert der preiset mich (1745) – SATB, str, bc – 14th Sunday after Trinity

=== GWV 1156 ===
- GWV 1156/09: Wer nur den lieben Gott lässt walten (1709) – SATB, str, bc – 15th Sunday after Trinity
- GWV 1156/23: So wir im Geiste leben (1723) – SATB, (fl(2)), str, bc – 15th Sunday after Trinity
- GWV 1156/26: Sorget nicht für den andern Morgen (1726) – SATB, fl (2), fg, str, bc – 15th Sunday after Trinity
- GWV 1156/27: Befiehl du deine Wege (1727) – SAT, str, bc – 15th Sunday after Trinity
- GWV 1156/38: Du bist ein Mensch (1738) – SATB, chal (3)atb, str, bc – 15th Sunday after Trinity
- GWV 1156/39: Ihr sollt nicht sorgen (1739) – SATB, str, bc – 15th Sunday after Trinity
- GWV 1156/40: Lasset uns doch den Herrn (1740) – SATB, ob (2), str, bc – 15th Sunday after Trinity
- GWV 1156/41: Dass Gott sei ist ihnen offenbar (1741) – SATB, str, bc – 15th Sunday after Trinity
- GWV 1156/42: Die Liebe leidet nicht Gesellen (1742) – ATB, str, bc – 15th Sunday after Trinity
- GWV 1156/43: Ihr Menschen richtet euch empor (1743) – SATB, str, bc – 15th Sunday after Trinity
- GWV 1156/46: Sehet die Vögel unter dem Himmel (1746) – SATB, str, bc – 15th Sunday after Trinity
- GWV 1156/47: Die Himmel erzählen die Ehre Gottes (1747) – SAB, str, bc – 15th Sunday after Trinity
- GWV 1156/48: Herr wie sind deine Werke so gross (1748) – SATB, (fl (2)), hn (2), str, bc – 15th Sunday after Trinity
- GWV 1156/49: Von Gott will ich nicht lassen (1749) – SATB, fl (2), hn (2), str, bc – 15th Sunday after Trinity
- GWV 1156/53: Befiehl dem Herrn deine Wege (1753) – SATB, fl (2), str, bc – 15th Sunday after Trinity

=== GWV 1157 ===
- GWV 1157/09a: Der Mensch vom Weibe geboren (1709) – SATB, str, bc – 16th Sunday after Trinity
- GWV 1157/09b: Bestelle dein Haus (1709) – SATB, str, bc – 16th Sunday after Trinity
- GWV 1157/13: Ach Herr lehr mich bedenken (1713) – S, ob (2), org, str, bc – 16th Sunday after Trinity
- GWV 1157/16: Wenn man meinen Jammer wäget (1716) – SSATB, str, bc – 16th Sunday after Trinity
- GWV 1157/21: Ach Herr lehr uns bedenken wohl (1721) – SATB, ob, str, bc – 16th Sunday after Trinity
- GWV 1157/24: Gott eilet mit den Seinen (1724) – SATB, ob am, str, bc – 16th Sunday after Trinity
- GWV 1157/25: Ach Sterbliche bedenkt das Ende (1725) – SSATB, fl (2), ob (2), vla am, str, bc – 16th Sunday after Trinity
- GWV 1157/27: Alles Fleisch ist wie Gras (1727) – SAT, str, bc – 16th Sunday after Trinity
- GWV 1157/28: Ach wie nichtig ach wie flüchtig (1728) – SATB, ob (2), str, bc – 16th Sunday after Trinity
- GWV 1157/29: O süsses Wort das Jesus spricht (1729) – SAT(B), str, bc – 16th Sunday after Trinity
- GWV 1157/31: Ein Mensch ist in seinem Leben wie Gras (1731) – SATB, str, bc – 16th Sunday after Trinity
- GWV 1157/32: O süsses Wort das Jesus spricht (1732) – SATB, str, bc – 16th Sunday after Trinity
- GWV 1157/33: Rühme dich nicht des morgenden Tags (1733) – SATB, fl, str, bc – 16th Sunday after Trinity
- GWV 1157/34: Lass die Weinenden nicht ohne Trost (1734) – SATB, str, bc – 16th Sunday after Trinity
- GWV 1157/35: Ihr werdet traurig sein (1735) – SATB, str, bc – 16th Sunday after Trinity
- GWV 1157/37: Es begab sich dass Jesus (1737) – SATB, chal (2)tb, str, bc – 16th Sunday after Trinity
- GWV 1157/39: Deine Toten werden leben (1739) – SATB, str, bc – 16th Sunday after Trinity
- GWV 1157/40: Wie gar nichts sind alle Menschen (1740) – SATB, ob (2), chals, fg, vl, vla (2), str, bc – 16th Sunday after Trinity
- GWV 1157/41: Was ist der Mensch ein Erdenkloss (1741) – SATB, ob, vl (2), str, bc – 16th Sunday after Trinity
- GWV 1157/42: Sagt was sind doch unsre Tage (1742) – ATB, ob (2), fg, str, bc – 16th Sunday after Trinity
- GWV 1157/43: Unser Leben fähret dahin (1743) – SATB, str, bc – 16th Sunday after Trinity
- GWV 1157/45: Wer weiss wie nahe mir mein Ende (1745) – SATB, str, bc – 16th Sunday after Trinity
- GWV 1157/47: Du hast deinem Volk (1747) – SAB, str, bc – 16th Sunday after Trinity

=== GWV 1158 ===
- GWV 1158/12: Wer sich aus Hochmut selbst erhöht (1712) – S, fg, vl (2), bc – 17th Sunday after Trinity
- GWV 1158/16: Vertraget einer den Andern (1716) – SSATB, str, bc – 17th Sunday after Trinity
- GWV 1158/19: Gedenke des Sabbattages (1719) – B, vl (2), bc – 17th Sunday after Trinity
- GWV 1158/26: Lauert nur ihr Otterschlangen (1726) – SATB, str, bc – 17th Sunday after Trinity
- GWV 1158/27: Beschliesset einen Rat (1727) – SAT, str, bc – 17th Sunday after Trinity
- GWV 1158/33: Der Gerechte hält sich weislich (1733) – SATB, fl, str, bc – 17th Sunday after Trinity
- GWV 1158/36: Der Gottlose lauert im Verborgenen (1736) – SATB, fl (2), ob (2), fg (2), str, bc – 17th Sunday after Trinity
- GWV 1158/40: Habt einerlei Sinn untereinander (1740) – SATB, ob (2), str, bc – 17th Sunday after Trinity
- GWV 1158/41: Sehet zu dass niemand Böses (1741) – SATB, str, bc – 17th Sunday after Trinity
- GWV 1158/42: Mein Heiland deiner Tugend Licht (1742) – SATB, ob, str, bc – 17th Sunday after Trinity
- GWV 1158/43: Der Schönste unter Menschenkindern (1743) – SATB, str, bc – 17th Sunday after Trinity
- GWV 1158/44: Lasset euer Licht leuchten (1744) – SATB, str, bc – 17th Sunday after Trinity
- GWV 1158/45: Seid ohne Tadel (1745) – SAB, str, bc – 17th Sunday after Trinity
- GWV 1158/46: Gedenke des Sabbattages (1746) – SATB, str, bc – 17th Sunday after Trinity
- GWV 1158/48: Haltet meinen Sabbat (1748) – SATB, str, bc – 17th Sunday after Trinity
- GWV 1158/49: Die Feinde wollen Jesum fangen (1749) – SATB, fl (2), hn (2), str, bc – 17th Sunday after Trinity
- GWV 1158/53: Gott sei mir gnädig denn Menschen wollen (1753) – SATB, str, bc – 17th Sunday after Trinity

=== GWV 1159 ===
- GWV 1159/12a: Erforsche mich Gott und erfahre mein Herz (1712) – SB, ob (2), str, bc – 18th Sunday after Trinity
- GWV 1159/12b: Lass uns in deiner Liebe (1712) – B, ob, str, bc – 18th Sunday after Trinity
- GWV 1159/13: Ich liebe Jesum voller Freuden (1713) – SATB, ob (2), str, bc – 18th Sunday after Trinity
- GWV 1159/19: Die Hauptsumma des Gebots ist Liebe (1719) – SATB, str, bc – 18th Sunday after Trinity
- GWV 1159/23: Gott ist treu (1723) – SATB, ob (2), str, bc – 18th Sunday after Trinity
- GWV 1159/24: Suchet in der Schrift (1724) – SATB, fl, vl, str, bc – 18th Sunday after Trinity
- GWV 1159/29: Wer nach Gottes Wort fraget (1729) – SATB, fl, fg, str, bc – 18th Sunday after Trinity
- GWV 1159/31: Wohl den Menschen die dich (1731) – SATB, str, bc – 18th Sunday after Trinity
- GWV 1159/32: Wir haben erkannt und geglaubet (1732) – SATB, str, bc – 18th Sunday after Trinity
- GWV 1159/33: Wer fähret hinauf gen Himmel (1733) – SATB, str, bc – 18th Sunday after Trinity
- GWV 1159/34: Jesus hat die rechte Lehre (1734) – SATB, str, bc – 18th Sunday after Trinity
- GWV 1159/35: Wenn einer alle Ding' verstünd' (1735) – SATB, str, bc – 18th Sunday after Trinity
- GWV 1159/37: Der Herr hat gesagt zu meinem Herrn (1737) – SATB, str, bc – 18th Sunday after Trinity
- GWV 1159/40: Herr Christ der einig Gottes Sohn (1740) – SATB, (fl), ob (2), fg, str, bc – 18th Sunday after Trinity
- GWV 1159/41: Vater die Stunde ist hier (1741) – SATB, str, bc – 18th Sunday after Trinity
- GWV 1159/42: Wenn einer alle Ding' verstünd' (1742) – SATB, str, bc – 18th Sunday after Trinity
- GWV 1159/43: Die Welt weiss jetzo viel zu fragen (1743) – SATB, str, bc – 18th Sunday after Trinity
- GWV 1159/44: O Jesus Christ mein höchstes Licht (1744) – SATB, str, bc – 18th Sunday after Trinity
- GWV 1159/45: Alle Schrift von Gott eingegeben ist (1745) – SATB, str, bc – 18th Sunday after Trinity
- GWV 1159/47: Der Herr sprach zu meinem Herrn (1747) – SAB, fl (2), hn (2), str, bc – 18th Sunday after Trinity

=== GWV 1160 ===
- GWV 1160/12a: Dein Schade ist verzweifelt böse (1712) – SB, ob (2), str, bc – 19th Sunday after Trinity
- GWV 1160/12b: Gott lege doch in meinen Mund (1712) – B, ob (2), str, bc – 19th Sunday after Trinity
- GWV 1160/21: Gott ist Zeuge (1721) – SSATB, ob (2), str, bc – 19th Sunday after Trinity
- GWV 1160/26: Ach grosser Helfer (1726) – SATB, fl (2), str, bc – 19th Sunday after Trinity
- GWV 1160/28: Siehe um Trost war mir sehr bange (1728) – SATB, str, bc – 19th Sunday after Trinity
- GWV 1160/33: Wer seine Missetat leugnet (1733) – SATB, str, bc – 19th Sunday after Trinity
- GWV 1160/36: Gott kennt und siehet die Gedanken (1736) – SATB, (fl/ob), fg, str, bc – 19th Sunday after Trinity
- GWV 1160/38: Der Herr weiss alle Dinge (1738) – SATB, str, bc – 19th Sunday after Trinity
- GWV 1160/40: Lass der Gottlosen Bosheit ein Ende werden (1740) – SATB, str, bc – 19th Sunday after Trinity
- GWV 1160/41: Tröste uns Gott unser Heiland (1741) – SATB, str, bc – 19th Sunday after Trinity
- GWV 1160/42: Ich werfe mich zu deinen Füssen (1742) – SATB, ob, str, bc – 19th Sunday after Trinity
- GWV 1160/43: Gott du erhörest Gebet (1743) – SATB, str, bc – 19th Sunday after Trinity
- GWV 1160/44: Das Verlangen der Elenden hörest du Herr (1744) – SATB, fg, str, bc – 19th Sunday after Trinity
- GWV 1160/46: Herr Jesu Christ du höchstes Gut (1746) – SATB, str, bc – 19th Sunday after Trinity
- GWV 1160/48: Der Herr vergibt die Sünden (1748) – SATB, str, bc – 19th Sunday after Trinity
- GWV 1160/49: Ist jemand in Christo (1749) – SATB, str, bc – 19th Sunday after Trinity
- GWV 1160/53: Wohl dem dem die Übertretungen vergeben sind (1753) – SATB, fg, str, bc – 19th Sunday after Trinity

=== GWV 1161 ===
- GWV 1161/13: Ich will mich mit dir verloben (1713) – SB, ob (2), str, bc – 20th Sunday after Trinity
- GWV 1161/16: Mein Herz singt und spielt (1716) – SATBB, ob (2), str, bc – 20th Sunday after Trinity
- GWV 1161/19: Der Bräutigam kommt (1719) – SATB, str, bc – 20th Sunday after Trinity
- GWV 1161/21: Wir ermahnen euch als Mithelfer (1721) – SSATB, ob, str, bc – 20th Sunday after Trinity
- GWV 1161/22: Gott lässt aus lauter Gnade (1722) – B, str, bc – 20th Sunday after Trinity
- GWV 1161/23: Seid klug wie die Schlangen (1723) – SATB, str, bc – 20th Sunday after Trinity
- GWV 1161/25: Gott erbarmt sich armer Sünder (1725) – SSATB, ob (2), str, bc – 20th Sunday after Trinity
- GWV 1161/27: Wie lieblich sind die Füsse derer (1727) – SAT, fl (2), ob (2), fg, str, bc – 20th Sunday after Trinity
- GWV 1161/29: Höre Tochter schaue drauf (1729) – SATB, str, bc – 20th Sunday after Trinity
- GWV 1161/31: Kommet her sehet an die Werke (1731) – SATB, str, bc – 20th Sunday after Trinity
- GWV 1161/32: Ich will in den Städten Juda (1732) – SATB, str, bc – 20th Sunday after Trinity
- GWV 1161/33: Das Schrecken des Königes ist wie das Brüllen (1733) – SATBB, str, bc – 20th Sunday after Trinity
- GWV 1161/34: Kommt her zu mir spricht Gottes Sohn (1734) – SATB, ob am (fl), vl unis, vla, bc – 20th Sunday after Trinity
- GWV 1161/35: Siehe meine Mahlzeit habe ich bereitet (1735) – SATB, str, bc – 20th Sunday after Trinity
- GWV 1161/37: Gott du labest die Elenden (1737) – SAT, fg, str, bc – 20th Sunday after Trinity
- GWV 1161/39: Ihr Menschen hört Gott ladet euch (1739) – SATB, str, bc – 20th Sunday after Trinity
- GWV 1161/40: Wer wird auf des Herren Berg (1740) – SATB, str, bc – 20th Sunday after Trinity
- GWV 1161/41: Ihr Menschen hört (1741) – SATB, str, bc – 20th Sunday after Trinity
- GWV 1161/42: Der grosse Gott will seinen Sohn (1742) – SATB, str, bc – 20th Sunday after Trinity
- GWV 1161/43: Herr Gott Vater mein starker Held (1743) – SATB, str, bc – 20th Sunday after Trinity
- GWV 1161/45: Auf schmücket euch (1745) – SATB, str, bc – 20th Sunday after Trinity
- GWV 1161/47: Kommt seht doch Gottes Freundlichkeit (1747) – SAT, str, bc – 20th Sunday after Trinity

=== GWV 1162 ===
- GWV 1162/09: Siehe selig ist der Mensch (1709) – SB, ob (2), (fg), str, bc – 21st Sunday after Trinity
- GWV 1162/12: Verzage nicht wenn gleich (1712) – S, ob (2), str, bc – 21st Sunday after Trinity
- GWV 1162/20: Auf ihr Christen auf zum Streit (1720) – SSTB, str, bc – 21st Sunday after Trinity
- GWV 1162/26: Alle Züchtigung wenn sie da ist dünket sie uns nicht Freude (1726) – B, fl (2), str, bc – 21st Sunday after Trinity
- GWV 1162/27: Die Wege des Herrn sind eitel Güte (1727) – SAT, str, bc – 21st Sunday after Trinity
- GWV 1162/30: Wenn wir in höchsten Nöten sein (1730) – SATB, str, bc – 21st Sunday after Trinity
- GWV 1162/36: Jesu Retter in der Not (1736) – SATB, str, bc – 21st Sunday after Trinity
- GWV 1162/38: Wohl dem der den Herrn fürchtet (1738) – SATB, chal (3)atb, str, bc – 21st Sunday after Trinity
- GWV 1162/39: Welchen der Herr lieb hat (1739) – SATTB, ob, fg, str, bc – 21st Sunday after Trinity
- GWV 1162/40: Denen die berufen sind (1740) – SATB, str, bc – 21st Sunday after Trinity
- GWV 1162/41: Ein Vater lernt sein Haus besorgen (1741) – SATB, str, bc – 21st Sunday after Trinity
- GWV 1162/42a: Des Glaubenstrieb ist stets geschäftig (1742) – SATB, str, bc – 21st Sunday after Trinity
- GWV 1162/42b: Ach Herr Gott wie reich (1742) – SATB, ob, str, bc – 21st Sunday after Trinity
- GWV 1162/43: Was hilfts lieben Brüder (1743) – SATB, str, bc – 21st Sunday after Trinity
- GWV 1162/46: Wenn ihr nicht Zeichen und Wunder (1746) – SATB, str, bc – 21st Sunday after Trinity
- GWV 1162/48: Lasset uns laufen durch Geduld (1748) – SATB, str, bc – 21st Sunday after Trinity
- GWV 1162/49: So jemand die Seinen nicht versorgt (1749) – SATB, fl (2), str, bc – 21st Sunday after Trinity
- GWV 1162/50: Der Name des Herrn (1750) – SATB, ob, hn (2), str, bc – 21st Sunday after Trinity
- GWV 1162/51: Ich habe für dich gebeten (1751) – SATB, str, bc – 21st Sunday after Trinity
- GWV 1162/53: Gelobet sei der Herr täglich (1753) – SATB, fl (2), chal (2)tb, fg (2), hn (2), str, bc – 21st Sunday after Trinity

=== GWV 1163 ===
- GWV 1163/09: Ach Gott will ins Gerichte gehen (1709) – SATB, ob (2), fg, str, bc – 22nd Sunday after Trinity
- GWV 1163/13: Mein Sünd' mich werden kränken sehr (1713) – ATB, ob (2), str, bc – 22nd Sunday after Trinity
- GWV 1163/14: Nahet euch zu Gott (1714) – SSATB, ob (2), str, bc – 22nd Sunday after Trinity
- GWV 1163/16: Dein Wort lass mich bekennen (1716) – SATB, str, bc – 22nd Sunday after Trinity
- GWV 1163/19: Tue Rechnung von deinem Haushalten (1719) – SATB, str, bc – 22nd Sunday after Trinity
- GWV 1163/20: Ach Jesu Quelle aller Gnaden (1720) – S, str, bc – 22nd Sunday after Trinity
- GWV 1163/21: Lass uns miteinander rechten (1721) – SATB, (fg), str, bc – 22nd Sunday after Trinity
- GWV 1163/22: Unsre Schuld vor Gott ist gross (1722) – B, ob (2), str, bc – 22nd Sunday after Trinity
- GWV 1163/23: Gott ist's der in euch wirket (1723) – SATB, vla am?, str, bc – 22nd Sunday after Trinity
- GWV 1163/24: Erbarm dich mein o Herre Gott (1724) – SATB, fl, str, bc – 22nd Sunday after Trinity
- GWV 1163/25: Herr Gott barmherzig und gnädig (1725) – SATB, fl (2), ob (2), fg, str, bc – 22nd Sunday after Trinity
- GWV 1163/27: Erschrecke sichre Welt (1727) – SAT, str, bc – 22nd Sunday after Trinity
- GWV 1163/28: Gott rechnet ach was soll ich machen (1728) – SATB, str, bc – 22nd Sunday after Trinity
- GWV 1163/31: Herr erhöre mein Gebet (1731) – SATB, str, bc – 22nd Sunday after Trinity
- GWV 1163/32: Aus tiefer Not schrei ich zu dir (1732) – SATB, str, bc – 22nd Sunday after Trinity
- GWV 1163/33: Durch Güte und Treue wird Missetat versöhnet (1733) – SATB, fl, str, bc – 22nd Sunday after Trinity
- GWV 1163/34: Seid barmherzig wie auch euer Vater (1734) – SATBB, ob (2), chalb, str, bc – 22nd Sunday after Trinity
- GWV 1163/35: Barmherzig und gnädig ist der Herr (1735) – SATB, vla, str, bc – 22nd Sunday after Trinity
- GWV 1163/37: Mache dich los von deinen Sünden (1737) – SATB, fl, ob (2), chal (2)tb, fg, str, bc – 22nd Sunday after Trinity
- GWV 1163/39: Ach was hab ich ausgerichtet (1739) – SATB, ob am (2), str, bc – 22nd Sunday after Trinity
- GWV 1163/40: Vergib deinem Nächsten (1740) – SATB, str, bc – 22nd Sunday after Trinity
- GWV 1163/41: Du gewaltiger Herrscher richtest (1741) – SATB, str, bc – 22nd Sunday after Trinity
- GWV 1163/43: Gott stellt mit Knechten Rechnung an (1743) – SATB, str, bc – 22nd Sunday after Trinity
- GWV 1163/45: Vergib deinem Nächsten (1745) – SATB, str, bc – 22nd Sunday after Trinity
- GWV 1163/47: Du Schalksknecht alle diese Schuld (1747) – SAT, str, bc – 22nd Sunday after Trinity
- GWV 1163/53: Weh mir dass ich so oft (1753) – SATB, str, bc – 22nd Sunday after Trinity

=== GWV 1164 ===
- GWV 1164/12: Unsre Losung Gott mit uns (1712) – S, ob (2), bc – 23rd Sunday after Trinity
- GWV 1164/20: Du edles Kleinod jener Höhen (1720) – B, str, bc – 23rd Sunday after Trinity
- GWV 1164/26: Wo Gott der Herr nicht bei uns hält (1726) – SATB, str, bc – 23rd Sunday after Trinity
- GWV 1164/27: Der Herr machet zunichte (1727) – SAT, str, bc – 23rd Sunday after Trinity
- GWV 1164/38: Seid untertan aller menschlicher Ordnung (1738) – SATB, ob (3), fg, str, bc – 23rd Sunday after Trinity
- GWV 1164/39: Meister wir wissen (1739) – SATB, str, bc – 23rd Sunday after Trinity
- GWV 1164/40: Kommt hört Jesus Lehre an (1740) – SATB, str, bc – 23rd Sunday after Trinity
- GWV 1164/41: Der Gottlose lauert auf den Gerechten (1741) – SATB, ob, str, bc – 23rd Sunday after Trinity
- GWV 1164/43: Schlecht und recht behüten mich (1743) – SATB, str, bc – 23rd Sunday after Trinity
- GWV 1164/46: Wie wir getragen haben das Bild (1746) – SATB, str, bc – 23rd Sunday after Trinity
- GWV 1164/47: Wehe denen die verborgen sein wollen (1747) – SATB, fl (2), str, bc – 23rd Sunday after Trinity
- GWV 1164/48: Jesus ist der beste Lehrer (1748) – SATB, chal (2)ab, fg (2), hn (2), str, bc – 23rd Sunday after Trinity
- GWV 1164/50: Die Anschläge des Argen (1750) – SATB, hn (2), str, bc – 23rd Sunday after Trinity
- GWV 1164/51: Warum toben die Heiden und die Leute (1751) – SATB, hn (2), str, bc – 23rd Sunday after Trinity
- GWV 1164/53a: Errette mich Herr (1753) – SATB, hn (2), str, bc – 23rd Sunday after Trinity
- GWV 1164/53b: Wie schön wie herrlich klingt es nicht (1753) – SATB, ob, hn (2), str, bc – 23rd Sunday after Trinity

=== GWV 1165 ===
- GWV 1165/09: Diese Zeit ist ein Spiel der Eitelkeit (1709) – S, fg, str, bc – 24th Sunday after Trinity
- GWV 1165/13: Komm o Tod du Schlafes Bruder (1713) – SATB, ob, str, bc – 24th Sunday after Trinity
- GWV 1165/16: Wachset in der Erkenntnis Gottes (1716) – SATB, ob (2), str, bc – 24th Sunday after Trinity
- GWV 1165/19: Hoffen wir allein in diesem Leben (1719) – SATB, str, bc – 24th Sunday after Trinity
- GWV 1165/21: Herzlich tut mich verlangen (1721) – SSATB, (fl (2)), ob (2), hn (2), violetta (2), str, bc – 24th Sunday after Trinity
- GWV 1165/22: Krankheit Jammer Angst und Not (1722) – SSATB, ob (2), str, bc – 24th Sunday after Trinity
- GWV 1165/23: Danksaget dem Vater der uns tüchtig gemacht hat (1723) – SATB, str, bc – 24th Sunday after Trinity
- GWV 1165/24: Wir haben einen Gott der da hilft (1724) – SSATB, str, bc – 24th Sunday after Trinity
- GWV 1165/25: Werter Jesu ach wie lange (1725) – SATB, ob (3), fg, str, bc – 24th Sunday after Trinity
- GWV 1165/27: Aus tiefer Not schrei ich zu dir (1727) – SAT, str, bc – 24th Sunday after Trinity
- GWV 1165/28: Bei dem Herrn findet man Hilfe (1728) – ATB, org, str, bc – 24th Sunday after Trinity
- GWV 1165/30: Gelobet sei der Herr täglich (1730) – SATB, str, bc – 24th Sunday after Trinity
- GWV 1165/31: Wir haben einen Gott der da hilft (1731) – SATB, str, bc – 24th Sunday after Trinity
- GWV 1165/32: Das Ende kommt der Tod (1732) – SATB, fl (2), tra, hn (2), timp (4), str, bc – 24th Sunday after Trinity
- GWV 1165/33: Wenns kommt dass man begehret (1733) – SATB, (fl), str, bc – 24th Sunday after Trinity
- GWV 1165/35: Herr der König freuet sich in deiner Kraft (1735) – SATB, str, bc – 24th Sunday after Trinity
- GWV 1165/39: Gelobet sei der Herr täglich (1739) – SATB, ob, str, bc – 24th Sunday after Trinity
- GWV 1165/41: Ich habe in Gottes Herz und Sinn (1741) – SATB, str, bc – 24th Sunday after Trinity
- GWV 1165/42: Hilf dass ich rede stets (1742) – SATB, fg, str, bc – 24th Sunday after Trinity
- GWV 1165/43: Grosser Helfer komm und rette (1743) – SATB, str, bc – 24th Sunday after Trinity
- GWV 1165/45: Mein Kind wenn du krank wirst (1745) – SATB, str, bc – 24th Sunday after Trinity
- GWV 1165/47: Ich bin die Auferstehung und das Leben (1747) – SATB, (hn (2)), str, bc – 24th Sunday after Trinity

=== GWV 1166 ===
- GWV 1166/12a: Des Herren Tag wird kommen (1712) – SATB, ob (2), clar (2), timp (2), str, bc – 25th Sunday after Trinity
- GWV 1166/12b: Mach es aus geliebter Jesus (1712) – B, ob (2), str, bc – 25th Sunday after Trinity
- GWV 1166/20: Süsses Ende aller Schmerzen (1720) – SB, fl, str, bc – 25th Sunday after Trinity
- GWV 1166/36: Es werden sich erheben falsche Christen (1736) – SATB, str, bc – 25th Sunday after Trinity
- GWV 1166/38: Sehet zu wie ihr vorsichtig wandelt (1738) – SATB, vl (2), str, bc – 25th Sunday after Trinity
- GWV 1166/39: Es wird grosse Not auf Erden sein (1739) – SATB, fl/ob, fg, str, bc – 25th Sunday after Trinity
- GWV 1166/41: Die Übertreter werden vertilget miteinander (1741) – SATB, ob (2), str, bc – 25th Sunday after Trinity
- GWV 1166/42: Der Machtprophet der Heiland spricht (1742) – SATB, ob (2), hn (2), timp (4), str, bc – 25th Sunday after Trinity
- GWV 1166/50: Um des Landes Sünde willen (1750) – ATB, hn (2), str, bc – 25th Sunday after Trinity

=== GWV 1167 ===
- GWV 1167/09a: Ende gut und alles gut (1709) – SATB, str, bc – 26th Sunday after Trinity
- GWV 1167/09b: Mein Herz erschrick nur nicht (1709) – B, vl unis, bc – 26th Sunday after Trinity
- GWV 1167/20: Ihr Gräber öffnet eure Pforten (1720) – SSTB, str, bc – 26th Sunday after Trinity
- GWV 1167/23: Wir warten eines neuen Himmels (1723) – SATB, fg, str, bc – 26th Sunday after Trinity
- GWV 1167/25: Ihr Frommen richtet euch empor (1725) – SSATTB, fl, ob (3), fg, clar, str, bc – 26th Sunday after Trinity
- GWV 1167/28: Wacht auf ihr Toten steht auf (1728) – SATB, tra, str, bc – 26th Sunday after Trinity
- GWV 1167/31: Herr Gott des die Rache ist (1731) – SATB, str, bc – 26th Sunday after Trinity
- GWV 1167/39: Wenn des Menschen Sohn kommen wird (1739) – SATB, ob (2), fg, str, bc – 26th Sunday after Trinity
- GWV 1167/41: Es ist gewisslich an der Zeit (1741) – SATB, ob, fg, str, bc – 26th Sunday after Trinity
- GWV 1167/42: Ach Herr die Frommen warten deiner (1742) – SATB, str, bc – 26th Sunday after Trinity
- GWV 1167/47: Herr haben wir nicht in deinem Namen (1747) – SATB, fl (2), hn (2), timp (4), str, bc – 26th Sunday after Trinity

=== GWV 1168 ===
- GWV 1168/42: Auf zündet eure Lampen an (1742) – SATB, str, bc – 27th Sunday after Trinity

=== GWV 1169 ===
- GWV 1169/10: Wir wandeln im Glauben (1710) – SSATB, fl (2), ob (2), fg (2), str, bc – Candlemas (2.2.)
- GWV 1169/14: Nun hab ich meinen Gott gesehen (1714) – STB, ob (2), str, bc – Candlemas (2.2.)
- GWV 1169/19: Was gibst du denn (1719) – SSATB, str, bc – Candlemas (2.2.)
- GWV 1169/22: Ergib dich Gott allein (1722) – SATB, str, bc – Candlemas (2.2.)
- GWV 1169/25: Kommt vor Gottes Angesicht (1725) – SATB, str, bc – Candlemas (2.2.)
- GWV 1169/26: Gehorsam ist besser denn Opfer (1726) – SATB, fl (2), ob (2), fg, str, bc – Candlemas (2.2.)
- GWV 1169/28: Selig sind die reinen Herzens sind (1728) – SAT, str, bc – Candlemas (2.2.)
- GWV 1169/30: Freuen und fröhlich müssen sein (1730) – SATB, str, bc – Candlemas (2.2.)
- GWV 1169/32: Valet will ich dir geben (1732) – SATB, str, bc – Candlemas (2.2.)
- GWV 1169/33: Auf dem rechten Wege ist Leben (1733) – SATB, str, bc – Candlemas (2.2.)
- GWV 1169/36: Herr nun lässest du deinen Diener (1736) – SATB, str, bc – Candlemas (2.2.)
- GWV 1169/37: Siehe ich sende euch wie Schafe (1737) – SAT, str, bc – Candlemas (2.2.)
- GWV 1169/40: Ich hab mich Gott ergeben (1740) – SATB, chal (3)stb, hn (2), vla (2), str, bc – Candlemas (2.2.)
- GWV 1169/41: Kommt Seelen kommt nehmt eure Pflicht (1741) – SATB, str, bc – Candlemas (2.2.)
- GWV 1169/42: Entäussre dich mein Herz (1742) – SATB, str, bc – Candlemas (2.2.)
- GWV 1169/43: Der Herr ist mein Gut (1743) – SATB, str, bc – Candlemas (2.2.)
- GWV 1169/45a: Herr nun lässest du deinen Diener (1745) – SATB, str, bc – Candlemas (2.2.)
- GWV 1169/45b: Es ist genug mein matter Sinn (1745) – SATB, fl (2), hn (2), timp (4), str, bc – Candlemas (2.2.)
- GWV 1169/48: Der Herr wird dich segnen aus Zion (1748) – SATB, str, bc – Candlemas (2.2.)
- GWV 1169/49: Wir werden ihn sehen (1749) – SATB, chal (2)ab, fg, hn (2), timp (4), str, bc – Candlemas (2.2.)

=== GWV 1170 ===
- GWV 1170/19: Es ist erschienen die heilsame Gnade (1719) – SATB, str, bc – Annunciation of our Lady (25.3.)
- GWV 1170/20: Jauchzet frohlocket gefangene Seelen (1720) – SSSAB, ob, str, bc – Annunciation of our Lady (25.3.)
- GWV 1170/22: Gott lässt Gnad und Heil verkünden (1722) – SSATB, ob (2), hn (2), str, bc – Annunciation of our Lady (25.3.)
- GWV 1170/30: Siehe eine Jungfrau ist schwanger (1730) – SATB, fl am, ob am, str, bc – Annunciation of our Lady (25.3.)
- GWV 1170/33: Das Haus der Gottlosen wird vertilget (1733) – SATB, str, bc – Annunciation of our Lady (25.3.)
- GWV 1170/37: Kehre wieder Jungfrau Israel (1737) – SATB, str, bc – Annunciation of our Lady (25.3.)
- GWV 1170/40: Meinen Jesum lass ich nicht (1740) – SATB, ob (2), str, bc – Annunciation of our Lady (25.3.)
- GWV 1170/41: Gedenke Herr an die Schmach - oT: Die Schmähliche Verspottung (1741) – SATB, fl (2), ob (2), fg, str, bc – Annunciation of our Lady (25.3.)
- GWV 1170/43: Siehe du wirst schwanger werden (1743) – ATB, str, bc – Annunciation of our Lady (25.3.)
- GWV 1170/44: O Welt erkenne Gottes Liebe (1744) – SATB, str, bc – Annunciation of our Lady (25.3.)
- GWV 1170/45: Das Geheimnis des Herrn ist unter denen (1745) – SATB, str, bc – Annunciation of our Lady (25.3.)
- GWV 1170/48: Lasset fröhlich sein (1748) – SATB, str, bc – Annunciation of our Lady (25.3.)
- GWV 1170/49: Das Geheimnis des Herrn ist unter denen (1749) – SATB, fl (2), hn (2), str, bc – Annunciation of our Lady (25.3.)

=== GWV 1171 ===
- GWV 1171/11: Ich singe meinen Gott zu ehren (1711) – S, vl unis, bc – The Visitation of Mary (2.7.)
- GWV 1171/12: Wer da glaubet dass Jesus sei der Christ (1712) – SSATB, ob(2), str, bc – The Visitation of Mary (2.7.)
- GWV 1171/16: Die Liebe sei nicht falsch (1716) – SSATB, fg (2), str, bc – The Visitation of Mary (2.7.)
- GWV 1171/19: Meine Seele erhebt den Herrn (1719) – SATB, str, bc – The Visitation of Mary (2.7.)
- GWV 1171/21: Lobe den Herren den mächtigen (1721) – ST, str, bc – The Visitation of Mary (2.7.)
- GWV 1171/22: Lobt Gott mit vollen Chören (1722) – SSATB, ob (2), fg, str, bc – The Visitation of Mary (2.7.)
- GWV 1171/25: Gross sind die Werke des Herrn (1725) – SSATB, str, bc – The Visitation of Mary (2.7.)
- GWV 1171/27: Nun lob mein Seel den Herren (1727) – ATB, str, bc – The Visitation of Mary (2.7.)
- GWV 1171/31: Freuen und fröhlich müssen sein (1731) – SATB, str, bc – The Visitation of Mary (2.7.)
- GWV 1171/40: Der Herr ist gross (1740) – SATB, fl, ob (2), clar (2), timp (3), str, bc – The Visitation of Mary (2.7.)
- GWV 1171/42: O du meine Seele singe fröhlich (1742) – SATB, clar, str, bc – The Visitation of Mary (2.7.)
- GWV 1171/43: Sprechet zu Gott (1743) – SATB, str, bc – The Visitation of Mary (2.7.)
- GWV 1171/44: Jauchzet Gott alle Lande (1744) – SATB, fl, fg, hn (2), timp (4), str, bc – The Visitation of Mary (2.7.)
- GWV 1171/45: Lobet den Herrn denn unsern Gott (1745) – ATB, str, bc – The Visitation of Mary (2.7.)
- GWV 1171/46: Meine Seele erhebt den Herrn (1746) – ATB, hn (2), timp (4), str, bc – The Visitation of Mary (2.7.)
- GWV 1171/47: Gelobet sei der Herr (1747) – SATB, str, bc – The Visitation of Mary (2.7.)
- GWV 1171/48: Gelobet sei der Herr der Gott Israel (1748) – SATB, fg, hn (2), str, bc – The Visitation of Mary (2.7.)
- GWV 1171/49: Über alles ziehet an die Liebe (1749) – SATB, str, bc – The Visitation of Mary (2.7.)

=== GWV 1172 ===
- GWV 1172/22: Magnificat anima mea (1722) – SATB, ob (2), clar (2), timp (2), str, bc – Latin Works

=== GWV 1173 ===
- GWV 1173/17: Jauchzet dem Herrn alle Welt (1717) – SSATB, fg (2), clar (2), timp (2), violetta (2), str, bc – Reformation Feast
- GWV 1173/30a: Seid allezeit bereit zur Verantwortung (1730) – SATB, ob am/fl, clar (2), timp (2), str, bc – Reformation Feast
- GWV 1173/30b: Preise Jerusalem den Herrn (1730) – SATB, fl am, ob am, fg, clar (2), timp (2), str, bc – Reformation Feast

=== GWV 1174 ===
- GWV 1174/09: Hosianna sei willkommen (1709) – SATB, ob, clar (2), timp (2), str, bc – Anniversary
- GWV 1174/14: Lobet ihr Völker unsern Gott (1714) – SSSATB, ob (2), clar (2), timp (2), str, bc – Anniversary
- GWV 1174/15: Nun merke ich dass der Herr (1715) – SSATB, ob (2), hn (2), clar (2), timp (2), str, bc – Anniversary
- GWV 1174/16: Gross sind die Werke des Herrn (1716) – SSATB, ob (2), fg, clar (2), timp (2), str, bc – Anniversary
- GWV 1174/17: Herr unser Gott (1717) – SATB, ob (am), clar (2), timp (2), vla am, str, bc – Anniversary
- GWV 1174/18: Lobet ihr Knechte des Herrn (1718) – SSATB, fl (2), ob (2), clar (2), timp (2), vla am, str, bc – Anniversary
- GWV 1174/19: Jauchzet Gott alle Lande (1719) – SSATB, clar (2), timp (2), str, bc – Anniversary
- GWV 1174/20: Preise Jerusalem den Herrn (1720) – SSATB, fg (2), clar (2), timp (2), vla am, str, bc – Anniversary
- GWV 1174/21: Danket Gott, frohlockt mit Händen (1721) – SSATB, fl (2), ob (2), fg, clar (2), timp (2), str, cont – Anniversary
- GWV 1174/22: Lobsinget dem Herrn (1722) – SSTB, rec (2), ob (2), clar (2), timp (2), str, bc – Anniversary
- GWV 1174/23: Auf lobet Gottes grossen Namen (1723) – SSATB, fg?, hn (2)?, clar (2), timp (2), str, bc – Anniversary
- GWV 1174/24: Gelobet sei der Herr (1724) – SSATB, ob, hn (2), clar (2), timp (2), str, bc – Anniversary
- GWV 1174/25: Der Herr hat Grosses an uns getan (1725) – SATB, fl (2), ob (3), fg, hn (2), clar (2), timp (2), str, bc – Anniversary
- GWV 1174/26: Frohlockt lasst frohe Lieder hören (1726) – SATB, fl (2), ob (2), fg, clar (2), timp (2), str, bc – Anniversary
- GWV 1174/27: Danket mit Jauchzen dem Herrscher der Höhen (1727) – SAT, fl (2), ob (3), fg, clar (2), timp (2), str, bc – Anniversary
- GWV 1174/28: Kommet herzu lasset uns dem Herrn frohlocken (1728) – SATB, fl, ob (2), clar (2), timp (2), str, bc – Anniversary
- GWV 1174/29: Kommt frohlocket mit Danken (1729) – SATB, fl, fg, clar (2), timp (2), vl, str, bc – Anniversary
- GWV 1174/30: Singet fröhlich Gotte der unsere Stärke ist (1730) – SATB, fl am, ob am, clar (2), timp (2), str, bc – Anniversary
- GWV 1174/31: Der Herr ist ihre Stärke (1731) – SATB, fl (2), (ob), clar (2), timp (2), vl (2), str, bc – Anniversary
- GWV 1174/32: Ich Weisheit wohne bei der Witze (1732) – SATBBB, fl (2), hn (2), clar (2), timp (4), str, bc – Anniversary
- GWV 1174/33: Gott wir warten deiner Güte (1733) – SATB, (fl), hn (2), clar (2), timp (3), str, bc – Anniversary
- GWV 1174/34: Gelobet sei Gott der Herr (1734) – SSATB, fl (2), chal (2)tb, hn (2), clar (2), timp (3), str, bc – Anniversary
- GWV 1174/35: Bei Gott ist mein Heil (1735) – SSATB, chal (2)tb, clar (2), timp (2), str, bc – Anniversary
- GWV 1174/36: Die auf den Herrn harren (1736) – SATB, fl (2), chal (2)tb, fg, clar (2), timp (4), str, bc – Anniversary
- GWV 1174/37: Danket dem Herrn aller Herren (1737) – SSATB, chal (2)a/tb, fg, clar (2), timp (2), str, bc – Anniversary
- GWV 1174/38: Kommet herzu lasset uns dem Herrn frohlocken (1738) – SATB, chal (3)atb, fg, clar (2), timp (4), vl (2), vla am, str, bc – Anniversary
- GWV 1174/40: Herr wir warten deiner Güte (1740) – SATB, ob, chal (3)stb, hn (2), clar (2), timp (3), vl, str, bc – Anniversary
- GWV 1174/41: Der Herr Zebaoth der Gott Israel (1741) – SATB, ob (2), chal (3)stb, fg, clar (2), timp (2), str, bc – Anniversary
- GWV 1174/42: Lobet ihr Völker unsern Gott (1742) – SATB, rec (2), ob (2), hn (2), clar (2), timp (4), vl (2), str, bc – Anniversary
- GWV 1174/43: Herr du bist Gott (1743) – SATB, chal (2)tb, hn (2), timp (4), str, bc – Anniversary
- GWV 1174/44: Hebet eure Hände auf (1744) – SATB, chal (2)ab, hn (2), timp (4), str, bc – Anniversary
- GWV 1174/45: Danket dem Herrn prediget seinen Namen (1745) – ATB, ob (2), fg, hn (2), clar (2), timp (4), str, bc – Anniversary
- GWV 1174/46: Bringet her dem Herrn Ehre (1746) – SATB, chal (2)tb, hn (2), clar (2), timp (4), str, bc – Anniversary
- GWV 1174/47: Dies ist der Tag den der Herr gemacht hat (1747) – ATB, (ob), hn (2), clar (2), timp (4), str, bc – Anniversary
- GWV 1174/48: Freuet euch des Herrn (1748) – SATB, hn (2), clar (2), timp (4), str, bc – Anniversary
- GWV 1174/49: Wohlauf und lasset uns hinaufgehen (1749) – SATB, hn (2), clar (2), timp (4), str, bc – Anniversary
- GWV 1174/50: Preise Jerusalem den Herrn (1750) – SATB, fl (2), ob (2), hn (2), clar (2), timp (4), str, bc – Anniversary
- GWV 1174/51: Lasset uns dem Herrn singen (1751) – SATB, fl (2), hn (2), timp (4), str, bc – Anniversary
- GWV 1174/52: Der Gerechte wird grünen (1752) – SATB, fl (2), hn (2), clar (2), timp (4), str, bc – Anniversary
- GWV 1174/53: Der Herr erhöre dich in der Not (1753) – SATB, fl (2), fg (2), hn (2), clar (2), timp (4), str, bc – Anniversary
- GWV 1174/54: Lasset unsere Bitte vor (1754) – SATB, fl (2), klar (2), fg (2), hn (2), timp (4), str, bc – Anniversary

=== GWV 1175 ===
- GWV 1175/16a: Der Herr hats gegeben (1716) – SSATB, ob (2), str, bc – Funeral Music
- GWV 1175/16b: Das hochbetrübte Fürstenhaus (1716) – SSATB, ob (2), str, bc – Funeral Music
- GWV 1175/26a: Unsers Herzens Freude hat ein Ende (1726) – SSATB, rec, str, bc – Funeral Music
- GWV 1175/26b: Ach meines Jammers Herzeleid (1726) – SSATB, fl, ob (2) str, bc – Funeral Music
- GWV 1175/26c: Ich habe Lust abzuscheiden (1726) – SATB, fl (2), ob (2), vla am, str, bc – Funeral Music
- GWV 1175/31a: Herr wenn ich nur dich habe (1731) – SATB, fl, clar (2), timp (2), str, bc – Funeral Music
- GWV 1175/31b: Der Tod seiner Heiligen ist wertgehalten (1731) – SATB, str, bc – Funeral Music
- GWV 1175/31c: Selig sind die Toten (1731) – SATB, clar (2), timp (2), str, bc – Funeral Music
- GWV 1175/32: Führe meine Seele aus dem Kerker (1732) – SATB, fl (2), str, bc – Funeral Music
- GWV 1175/39a: Lasset uns unser Herz (1739) – SATB, (fl/ob), chal (3)atb, clar (2), timp (2), vl (2), str, bc – Funeral Music
- GWV 1175/39b: Wir wissen dass unser irdisches Haus (1739) – SATB, (fl/ob), chal (3)atb, fg, clar (2), timp (2), vla am (2), str, bc – Funeral Music
- GWV 1175/39c: Gott deine Gerechtigkeit ist hoch (1739) – SATB, ob (3), fg, hn (2), clar, timp (2), str, bc – Funeral Music
- GWV 1175/46: Der Tod ist zu unsern Fenstern hereingefallen (1746) – SATB, str, bc – Funeral Music

=== GWV 1176 ===
- GWV 1176/38: Der Herr erhöre dich in der Not (1738) – SATBB, chal (2)ab, fg, hn (2), clar (2), timp (4), str, bc – Incidental Music

== See also ==
- List of symphonies by Christoph Graupner
- List of harpsichord pieces by Christoph Graupner
- List of orchestral suites by Christoph Graupner
- List of concertos by Christoph Graupner
- List of chamber pieces by Christoph Graupner
