= Accademia =

Accademia (Italian for "academy") often refers to:

- The Galleria dell'Accademia, an art museum in Florence
- The Gallerie dell'Accademia, an art museum in Venice

Accademia may also refer to:

== Academies of art ==
- The Accademia Carrara di Belle Arti di Bergamo, an art school and museum in Bergamo
- The Accademia di Architettura di Mendrisio, a Swiss school of architecture
- The Accademia di Belle Arti di Bari, an art school in Bari
- The Accademia di Belle Arti di Bologna, also known as the Accademia Clementina
- The Accademia di Belle Arti di Carrara, an art school in Carrara
- The Accademia di Belle Arti di Firenze, an art school in Florence
- The Accademia di Belle Arti di Milano "Brera" or Brera Academy, an art school in Milan
- The Accademia di Belle Arti di Napoli, an art school in Naples
- The Accademia di Belle Arti di Roma, an art school in Rome
- The Accademia di Belle Arti di Torino "Albertina" or Accademia Albertina, an art school in Turin
- The Accademia di Belle Arti di Venezia, an art school in Venice
- The Accademia di Belle Arti Gian Bettino Cignaroli di Verona, or Academy of Fine Arts, Verona, also known as Accademia Cignaroli
- The Nuova Accademia di Belle Arti, a private art school in Milan

== Learned societies ==
- The Accademia Angelica-Constantiniana di lettere, arti e scienze or Angelica-Constantiniana Academy of Arts and Sciences, founded in Rome in 1949
- The Accademia degli Arcadi, a literary academy founded in Rome in 1690, also known as
  - Accademia dell'Arcadia,
  - Pontificia Accademia degli Arcadi
- The Accademia degli Incamminati, founded in about 1580 in Bologna, also known as
  - Accademia dei Desiderosi or
  - Accademia dei Carracci
- The Accademia Cosentina, founded in Cosenza in 1511, also known at various times as
  - Accademia Parassiana
  - Accademia Telesiana
  - Accademia dei Costanti
  - Accademia dei Negligenti and
  - Accademia dei Pescatori Cratilidi
- The Accademia degli Incogniti, founded in Venice in 1630
- The Accademia degli Infiammati, a philosophical and literary academy founded in 1540 in Padua
- The Accademia degli Intronati, founded in Siena between 1525 and 1527
- The Accademia degli Svogliati in 17th-century Florence
- The Accademia dei Georgofili, a learned society established in Florence in 1753
- The Accademia dei Lincei, a scientific academy founded in 1603 in Rome
- The Accademia dei Risvegliati, founded in Pistoia in the 17th century
- The Accademia dei Secreti or Academia Secretorum Naturae, founded by Giovambattista Della Porta in the 16th century
- The Accademia del Cimento, a scientific society founded in Florence in 1657
- The Accademia della Crusca, a learned society founded in Florence in 1583
- The Accademia delle Arti del Disegno, a society of artists in Florence
- The Accademia delle Scienze dell'Istituto di Bologna or Academy of Sciences of the Institute of Bologna, an academic society in Bologna, founded in 1714
- The Accademia di San Luca, an association of artists founded in 1577 in Rome
- The Accademia Fiorentina, a philosophical and literary academy founded in Florence in 1540 as the
  - Accademia degli Umidi
- The Accademia Galileiana, a learned society in Padova, variously known during its history as
  - Accademia dei Ricovrati
  - Accademia di Arte Agraria
  - Accademia di Scienze Lettere e Arti
  - Accademia Patavina di Scienze, Lettere ed Arti
- The Accademia Musicale Chigiana, a musical institution in Siena
- The Accademia Nazionale delle Scienze, the Italian national academy of science, founded in Verona in 1782, also known as
  - L’Accademia Nazionale delle Scienze detta dei XL or
  - Accademia dei XL
- The Accademia Nazionale di Santa Cecilia, a musical institution in Rome
- The Accademia Neoplatonica or Platonic Academy (Florence), a 15th-century discussion group in Florence centred round Marsilio Ficino
- The Accademia Pontaniana, a scientific academy founded in Naples in the 15th Century
- Any Pontifical academy of the Roman Catholic Church or other Roman Academies, including
  - The Accademia di Raffaele Sanzio
  - The Accademia Filarmonica
  - The Pontificia Accademia Alfonsiana
  - The Pontificia Accademia di Conferenze Storico-Giuridiche
  - The Pontificia Accademia "Cultorum Martyrum", or Pontifical Academy of Martyrs, founded 1879
  - The Pontificia Accademia dei Nobili Ecclesiastici
  - The Pontificia Accademia della Immacolata Concezione
  - The Pontificia Accademia delle Scienze, or Pontifical Academy of Sciences, founded in 1603
  - The Pontificia Accademia delle Scienze Sociali, or Pontifical Academy of Social Sciences, founded 1994
  - The Pontificia Accademia di Latinità, or Pontifical Academy for Latin, established in 2012
  - The Pontificia Accademia di Religione Cattolica
  - The Pontificia Accademia Ecclesiastica
  - The Pontificia Accademia Liturgica
  - The Pontificia Accademia Mariana Internazionale, or Pontifical Academy of Mary, established in 1946
  - The Pontificia Accademia per la Vita, or Pontifical Academy for Life, founded in 1994
  - The Pontificia Accademia Romana di Archeologia or Pontifical Academy of Archaeology, founded in 1810
  - The Pontificia Accademia Romana di San Tommaso di Aquino, or Pontifical Academy of St. Thomas Aquinas, founded in 1879
  - The Pontificia Accademia Teologica, or Pontifical Academy of Theology, founded in 1718
  - The Pontificia Accademia Tiberina
  - The Pontificia Insigne Accademia di Belle Arti e Letteratura dei Virtuosi al Pantheon, or Pontifical Academy of Fine Arts and Letters of the Virtuosi al Pantheon, established in 1542
  - The Regia Accademia Medica
- The Reale Accademia d'Italia or Royal Academy of Italy, an academy of the Fascist period, active 1926–43

== Other academies ==
- The Accademia Aeronautica, the Italian Air Force academy
- The Accademia di Agricoltura di Torino, founded in Turin in 1785
- The Accademia Filarmonica di Bologna, a music school in Bologna
- The Accademia Filarmonica di Verona, a music school in Verona
- The Accademia Italiana, a private university
- The Accademia Italiana Skopje, a fashion school in Skopje
- The Accademia Italiana Thailand, a fashion school in Bangkok
- The Accademia Navale di Livorno or Italian Naval Academy, the Italian naval training academy in Livorno
- The Accademia Nazionale d'Arte Drammatica Silvio D'Amico, founded in Rome in 1936
- The Accademia Reale di Torino, a defunct military academy
- The Accademia Vivarium Novum in Rome

== Others ==
- Accademia Apulia, a non-profit organisation founded in April 2008 in London
- The Accademia bridge or Ponte dell'Accademia
- Accademia Daniel, an Israeli music ensemble
- The Accademia della Farnesina, a centre for sport and political education in fascist Italy, also known as
  - Accademia fascista della Farnesina
  - Accademia fascista maschile di educazione fisica
- The Accademia Filarmonica Romana, an orchestra based in Rome
- The Accademia Italiana di Lingua, a professional association of schools of Italian as a foreign language
- The Accademia Normanna or Norman Academy, a Florida association for the promotion of the arts, letters and humanities world-wide
- Piccola Accademia di Montisi, a musical association in Montisi, Tuscany

== See also ==
- List of learned societies in Italy
