= List of learned societies in Italy =

Past and present learned societies in the territory that is now Italy include:

Name	English name if used	Location	Founded	Extinguished	Notes
Accademia Agraria di Pesaro	Agricultural Academy of Pesaro	Pesaro	1828		
Accademia Aldina		Venice	1494	1515	
Accademia Altomareana		Naples	c. 1540	1562	
Accademia Amasea		Rome	mid-16th century		
Accademia Basiliana		Rome	1635		
Accademia Bencia		Ferrara	15th century		
Accademia Bocchiana		Bologna	1546	1562	
Accademia Cortesiana		Rome	Late 15th century		
Accademia Cosentina		Cosenza			
Accademia d'eloquenza in San Luca		Venice	end 17th century		
Accademia d'eloquenza in San Moisé		Venice	end 17th century		
Accademia de' Medici Conghietturanti		Modena	1751	1766	
Accademia de' Pacifici		Mantua	1625		
Accademia degli Abbagliati		Venice	c. 1650		
Accademia degli Abbarbicati		Messina	1636	1678	
Accademia degli Abbassati		Rome			
Accademia degli Abbandonati		Bologna	c. 1670	1677	
Accademia degli Accesi		Palermo	1568	1581	
Accademia degli Accesi, Bologna		Bologna	1686	1699	
Accademia degli Accesi, Mantua		Mantua	1655		
Accademia degli Accesi, Rome		Rome			
Accademia degli Accesi, Siena		Siena	1558	1603	
Accademia degli Accesi		Venice		1565	Compagnia della calza
Accademia degli Accinti		Città di Castello			
Accademia degli Accordati		Siena			
Accademia degli Accordati		Genoa			
Accademia degli Acerbi		Rome	c. 1619		
Accademia degli Acuti		Venice	1620		
Accademia degli Addolorati		Palermo	1617		
Accademia degli Addormentati		Naples	1662		
Accademia degli Addormentati, Aversa		Aversa (Caserta)	1680		
Accademia degli Addormentati, Genoa		Genoa	1563; 1587		
Accademia degli Adornati		Naples	c. 1695		
Accademia degli Adorni		Venice	c. 1580	1620	
Accademia degli Affidati		Pavia			
Accademia degli Affidati		Bologna	c. 1548		
Accademia degli Affidati, Guastalla		Guastalla (Mantua)	c. 1580	c. 1630	
Accademia degli Affilati		Siena	after 1580		
Accademia degli Afflati		Ferrara	c. 1550		
Accademia degli Affumati		Bologna	c. 1530		
Accademia degli Affumicati		Modica (Ragusa)	1558	1720	
Accademia degli Affumicati		Mesagne (Brindisi)	1671	c. 1751	
Accademia degli Agghiacciati		Palermo			
Accademia degli Aggravati		Rome			
Accademia degli Agiati		Rimini			
Accademia degli Agitati		Naples	1665		
Accademia degli Alati		Palermo			
Accademia degli Allettati		Venice			
Accademia degli Alterati		Florence			
Accademia degli Altieri		Rome	17th century		
Accademia degli Ambiziosi		Rome	17th century		
Accademia degli Anelanti		Padua	c. 1659		
Accademia degli Anfibii		Rome			
Accademia degli Anfistili		Rome	c. 1650		
Accademia degli Angustiati di Murano		Venice	1659	1664	
Accademia degli Animati		Rome	17th century		
Accademia degli Animosi d'Oreto		Palermo	1642		
Accademia degli Animosi, Bologna		Bologna	c. 1552	c. 1592	
Accademia degli Animosi, Cremona		Cremona			
Accademia degli Animosi, Padova		Padua	1573	1576	
Accademia degli Animosi, Roma		Rome	17th century		
Accademia degli Animosi, Venezia		Venice	1691	1711 c. 1716	
Accademia degli Annuvolati		Genoa	c. 1630		
Accademia degli Apatisti		Florence	1631	1783	
Accademia degli Apologhi		Venice	c. 1650		
Accademia degli Appartati		Siena	17th century		
Accademia degli Applicati		Ferrara	1680		
Accademia degli Arcincauti		Naples			
Accademia degli Ardenti		Bologna	1555	after 1750	
Accademia degli Ardenti		Naples	1546	1547	
Accademia degli Ardenti		Rome	17th century		
Accademia degli Ardenti		Venice	c. 1598		
Accademia degli Ardenti		Ferrara	c. 1575		
Accademia degli Arditi		Rome	17th century		
Accademia degli Argonauti, Bologna		Bologna	late 17th century	mid-18th century	
Accademia degli Argonauti, Casale Monferrato		Casale Monferrato	c. 1540		
Accademia degli Argonauti, Messina		Messina	1644		
Accademia degli Argonauti, Roma		Rome			
Accademia degli Argonauti, Venezia		Venice	1684	1718	
Accademia degli Arrischiati		Rome	17th century		
Accademia degli Arrischiati		Siena			
Accademia degli Ascendenti		Ferrara	c. 1562		
Accademia degli Assetati		Rome	1659		
Accademia degli Assicurati		Rome	c. 1630		
Accademia degli Assicurati		Venice	c. 1606		
Accademia degli Assidui		Bologna	1567		
Accademia degli Assorditi		Urbino			
Accademia degli Audaci		Rome	17th century		
Accademia degli Avveduti		Padua	c. 1600	c. 1615	
Accademia degli Avviliti		Naples	c. 1660s		
Accademia degli Avviliti		Rome			
Accademia degli Avviluppati		Rome	17th century		
Accademia degli Avviluppati		Siena	mid-16th century	1615	
Accademia degli Avvivati		Bologna	1657		
Accademia degli Ebbri		Syracuse, Sicily	1629	1753	
Accademia degli Eccitati		Bergamo			
Accademia degli Ecclissati		Naples			
Accademia degli Eletti		Ferrara	1570		
Accademia degli Elevati		Catania			
Accademia degli Elevati, Ferrara		Ferrara	1540	1541	
Accademia degli Elevati, Padova		Padua	1557	1559	
Accademia degli Elevati, Reggio Emilia		Reggio Emilia			
Accademia degli Equivoci		Rome			
Accademia degli Erculei		Naples	1625		
Accademia degli Erranti		Naples	1626	1700	
Accademia degli Erranti, Ceneda		Ceneda			
Accademia degli Erranti, Roma		Rome	mid-17th century		
Accademia degli Eterei		Padua	1563–4	1568–9	
Accademia degli Etnei		Catania	1675		
Accademia degli Eubolei		Naples	1546	1548	
Accademia degli Euteleti		San Miniato	1822		
Accademia degli Illuminati		Rome	c. 1598		
Accademia degli Illuminati		Ferrara	1660	after 1669	
Accademia degli Illustrati		Casale Monferrato	1561	c. 1595	
Accademia degli Immaturi		Venice	1618		
Accademia degli Immobili		Venice	c. 1618		
Accademia degli Immobili		Alessandria			
Accademia degli Impazienti		Bologna	1689 and 1694		
Accademia degli Imperfetti		Rome	c. 1612		
Accademia degli Imperfetti		Mantua	c. 1680	1689	
Accademia degli Imperfetti, Venezia		Venice	1648		
Accademia degli Imperturbabili		Venice	c. 1658		
Accademia degli Impetuosi		Rome	17th century		
Accademia degli Impressi		Rome	17th century		
Accademia degli Inabili, Bologna		Bologna	1673		
Accademia degli Inanimiti		Venice			
Accademia degli Inariditi		Rome			
Accademia degli Inariditi		Genoa	c. 1650		
Accademia degli Inaspettati		Rome	1596		
Accademia degli Incamminati		Bologna	1582	c. 1630	
Accademia degli Incauti		Rome	17th century		
Accademia degli Incauti, Napoli		Naples	1617	c. 1640	
Accademia degli Incitati		Rome	c. 1581	1586; 1615	
Accademia degli Incogniti (Naples)		Naples	c. 1540	c. 1548	
Accademia degli Incogniti (Catania)		Catania	1672		
Accademia degli Incogniti		Venice	1626–27	1661	
Accademia degli Incolti		Naples	c. 1640		
Accademia degli Incolti		Rome	1658	early 18th century	
Accademia degli Incruscabili		Venice	1568		
Accademia degli Inculti		Rome	1699		
Accademia degli Incuriositi		Naples	1698		
Accademia degli Indefessi, Bologna		Bologna	c. 1634		
Accademia degli Indefessi, Ferrara		Ferrara	1576		
Accademia degli Indefessi, Roma		Rome	17th century		
Accademia degli Indifferenti		Bologna		c. 1590	
Accademia degli Indipendenti		Rome	17th century		
Accademia degli Indipendenti		Bologna	17th century		
Accademia degli Indisposti		Rome	c. 1670		
Accademia degli Indivisi		Bologna	c. 1690	1711	
Accademia degli Indomiti		Bologna	1640	1646	
Accademia degli Industriosi		Venice	17th century		
Accademia degli Industriosi		Genoa	1783		
Accademia degli Ineguali		Rome	17th century		
Accademia degli Infarinati		Rome	c. 1630		
Accademia degli Infaticabili		Venice	1656	after 1704	
Accademia degli Infecondi		Rome	c. 1600	c. 1760	
Accademia degli Infiammati, Bologna		Bologna	1650	c. 1653	
Accademia degli Infiammati, Padova		Padua	1540	c. 1545	
Accademia degli Infievoliti		Rome	17th century		
Accademia degli Infocati		Siena			
Accademia degli Informi		Catania	1672		
Accademia degli Informi, Bologna		Bologna	c. 1631	1654	
Accademia degli Informi, Ravenna		Ravenna			
Accademia degli Informi, Roma		Rome			
Accademia degli Informi, Venezia		Venice	1627		
Accademia degli Infuriati		Naples			
Accademia degli Infuriati		Rome			
Accademia degli Infuriati, Napoli		Naples	1617	1693	
Accademia degli Ingegnosi		Rome	17th century		
Accademia degli Ingegnosi		Ferrara	1620	1626	
Accademia degli Innominati		Siena			
Accademia degli Innominati, Parma		Parma			
Accademia degli Inoltrati		Venice			
Accademia degli Inquieti (Siena)		Siena	17th century		
Accademia degli Inquieti, Roma		Rome	before 1688		
Accademia degli Inquieti		Bologna	1690	1714	
Accademia degli Insensati		Perugia			
Accademia degli Instabili, Bologna		Bologna	1590		
Accademia degli Instancabili		Venice	c. 1618		
Accademia degli Instaurabili		Venice	end of 16th century		
Accademia degli Intenti		Pavia	1593		
Accademia degli Intrecciati		Rome	1641	c. 1692	
Accademia degli Intrecciati		Siena	before 1666		
Accademia degli Intrepidi		Ferrara	1601	after 1787	
Accademia degli Intricati		Rome	c. 1609		
Accademia degli Intrigati		Venice	before 1606		
Accademia degli Intronati		Siena	1525	1568; 1603	
Accademia degli Invaghiti		Mantua	1562	1752	
Accademia degli Invaghiti		Rome			
Accademia degli Invaghiti		Genoa	1588		
Accademia degli Investiganti		Naples	1650	1737	
Accademia degli Invigoriti		Bologna			
Accademia degli Invigoriti		Padua	1623	1629	
Accademia degli Invitti		Mantua	c. 1600	1648	
Accademia degli Obbligati		Ferrara	1720		
Accademia degli Occulti		Rome	17th century		
Accademia degli Occulti		Brescia			
Accademia degli Occulti, Murano		Venice	1605	1608	
Accademia degli Occupati		Rome	c. 1640		
Accademia degli Olimpici		Ferrara	c. 1562	after 1627	
Accademia degli Ombrosi		Rome	before 1673		
Accademia degli Operosi		Bologna	1620		
Accademia degli Operosi		Ferrara	c. 1575		
Accademia degli Ordinati		Rome	1608		
Accademia degli Ordinati		Venice	c. 1618		
Accademia degli Orditi		Padua	c. 1600	c. 1615	
Accademia degli Oscuri		Naples	1679	1720	
Accademia degli Oscuri		Siena	17th century		
Accademia degli Oscuri, seconda		Siena	1692		
Accademia degli Ostinati		Rome	17th century		
Accademia degli Ottenebrati		Bologna	1680		
Accademia degli Ottusi		Bologna	17th century		
Accademia degli Ottusi		Spoleto	1477		
Accademia degli Oziosi		Naples	1611	1700s	
Accademia degli Oziosi, Bologna		Bologna	1563	c. 1567	
Accademia degli Oziosi, Ragusa, Dalmatia		Ragusa, Dalmatia	1637	after 1718	
Accademia degli Oziosi, Roma		Rome	17th century		
Accademia degli Sborrati		Siena	c. 1530		
Accademia degli Sbragazai		Venice	1510		Compagnia della calza
Accademia degli Schiumati		Siena	16th century	17th century	
Accademia degli Scomposti		Fano	1641		
Accademia degli Sdegnati		Rome	1541	c. 1545	
Accademia degli Sforzati		Rome	17th century		
Accademia degli Smarriti		Siena	c. 1530	c. 1568	
Accademia degli Speculanti		Rome	17th century		
Accademia degli Spensierati		Padua	before 1673		
Accademia degli Spensierati		Ferrara	c. 1598	after 1650	
Accademia degli Spensierati, Messina		Messina			
Accademia degli Spensierati, Siena		Siena	late 17th century		
Accademia degli Speranti		Padua	late 17th century		
Accademia degli Speziali medicinalisti		Bologna	1647		
Accademia degli Spinosi		Bologna	17th century		
Accademia degli Sregolati		Rome			
Accademia degli Stabili		Padua	c. 1580	c. 1610	
Accademia degli Sterili		Rome	before 1648	1683	
Accademia degli Sterili		Candia	c. 1632		
Accademia degli Storditi		Bologna	1565	c. 1570	
Accademia degli Stravaganti		Rome			
Accademia degli Stravaganti		Candia	1572		
Accademia degli Strepitosi		Naples	1667		
Accademia degli Svogliati		Naples	c. 1560	1593	
Accademia degli Svogliati		Siena	16th century		
Accademia degli Sviati		Siena			
Accademia degli Sviluppati		Venice	1618		
Accademia degli Svogliati		Florence	5 November 1620	c. 1648	
Accademia degli Umidi		Florence	1540	1783	
Accademia degli Umili		Rome	c. 1568	1578	
Accademia degli Umili		Ferrara	1571	after 1607	
Accademia degli Umoristi		Rome	c. 1600	c. 1670	
Accademia degli Unanimi		Bologna	1670	1673	
Accademia degli Uniformi		Rome	17th century		
Prima Accademia degli Unisoni		Venice	1637		
Accademia degli Uniti		Naples	c. 1690s		
Accademia degli Uniti Seconda, Venezia		Venice	before 1697		
Accademia degli Uniti, Padova		Padua			
Accademia degli Uniti, Roma		Rome			
Accademia degli Uniti, Siena		Siena	1594		
Accademia degli Uniti, Venezia		Venice	1551		
Accademia degli uomini d'arme		Siena	1568		
Accademia degli Uranici		Venice	c. 1587	after 1599	
Accademia degli Zitoclei		Padua	1609	1619	
Accademia dei Baldanzosi		Rome			
Accademia dei Bell'Ingegni		Palermo	c. 1620		
Accademia dei Bersagliati		Rome	first half of the 17th century		
Accademia dei Cacciatori		Venice	1596		
Accademia dei Canonisti		Palermo	1687		
Accademia dei Capassoni		Siena			
Accademia dei Cassinesi		Catania	1688		
Accademia dei Catenati		Siena			
Accademia dei Cavalieri dell'Iride		Rome			
Accademia dei Certi		Rome	early 17th century		
Accademia dei Chiari		Catania	c. 1621		
Accademia dei Cigni		Ferrara	c. 1677		
Accademia dei Concili		Rome	1671	1740	
Accademia dei Concordi, Ferrara		Ferrara	1579		
Accademia dei Concordi, Napoli		Naples	1674		
Accademia dei Concordi, Ragusa, Dalmatia		Ragusa, Dalmatia	mid-16th century		
Accademia dei Concordi di Rovigo		Rovigo	1608		
Accademia dei Confusi, Bologna		Bologna	1570		
Accademia dei Confusi, Ferrara		Ferrara	1623		
Accademia dei Congregati		Rome	c. 1667		
Accademia dei Coraggiosi		Bari			
Accademia dei Costanti		Padua	c. 1556		
Accademia dei Cupi		Rome	early 17th century		
Accademia dei Curiosi		Rome			
Accademia dei Deboli		Rome	1696		
Accademia dei Deformati		Ferrara	17th century		
Accademia dei Delfici		Venice	c. 1647	c. 1690	
Accademia dei Delicati		Rome			
Accademia dei Depressi		Rome	mid-17th century		
Accademia dei Desiosi, Bologna		Bologna	c. 1650		
Accademia dei Desiosi, Genova		Genoa	1694		
Accademia dei Desiosi, Siena		Siena	16th century		
Accademia dei Desiosi, Venezia		Venice	1629		
Accademia dei Dieci Cantoni		Ferrara	15th century		
Accademia dei Difendenti		Rome	17th century		
Accademia dei Difesi		Venice	c. 1654	c. 1660	
Accademia dei Dipendenti		Rome	17th century		
Accademia dei Diramati		Rome	mid-17th century		
Accademia dei Disarmati		Rome			
Accademia dei Discordanti		Naples	1666	1668	
Accademia dei Discordanti, Venezia		Venice	1618	after 1656	
Accademia dei Discordati		Ferrara	1647		
Accademia dei Disinvolti		Venice	c. 1648	c. 1678	
Accademia dei Dispersi		Genoa	1591		
Accademia dei Disprezzati		Rome			
Accademia dei Disuniti, Napoli		Naples	c. 1590		
Accademia dei Disuniti, Padova		Padua	1640		
Accademia dei Disuniti, Pisa		Pisa			
Accademia dei Disuniti, Roma		Rome	before 1688		
Accademia dei Divisi		Rome			
Accademia dei Dodonei		Venice	1673		
Accademia dei Dogmi		Rome	1694		
Accademia dei Dotti		Rome	mid-17th century		
Accademia dei Dubbiosi		Naples	1646		
Accademia dei Dubbiosi, Roma		Rome			
Accademia dei Dubbiosi, Venezia		Venice	1551	1553	
Accademia dei Fanfalini		Siena	early 17th century		
Accademia dei Fantastici		Rome	1625	1688	
Accademia dei Fecondi		Padua	c. 1600		
Accademia dei Felici		Mantua	1587	c. 1595	
Accademia dei Fenici		Milan			
Accademia dei Ferraiuoli		Siena	1568	before 1603	
Accademia dei Filadelfici		Venice	1690		
Accademia dei Filaleti		Venice	1661–63		
Accademia dei Filareti		Ferrara	1554		
Accademia dei Fileleuteri		Venice	1620		
Accademia dei Fileni		Ferrara	1631		
Accademia dei Filergiti		Forlì			
Accademia dei Filodafni		Venice			
Accademia dei Filomati		Siena	1577–80	1654	
Accademia dei Filomeli		Siena	c. 1570		
Accademia dei Filoponi		Faenza			
Accademia dei Filoponi		Venice	1626		
Accademia dei Fioriti		Rome	mid-17th century		
Accademia dei Fisiocritici		Siena	17 March 1691		
Accademia dei Floridi		Mantua			
Accademia dei Fluttuanti		Rome			
Accademia dei Freddi		Naples	1667		
Accademia dei Galeotti		Genoa	c. 1550		
Accademia dei Gelati di Bologna		Bologna	1588	1800	
Accademia dei Gelosi		Rome			
Accademia dei Gelosi, Venezia		Venice	16th century		
Accademia dei Generosi		Venice			
Accademia dei Generosi, Murano		Venice	1596		
Accademia dei Georgofili		Florence	1753		
Accademia dei Gesuiti		Venice	c. 1657	c. 1693	
Accademia dei Gravi		Rome	first half of the 17th century		
Accademia dei Laboriosi		Venice	1620	1628	
Accademia dei Leggieri		Naples			
Accademia dei Lenti		Rome	17th century		
Accademia dei Lincei		Rome	1603	1630	
Accademia dei Malinconici		Rome	c. 1614		
Accademia dei Mancanti		Rome	17th century		
Accademia dei Mansuefatti		Rome	Late 17th century		
Accademia dei Marittimi		Venice			
Accademia dei Mercuriali		Ferrara	1574		
Accademia dei Minacciosi		Rome	17th century		
Accademia dei Moderati		Rome	17th century		
Accademia dei Molesti		Rome	17th century		
Accademia dei Molesti, Seconda		Rome	17th century		
Accademia dei Morescanti		Ferrara	c. 1669		
Accademia dei Mutoli		Genoa	1611		
Accademia dei Nascosti		Rome			
Accademia dei Naufraganti		Naples	1672		
Accademia dei Negletti		Rome	c. 1630		
Accademia dei Novelli		Bologna	c. 1620		
Accademia dei Pacifici		Padua			
Accademia dei Pacifici, Venezia		Venice			
Accademia dei Palladi		Catania	1674		
Accademia dei Paragonisti		Venice	mid-17th century		
Accademia dei Parteni		Bologna			
Accademia dei Partici		Ferrara	c. 1569		
Accademia dei Pavoni		Venice			
Accademia dei Pellegrini		Venice			
Accademia dei Pellegrini, Roma		Rome	before 1693		
Accademia dei Penosi		Ferrara			
Accademia dei Peregrini		Paris			
Accademia dei Peripatetici		Venice	1630		
Accademia dei Perpetui		Venice	1491		Compagnia della calza
Accademia dei Perseveranti		Bologna	late 16th century		
Accademia dei Piazzesi		Piazza Armerina (Enna)	c. 1651		
Accademia dei Pigna		Venice			Compagnia della calza
Accademia dei Pitii		Bologna	1628		
Accademia dei Politici		Bologna	c. 1580		
Accademia dei Potenti		Padua	c. 1570		
Accademia dei Potenti		Venice	before 1487		Compagnia della calza
Accademia dei Precipitosi		Rome	17th century		
Accademia dei Principali		Venice			Compagnia della calza
Accademia dei Prodighi		Rome	17th century		
Accademia dei Provveduti		Venice	after 1630		
Accademia dei Prudenti		Venice	before 1487		Compagnia della calza
Accademia dei Puavoli		Venice	1471		Compagnia della calza
Accademia dei Puliti		Siena	16th century		
Accademia dei Pungenti		Rome	17th century		
Accademia dei Puri		Rome			
Accademia dei Racchiusi		Siena	17th century		
Accademia dei Raccolti		Siena	16th century		
Accademia dei Raccolti		Venice	1673		
Accademia dei Raffrontati		Siena	c. 1588	1594	
Accademia dei Raffrontati		Venice	before 1690		
Accademia dei Ravvivati		Siena	before 1685	1685	
Accademia dei Reali Juniores		Venice	1529		Compagnia della calza
Accademia dei Reali seniores		Venice	1487	1562	Compagnia della calza
Accademia dei Recisi		Rome			
Accademia dei Regolati		Rome	17th century		
Accademia dei Renati		Venice	c. 1602		
Accademia dei Rettori		Bologna	mid-17th century		
Accademia dei Riaccesi		Bologna	c. 1560 c. 1619	before 1686	
Accademia dei Riaccesi, Palermo		Palermo	1622		
Accademia dei Ricovrati		Padua	1599	1779	merged with the Accademia di Arte Agraria into the Accademia di scienze lettere e arti, nowadays known as Accademia Galileiana
Accademia dei Ricreduti		Ferrara	c. 1614		
Accademia dei Rigidi		Rome	17th century		
Accademia dei Rinascenti		Padua	1573	1575	
Accademia dei Rinati		Venice	end of 16th century		
Accademia dei Ringiovaniti		Bologna	c. 1640		
Accademia dei Rinnovandi		Rome	17th century		
Accademia dei Rinnovati		Rome	17th century		
Accademia dei Rinnovati		Ferrara	c. 1579		
Accademia dei Ripidi		Rome	17th century		
Accademia dei Rischiarati		Rome	17th century		
Accademia dei Rischiarati, Siena		Siena	16th century		
Accademia dei Risoluti		Siena	1580	1603	
Accademia dei Risoluti, Bologna		Bologna	c. 1631	c. 1714	
Accademia dei Risvegliati (Naples)		Naples			
Accademia dei Risvegliati		Pistoia			
Accademia dei Riuniti		Venice	c. 1590	after 1623	
Accademia dei Rozzi		Naples	c. 1670	1703	
Accademia dei Ruvidi		Rome	17th century		
Accademia dei Sabei		Venice	16th century		
Accademia dei Salutiferi		Bologna	c. 1643		
Accademia dei Santi Giovanni e Paolo		Venice	1610		
Accademia dei Secreti		Siena	c. 1580		
Accademia dei Secreti		Rome			
Accademia dei Segreti	Academia Secretorum Naturae	Naples	1560	1580	
Accademia dei Selvaggi		Bologna	c. 1606	c. 1629	
Accademia dei Sempiterni		Venice		1541	Compagnia della calza
Accademia dei Separati alla Giudecca		Venice	1675		
Accademia dei Sepolti		Volterra	1597		
Accademia dei Serafici, Padova		Padua			
Accademia dei Sereni		Ferrara	1580		
Accademia dei Sicuri		Naples	c. 1630		
Accademia dei Sileni		Naples	1612		
Accademia dei Silenti		Venice	1651		
Accademia dei Simposiaci		Rome	1662		
Accademia dei Sireni		Naples	c. 1545	1548	
Accademia dei Sitibondi		Padua	16th century		
Accademia dei Sitibondi		Bologna	c. 1554		
Accademia dei Sizienti, Siena		Siena	Late 16th century		
Accademia dei Solenni		Venice	c. 1455		Compagnia della calza
Accademia dei Solfansini		Siena	early 16th century		
Accademia dei Solitari		Naples	c. 1630		
Accademia dei Sollevati		Venice			
Accademia dei Sollevati, Roma		Rome	17th century		
Accademia dei Sollevati, Bologna		Bologna	c. 1672		
Accademia dei Sonnacchiosi		Bologna	before 1543		
Accademia dei Soprani		Venice			Compagnia della calza
Accademia dei Tardi		Rome	17th century		
Accademia dei Tassisti		Venice	1673		
Accademia dei Tenaci		Rome	17th century		
Accademia dei Tenebrosi		Ferrara	1624		
Accademia dei Tergemini		Ferrara	1567	after 1589	
Accademia dei Timidi		Mantua	1648	c. 1767	
Accademia dei Torbidi		Bologna	c. 1628		
Accademia dei Tranquilli		Rome	17th century		
Accademia dei Travagliati, Ferrara		Ferrara	1567		
Accademia dei Travagliati, Siena		Siena	1550–55	1600	
Accademia dei Traviati		Rome			
Accademia dei Trionfanti		Venice	before 1520		
Accademia dei Truci		Rome	17th century		
Accademia dei Vaghi		Rome	17th century		
Accademia dei Valorosi		Venice		1524	Compagnia della calza
Accademia dei Vani		Rome	17th century		
Accademia dei Vari		Naples	1650		
Accademia dei Vari, Roma		Rome	c. 1690		
Accademia dei Velati		Bologna	1615		
Accademia dei Velati		Ferrara	1690		
Accademia dei Venturati		Venice	1628		
Accademia dei Verecondi		Rome	17th century		
Accademia dei Vespertini		Bologna	1624		
Accademia dei Vigilanti		Rome			
Accademia dei Vigilanti, Murano		Venice	1602	after 1675	
Accademia dei Vignaiuoli		Rome	1527–30		
Accademia dei Violenti		Rome	17th century		
Accademia dei Virtuosi		Rome	1621	1623	
Accademia dei Virtuosi		Venice	early 16th century		Compagnia della calza
Accademia dei Vivi		Candia	1562		
Accademia dei Vogliosi		Rome	c. 1592	c. 1699	
Accademia dei Volanti		Naples	1640		
Accademia dei Volubili		Rome	17th century		
Accademia dei Zardinieri		Venice	16th century		Compagnia della calza
Accademia dei Ziati		Venice	early 16th century		Compagnia della calza
Accademia del Cimento, Napoli		Naples	1680		
Accademia del Cimento		Florence	1657	1667	
Accademia del Disegno		Florence			
Accademia del Liceo		Rome	early 16th century		
Accademia del piacere onesto		Bologna	c. 1602		
Accademia del Platano		Rome	c. 1693		
Accademia del Simbolo		Rome			
Accademia del Viridario		Bologna	1511		
Accademia Delfica		Rome			
Accademia Delia		Padua	1608	1801	
Accademia dell'Arcadia		Rome	1690		
Accademia dell'Arcidiacono		Bologna	1687	1689	
Accademia dell'Oracolo		Rome	after 1650		
Accademia della Civetta		Trapani	1686	1760	
Accademia della Crusca		Florence	1583		
Accademia della Fucina		Messina	1639	1678	
Accademia della Galleria di Minerva		Venice	1696	1713	
Accademia della Morte		Ferrara	1686		
Accademia della Notte		Venice			
Accademia della Notte, Bologna		Bologna	late 1500		
Accademia della Stella		Messina	1595	1647	
Accademia della Traccia		Bologna	1665	1678–79	
Accademia della Verità		Siena	16th century		
Accademia della Vigilanza		Venice	16th century		
Accademia della Virtù		Rome	c. 1532	c. 1545	
Accademia delle Assicurate		Siena	1654	1710–20	
Accademia delle Notti Vaticane		Rome	1562	1565	
Accademia delle Scienze		Naples	1732		
Accademia delle Scienze dell'Istituto di Bologna	Academy of Sciences of the Institute of Bologna	Bologna	1714		
Accademia delle Scienze di Ferrara	Academy of Sciences of Ferrara	Ferrara	1823		
Accademia delle Scienze di Torino	Academy of Sciences of Turin		1757		
Accademia delle Scienze, e delle Arti degli Ardenti di Viterbo		Viterbo	1480		
Accademia dello Spirito Santo		Ferrara	1597		
Accademia di Agricoltura di Torino	Academy of Agriculture of Turin	Turin	1785		
Accademia di Agricoltura, Scienze e Lettere di Verona	Academy of Agriculture, Science and Letters of Verona		1768		
Accademia di Arte Agraria	Academy of the Agrarian Arts	Padua	1769	1779	
Accademia di Lettere Armi e Musica		Ferrara	1570–80		
Accademia di Medicina di Torino	Academy of Medicine of Turin		1819		
Accademia di San Luca		Rome	1593		
Accademia di San Pietro		Mantua	c. 1498	c. 1520s	
Accademia di San Salvatore		Bologna	c. 1640		
Accademia di San Vito		Ferrara	c. 1554		
Accademia di Santa Cecilia		Rome	1584		
Accademia di Santo Stefano		Venice	mid-17th century		
Accademia di Scienze, Lettere e Arti di Palermo	Academy of Sciences, Letters and Arts of Palermo	Palermo	1718		
Accademia di Storia ecclesiastica		Genoa	1742		
Accademia di Tullia d'Aragona		Rome	c. 1550		
Accademia Durazziana		Genoa	after 1750		
Accademia Ecclesiastica		Genoa	1783		
Accademia Eroica		Ferrara		1617	
Accademia Estense		Ferrara	1530		
Accademia Etrusca di Cortona	Etruscan Academy of Cortona	Cortona	1726		
Accademia Eustachiana		Rome	c. 1547		
Accademia Ferrarese		Ferrara	1570	after 1587	
Accademia Filarmonica (1666)		Bologna	1615	present	
Accademia Filarmonica, Verona		Verona			
Accademia Fisico-matematica		Rome	1677	1698	
Accademia Galileiana di Scienze, Lettere ed Arti in Padova		Padua	1779		
Accademia Geografico-storico-fisica		Venice	1680	1714	
Accademia Georgica		Treia	1430		
Accademia Gessiana		Rome	1630		
Accademia Gibertiana		Rome	mid-16th century		
Accademia Gioenia di Scienze Naturali in Catania		Catania	1824		
Accademia I Desiosi		Rome	1626		
Accademia Ievoliana		Naples	1559		
Accademia Italiana di Medicina Manuale	Italian Academy of Osteopathy		1997		
Accademia Italiana di Scienze Forestali	Italian Academy of Forest Sciences		1951		
Accademia Jatro-Fisica di Palermo	Accademia dei Iatrofisici di Palermo	Palermo	1621		
Accademia Lancisiana di Roma		Rome	1715		
Accademia Ligure di Scienze e Lettere	Ligurian Academy of Sciences and Letters	Genoa	1890		
Accademia Lucchese di Scienze, Lettere ed Arti		Lucca	1584		
Accademia Maiellana		Naples	c. 1690	1709	
Accademia Martiraniana		Naples	c. 1530	1555	
Accademia Mazzuchelliana		Brescia	1738	1768	
Accademia Medica		Rome	1681	c. 1687	
Accademia Medinaceli		Naples	1698		
Accademia Minervale		Venice	16th century	17th century	
Accademia Morsiniana		Venice	before 1618		
Accademia Nazionale dei Lincei		Rome	1603		
Accademia Nazionale delle Scienze detta dei XL			1782		
Accademia Nazionale di Agricoltura	National Academy of Agriculture		1807		
Accademia Nazionale di Medicina	National Academy of Medicine		1991		
Accademia Nazionale di Santa Cecilia			1585		
Accademia Nazionale di Scienze, Lettere e Arti Modena		Modena	1683		
Accademia Nazionale Virgiliana di Scienze, Lettere ed Arti		Mantua	1768		
Accademia Olimpica		Vicenza	1555		
Accademia Pantectica		Venice			
Accademia Parrasiana		Cosenza	1507		
Accademia Partenia		Siena	c. 1560		
Accademia Partenia		Naples	1594		
Accademia Partenia		Ferrara	1588		
Accademia Partenia minore, Milano		Milan			
Accademia Partenia, Roma		Rome	c. 1594	c. 1639	
Accademia Parutiana		Venice	1561	1598	
Accademia Petrarca di Lettere, Arti e Scienze di Arezzo	Petrarchian Academy of Letters, Arts and Sciences of Arezzo	Arezzo	1810		
Accademia Pia		Ferrara	c. 1643		
Accademia Platonica		Venice	c. 1550		
Accademia Platonica di Firenze		Florence	1462	1522	
Accademia Pomponiana		Rome	1460	1527	
Accademia Pontaniana		Naples	1442 or 1443		
Accademia Reale di Cristina di Svezia		Rome	1674	1689	
Accademia Rinaldiana		Naples	c. 1550	c. 1580	
Accademia Roveretana degli Agiati di Scienze, Lettere e Arti		Rovereto	1750		
Accademia Sarottiana		Venice	1682		
Accademia Sauliana		Genoa	1520	1522	
Accademia Scritturale		Venice	1662		
Accademia Sebezia Colonia degli Arcadi		Naples			
Accademia Serafica		Venice	1593		
Accademia Severoliana		Rome	after 1690		
Accademia Teologica		Rome	c. 1695		
Accademia Teologica Scolastica		Naples	c. 1650		
Accademia Toscana di Scienze e Lettere "La Colombaria"		Florence	1735		
Accademia Udinese di Scienze, Lettere e Arti		Udine	1606		
Accademia Valdarnese del Poggio		Valdarno	1804		
Accademia Veneziana		Venice	1557	1561	
Accademia Veniera		Venice	c. 1548		
Associazione Agraria Subalpina		Turin	1842	1866	
Associazione Elettrotecnica ed Elettronica Italiana	Italian Electrotechnical and Electronics Association		1897		
Associazione Geofisica Italiana	Italian Geophysical Association		1951		
Associazione Geotecnica Italiana	Italian Geotechnical Association		1947		
Associazione Informatici Professionisti	Italian Computer Society		1991		
Associazione Italiana Biblioteche	Italian Library Association		1930		
Associazione Italiana del Vuoto	Italian Vacuum Association		1963		
Associazione Italiana di Agrometeorologia	Italian Agrometeorological Association		1997		
Associazione Italiana di Ingegneria Chimica	Italian Association of Chemical Engineering		1958		
Associazione Italiana di Metallurgia	Italian Association of Metallurgy		1946		
Associazione Italiana di Ricerca Operativa	Operations Research Society of Italy		1961		
Associazione Italiana di Robotica e Automazione	Italian Robotics and Automation Association		1975		
Associazione Italiana di Scienze della Voce	Italian Association for Speech Sciences		2003		
Associazione Italiana Pedologi	Association of Italian Pedologists		1992		
Associazione Italiana per la Qualità	Associazione Italiana Cultura Qualità		1955		
Associazione Italiana per l'Informatica ed il Calcolo Automatico	Italian Association for Informatics and Computation		1961		
Associazione Italiana per l'Intelligenza Artificiale	Italian Association for Artificial Intelligence		1988		
Associazione Italiana Prove Non Distruttive Monitoraggio Diagnostica	Italian Society for Nondestructive Testing, Monitoring and Diagnostics		1979		
Associazione Microbiologi Clinici Italiani	Italian Association for Clinical Microbiology		1970		
Associazione Nazionale Archivistica Italiana	National Association of Italian Archivists		1948		
Associazione Nazionale Italiana Per L'Automazione	Italian National Association for Automation		1956		
Associazione per l'Insegnamento della Fisica	Association for the Teaching of Physics		1962		
Associazione Tecnica dell'Automobile	Association of Automotive Engineering		1948		
Ateneo di Brescia: Accademia di Scienze, Lettere ed Arti	Atheneum of Brescia: Academy of Sciences, Letters and Arts	Brescia	1802		
Ateneo di Scienze Lettere ed Arti Bergamo		Bergamo	1810		
Ateneo Veneto di Scienze, Lettere ed Arti		Venice	1812		
Compagnia dei Fausti		Venice	1503	after 1524	
Congrega de' Rozzi		Siena	1531	1535; 1544	
Congrega dei Taciturni		Rome	c. 1600		
Coro anatomico		Bologna	1650	c. 1656	
Federazione Nazionale degli Ordini dei Medici Chirurghi e degli Odontoiatri	National Federation for the Orders of Doctors and Dentists		1946		
Federazione Nazionale dell'Industria Chimica	National Federation for the Chemical Industry		1920		
Federfarma			1969		
I Desti		Bologna	16th century		
Istituto Italiano degli Attuari	Italian Institute of Actuaries		1929		
Istituto Lombardo Accademia di Scienze e Lettere	Lombardy Institute, Academy of Sciences and Letters	Lombardy	1797		
Istituto Nazionale Italiano	National Italian Institute	Bologna, Milan	1802	1838	
Istituto Nazionale Ligure	National Ligurian Institute	Genoa	1786	1815	
Istituto Veneto di Scienze, Lettere ed Arti	Venetian Institute of Sciences, Letters and Arts	Venice	1838		
Nuova Accademia dei Nobili senesi		Siena	before 1691		
Prima Accademia dei Concili		Rome	1682	1690	
Prima Accademia dei Costanti		Ferrara	c. 1575		
Reale Accademia delle Scienze e Belle-Lettere di Napoli	Royal Academy of Sciences and Humanities of Naples	Naples	1780	1788	
Reale Accademia Medico-Chirurgica di Napoli	Royal Medico-Surgical Academy of Napoli	Naples	1740	1934	
Reale Istituto d'Incoraggiamento d'Agricoltura, Arti e Manifatture per la Sicilia	Royal Institute for the Encouragement of Agriculture, Arts and Manufactures for Sicily	Sicily	1831	1863	
Reale Istituto d'Incoraggiamento di Napoli	Royal Institute for Encouragement of Naples	Naples	1806	1937	
Reale Società Agraria ed Economica di Cagliari	Società Agraria ed Economica di Cagliari	Cagliari	1804	1862	
Regale Accademia Ercolanese	Reale Accademia Ercolanese	Naples	1755	1808	
Seconda Accademia dei Confusi, Bologna		Bologna	1610–20	1640	
Seconda Accademia dei Costanti		Ferrara	c. 1650		
Seconda Accademia Veneziana		Venice	1594	1608	
Società Agraria di Lombardia	Agricultural Society of Lombardy	Lombardy	1861		
Società Agraria Spoletina	Agrarian Society of Spoleto	Spoleto	1818	1846	
Società Botanica Fiorentina	Florentine Botanical Society	Florence	1716	1783	
Società Dante Alighieri	Dante Alighieri Society		1889		
Società dei Naturalisti in Napoli	Society of Naturalists in Naples	Naples	1814		
Società di Cultura e di Incoraggiamento di Padova	Society of Culture and Encouragement of Padova	Padua	1830	1937	
Società di Letture e Conversazioni Scientifiche di Genova	Society of Letters and Scientific Conversations of Genova	Genoa	1866		
Società Economica di Chiavari	Economic Society of Chiavari	Chiavari	1791		
Società Entomologica Italiana	Italian Entomological Society		1869		
Società Filarmonica di Trento	Philharmonic Society of Trento	Trento	1795		
Società Filosofica Italiana			1902		
Società Geografica Italiana	Italian Geographical Society		1867		
Società Indologica "Luigi Pio Tessitori"	Indological Society named for Luigi Pio Tessitori		1993		
Società Italiana degli Storici dell'Economia	Society of Italian Economic Historians		1984		
Società Italiana delle Storiche	Italian Society of Women Historians		1989		
Società Italiana di Anatomia Patologica e Citologia Diagnostica	Italian Society of Pathological Anatomy and Diagnostic Cytology		1995		
Società Italiana di Biochimica Clinica e Biologia Molecolare Clinica	Italian Society of Clinical Biochemistry and Clinical Molecular Biology		1968		
Società Italiana di Biochimica e Biologia Molecolare	Italian Society of Biochemistry and Molecular Biology		1951		
Società Italiana di Fisica	Italian Physical Society		1897		
Società Italiana di Genetica Umana	Italian Society of Human Genetics		1997		
Società Italiana di Igiene, Medicina Preventiva e Sanità Pubblica	Italian Society for Hygiene, Preventive Medicine and Public Health		1921		
Società Italiana di Medicina Interna	Italian Society of Internal Medicine		1887		
Società Italiana di Neurologia	Italian Society of Neurology		1907		
Società Italiana di Ortodonzia	Italian Society of Orthodontics		1968		
Società Italiana di Pediatria	Italian Society of Pediatrics		1898		
Società Italiana di Psicologia	Italian Society of Psychology		1910		
Società Italiana di Radiologia Medica	Italian Society of Radiology		1913		
Società Italiana di Relatività Generale e Fisica della Gravitazione	Italian Society of General Relativity and Physics of Gravitation		1990		
Società Italiana di Scienza Politica	Italian Society of Political Science		1973		
Società Italiana di Scienze Naturali	Italian Society of Natural Sciences	Milan	1856		
Società Italiana di Virologia	Italian Society of Virology		2001		
Società Italiana per la Simulazione con il Calcolatore	Associazione Italiana per la Simulazione con il Calcolatore		1984		
Società Italiana Reti Neuroniche	Italian Neural Networks Society		1989		
Società Letteraria Ravennate	Literary Society of Ravenna	Ravenna	1752	1771	
Società Medica Chirurgica di Bologna	Medical and Surgical Society of Bologna	Bologna	1802		
Società Medica Italiana di Psicoterapia e Ipnosi	Italian Medical Society for Psychotherapy and Hypnosis		1985		
Società Nazionale di Scienze, Lettere e Arti in Napoli	National Society of Sciences, Letters and Arts in Napoli	Naples	1808		
Società Numismatica Italiana	Italian Numismatic Society		1892		
Società Oftalmologica Italiana	Italian Ophthalmological Society		1879		
Società Orticola Italiana	Italian Horticultural Society		1953		
Società Pattriotica di Milano	Società Patriotica di Milano	Milan	1776	1797	
Unione Accademica Nazionale	National Academic Union (Italy)		1923		
Unione Matematica Italiana	Italian Mathematical Union		1922		

== See also ==
- List of academies of fine art in Italy
- List of learned societies
