= Nikola Eftimov =

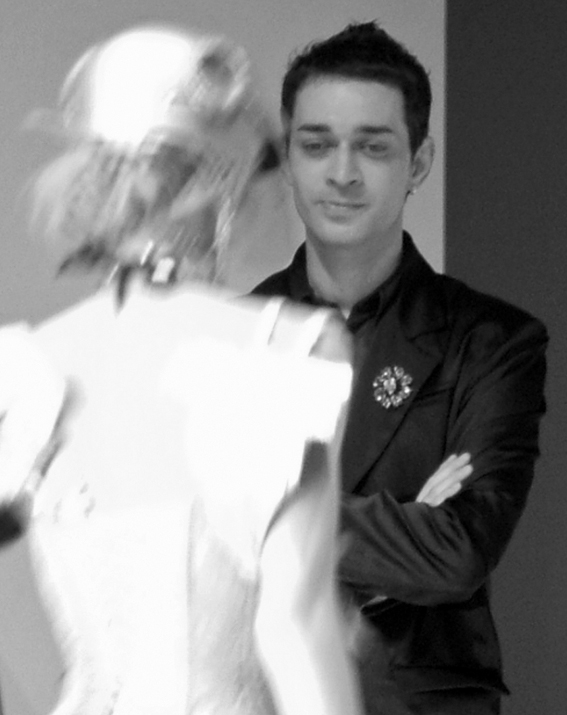
- Nikola Eftimov, capture taken at the fashion show in Florence (2005)
- Born: 6 October 1968 (age 57); Skopje, Yugoslavia (now North Macedonia)
- Education: Faculty of Fine Arts in Skopje, Accademia Italiana in Florence, Italy
- Known for: Fashion design and visual art

Photo from the cycle “Kitchen couture”, corsets executed in 2000, Nikola Eftimov

Lezzet (the male underwear collection, 2003), photo Ilhan Osmani

Nikola Eftimov (Macedonian: Никола Ефтимов, born 6 October 1968 in Skopje, Yugoslavia, now in North Macedonia) is a Macedonian fashion designer and visual artist.

He graduated at the Faculty of Fine Arts in Skopje (Graphic Art and Fashion Design, 1993) and completed the master studies at Accademia Italiana in Florence, Italy (Fashion as Art, “The Eccentric male costume in the last three centuries”, 1998). After the three years working experience (2006–09) as an academic manager and professor at Accademia Italiana Skopje, currently he is occupied with the researches for his PhD thesis. In October 2009 he started to teach at the Faculty for Art and Design, European University Skopje. He has a wide range of professional interests (fashion as art, fashion as communication, theory, and history of costume and fashion, experimental fashion techniques, men's wear, theory of collection, haute couture, photography) and his work is focused on research of gender, cultural and social issues of the costume and fashion. From 1994 to 1997 he participates in group exhibitions of graphic art and drawing (1997, Macedonian Drawing ’96 – Award from the National and University Library Skopje).

The period between 1992 and 2010 is marked with work in the fields of fashion and costume design. In 2005, he won “The Coca-Cola light fashion design award” that enabled him presentation of the winning design in Florence and the position of professor at Accademia Italiana Bangkok (2005–2006).

Sani (Macedonian fashion journalist) wearing Eftimov's outfits. Photos by Ivan Blazev, 2003

Photos from the project “Entangled Fragments: ABC of Curatorial Black”, Nikola Eftimov, 2007
