= Das Leiden Jesu von seinen Freunden =

Church cantata by Christoph Graupner

- Passion cantata by Christoph Graupner
- Catalogue: GWV 1122/41
- Occasion: Oculi
- Text: Johann Conrad Lichtenberg
- Bible text: Matthew 26:50, 56; Luke 22:48
- Chorale: "Wenn meine Sünd' mich kränken"
- Language: German
- Composed: 1741
- Scoring: soprano alto tenor bass; strings; continuo

Christoph Graupner composed the Passion cantata Das Leiden Jesu von seinen Freunden (The suffering of Jesus from his friends), GWV 1122/41, in Darmstadt in 1741, for Oculi Sunday. It is based on a libretto by Johann Conrad Lichtenberg who wrote a cycle of reflective cantatas for the seven Sundays in Lent of that year, with this cantata focused on Jesus being betrayed and denied by his friends. The cantata is structured in seven movements, a Biblical dictum, a sequence of alternating recitatives and arias, and a closing chorale fantasia. It is scored for four voices, strings and continuo.

== History ==
Graupner composed the cantata while he was court musician in Darmstadt where he especially supplied church music for decades. Das Leiden Jesu von seinen Freunden is a late cantata among the many he composed for Oculi, the third Sunday in Lent.

The libretto was written by Johann Conrad Lichtenberg (1689-1751), who would become pastor in Darmstadt from 1745 until his death. He was married to a sister of Graupner's wife. Graupner based 1,190 of his around 1,400 cantatas on his texts. Lichtenberg wrote three cycles of Passion cantatas for Darmstadt, the first in 1718, based on seven penitential psalms traditionally associated with the Sundays of Lent, the last in 1743 dealing with sayings of Jesus on the cross, and the second in 1741. He called it Betrachtungen über die Hauptumstände des großen Versöhnungsleidens unseres Erlösers (Reflections on the Circumstances Surrounding the Propitiatory Passion of Our Saviour). Graupner visited Lichtenberg often, and they possibly collaborated on the cantatas.

== Music ==
Graupner structured the composition in seven movements, beginning with a dictum based on the Gospels of Matthew and Luke, then alternating recitatives and arias, and a closing chorale fantasia: He scored it for four vocal parts (soprano, alto, tenor and bass), two violins, viola and continuo.

1. Dictum (bass, tenor): "Freund, warum bist du kommen?"
2. Recitative (soprano): "Ach Jesu, wie so wehe muss die in deiner Seele sein "
3. Aria: (soprano): "Aller Jammer, alle Plagen"
4. Recitative (bass): "Ihr, die ihr euch in Christo nennet"
5. Aria (bass): "Der Herr ist treu, wenn seine Freunde fallen"
6. Recitative (alto): "Ihr Freunde Jesu wacht"
7. Chorale (SATB): Herr, lass dein bitter Leiden mich reizen für und für"

The opening dictum is based on Biblical verses. The bass as the voice of Christ quotes from Matthew 26:50, asking Judas: "Friend, why are you here?", and continuing from Luke 22:48: "Judas! Do you betray the Son of Man with a kiss?" The tenor as the Evangelist continues from Matthew 26:56: "Then all the disciples left Him and fled". The dictum and all recitatives are composed as accompagnato. The soprano reflects: "Ah, my Jesus, how sorrowful you must be in your soul." The following da capo aria is focused on "Every woe and every plague becomes light with the comfort of friends." with uplifting music in the outer section, but in a contrasting middle section that Jesus is missing such comfort. The bass reflects in recitative and aria the fall of the friends of Jesus. An accompagnato for the alto, a call to remain loyal to Jesus, is followed by a setting of the fifth stanza of the 1646 hymn "Wenn meine Sünd' mich kränken" by Justus Gesenius as a chorale fantasia with the cantus firmus in the bass, and complex counterpoint rich in dissonances for the text beginning: "Lord, let Thy woes, Thy patience, my heart with strength inspire to vanquish all temptations and spurn all base desire."

== Performance and recording ==
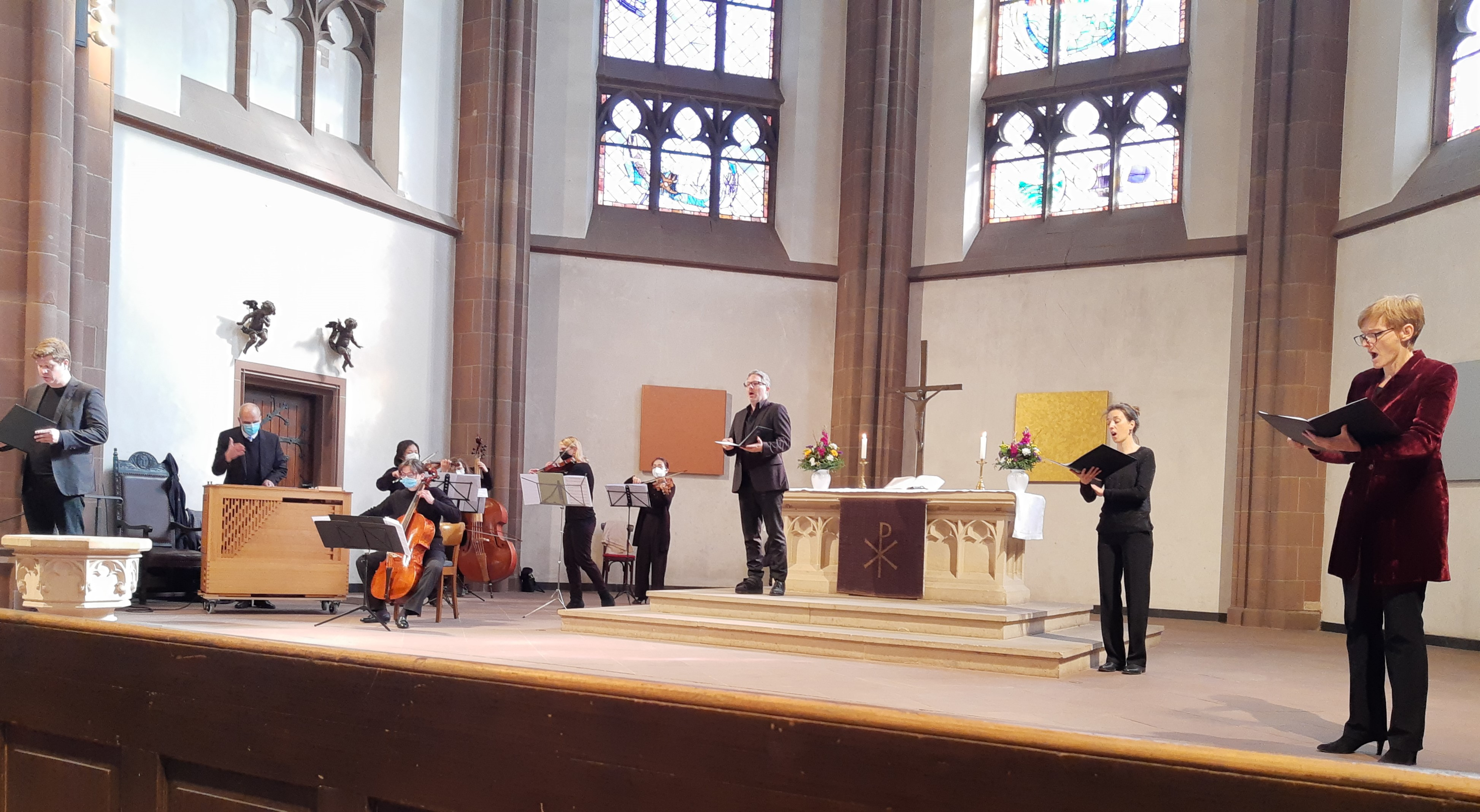
Final movement of the cantata performed in a cantata service at the Dreikönigskirche, Frankfurt

The cantata was recorded in 2017 as part of an album of three Passion cantatas by Graupner from 1741, performed by the ensemble Ex Tempore and the Barockorchester Mannheimer Hofkapelle conducted by Florian Heye, with Annelies Van Grambeeren and Dominik Wörner as the singers of the arias. The cantata was performed in a series of cantata services at the Dreikönigskirche, Frankfurt on 28 March 2021 during the COVID-19 epidemic, with soloists and the Telemann Ensemble Frankfurt.
