= Ich will den Kreuzweg gerne gehen =

Church cantata by Georg Philipp Telemann

- Church cantata by Georg Philipp Telemann
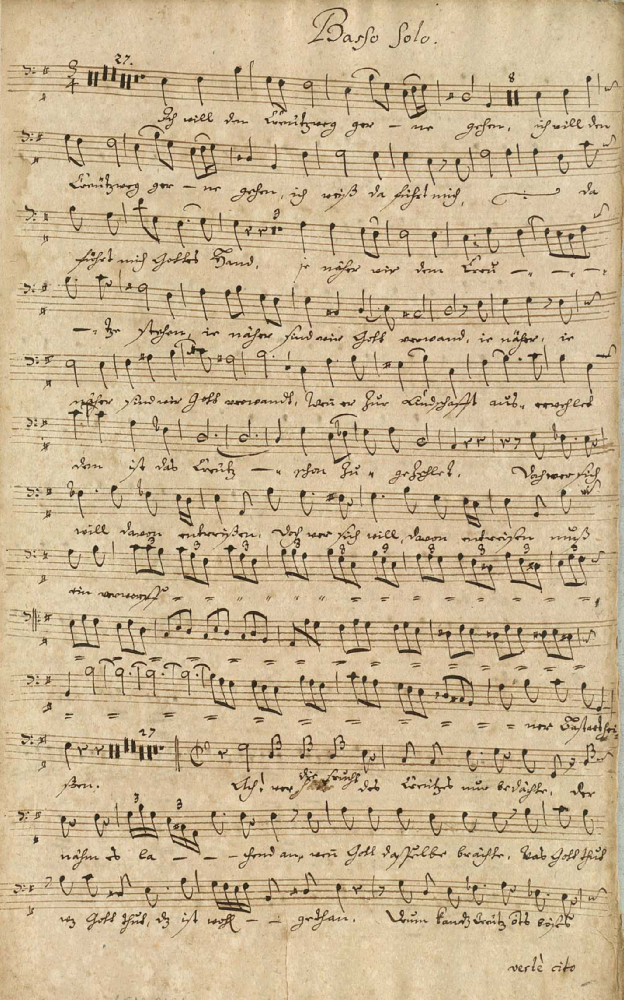
- First page of bass part (DK-Kk mu 6510.0136 manuscript)
- Catalogue: TWV 1:884
- Occasion: 21st Sunday after Trinity
- Written: c. 1700
- Text: by Erdmann Neumeister
- Language: German
- Composed: 1710s
- Scoring: bass; violin; continuo

Georg Philipp Telemann composed the church cantata Ich will den Kreuzweg gerne gehen (I will gladly walk the Cross way), TWV 1:884, for bass, violin and continuo for the 21st Sunday after Trinity. He used a text by Erdmann Neumeister.

== History ==
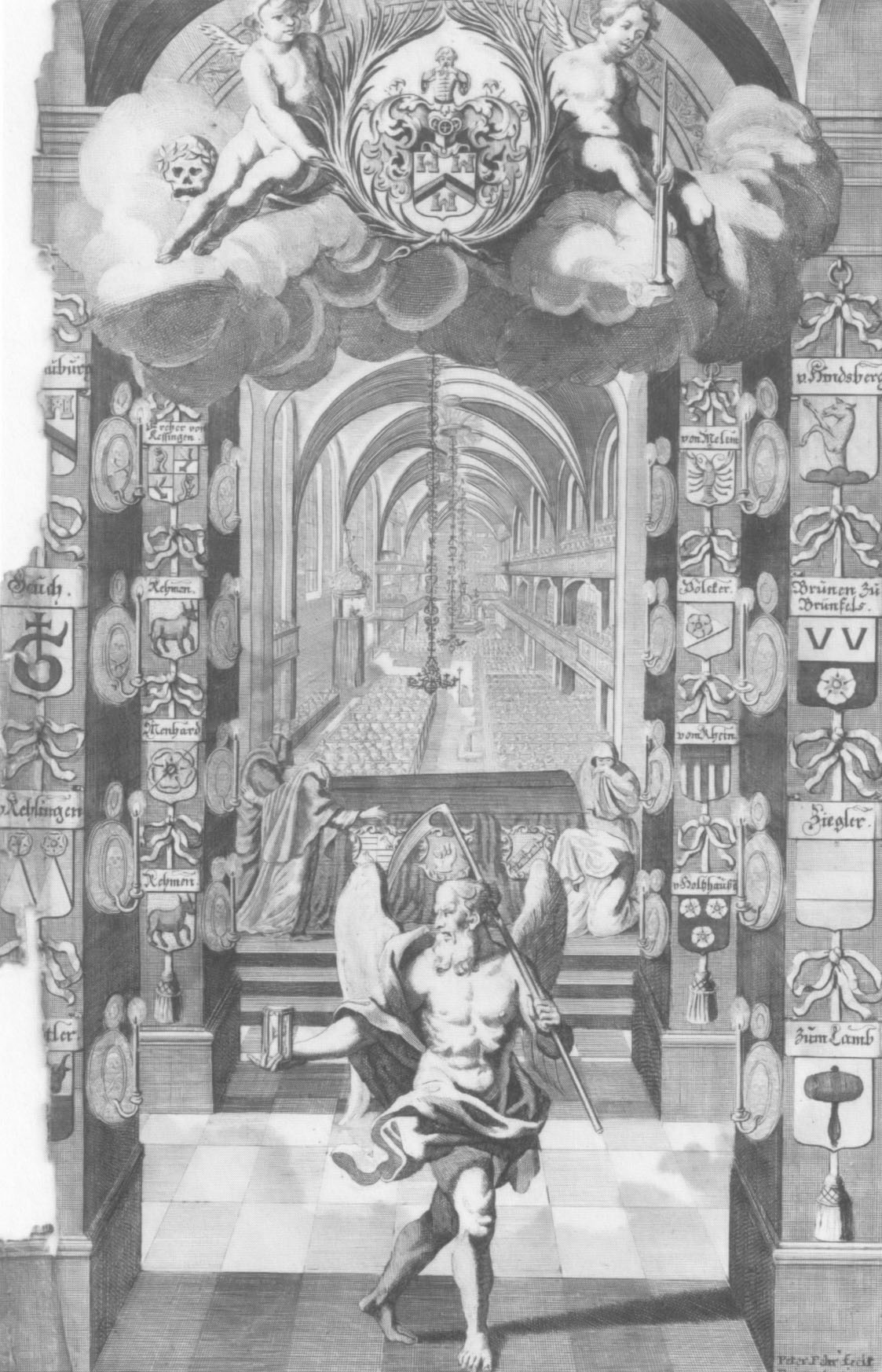
1718 depiction of the interior of the Barfüßerkirche

Telemann composed the cantata while he was church musician in Frankfurt at the Barfüßerkirche and Katharinenkirche, beginning in 1712. When he applied for the post he described his voice as not tenor, not bass. Many of his church cantatas are written for a high bass, possibly written for himself, including Ich will den Kreuzweg gerne gehen.

Erdmann Neumeister wrote the text of the cantata as part of his first year-cycle of cantata librettos, which was, around 1700, first set by Johann Philipp Krieger, court Kapellmeister in Weissenfels. Although the entire cycle was set by several composers, only a few isolated cantatas with a text from the cycle survive. All of Krieger's settings are lost, and from Telemann, who likely also set the entire cycle, only seven cantatas on its librettos are extant. Other than that, the only surviving settings of the cycle's librettos are a few by Johann Kuhnau, and a single one by Emanuel Kegel.

The cantata text of Ich will den Kreuzweg gerne gehen, as used by Telemann, was printed in 1705. Neumeister's text for this cantata possibly inspired the anonymous poetry for Bach's Ich will den Kreuzstab gerne tragen, BWV 56. Neumeister's libretto and its setting by Telemann are intended for the 21st Sunday after Trinity. Telemann's setting was published in a critical edition by Deutscher Verlag für Musik, Leipzig, now distributed by Breitkopf, edited by Walter Heinz Bernstein and Wolf Hobohm.

== Music ==
Telemann structured the composition in five movements, alternating arias and recitatives:

1. Aria "Ich will den Keuzweg gerne gehen"
2. Recitative "Ach, wer die Frucht des Kreuzes nur bedachte"
3. Aria "Ich küsse die Rute mit freudigem Mute"
4. Recitative "Und zwar, was sag ich weiter"
5. Aria "Ach, mein Heiland, würd ich doch morgen"

In the first aria, the singer is ready to take part in the way of the Cross. The German Kreuzweg means specifically the Stations of the Cross, but more generally a path following Jesus. The recitative, "Ah, whoever reflected the fruit of the Cross", expands that being Christian is connected to bearing hardship. A line from the hymn "Was Gott tut, das ist wohlgetan" is quoted in text and melody.

The central aria, in a major key, begins with an exalted acceptance of hardship and punishment, "I kiss the whip with joyful courage". It claims that the "myrrhs of the pains are sugar to the heart". The second recitative expresses the hope that the "cross is my ladder to heaven". The concluding aria turns to longing for death as a way to Heaven, "Ah, my Saviour, if only I would [be lifted to Heaven] tomorrow". The singer expects "yes" ("Ja") to the question if the hour of departure will be soon. For this final line, the music is lively, and the hoped-for "yes" is repeated several times, the last time after a rest, and in low register.

== Performances and recordings ==
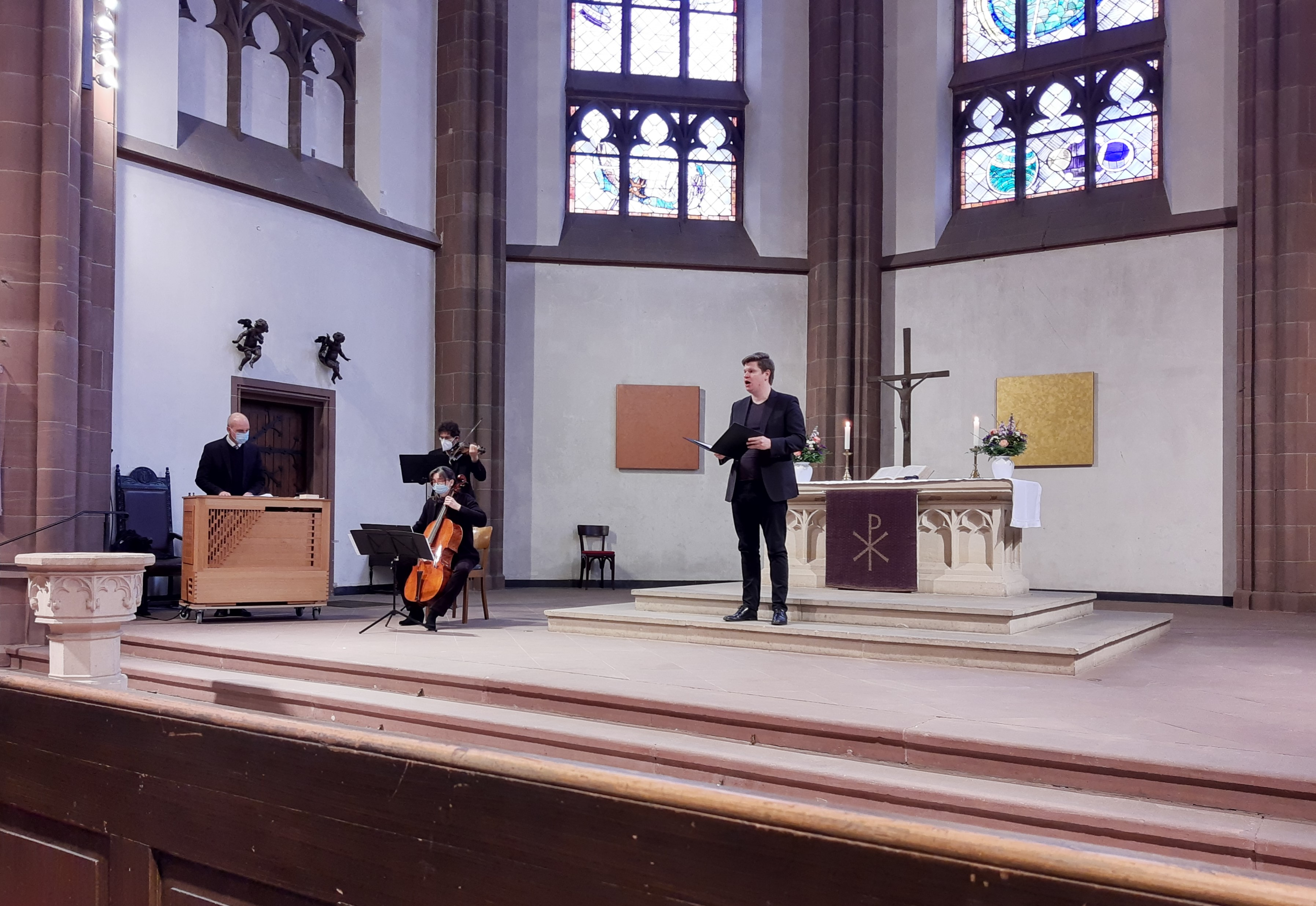
Performance in a cantata service at the Dreikönigskirche, Frankfurt, by Johannes Hill and the Telemann Ensemble, on 21 March 2021 during the COVID-19 epidemic

The cantata was first recorded in 2009 by bass Klaus Mertens with the ensemble Accademia Daniel conducted by Shalev Ad-El from the keyboard, in a collection of five church cantatas by Telemann titled Passion Cantatas. Peter Kooy was the soloist, with the ensemble L'Armonia Sonora, for a recording in 2017 as part of the album Telemann: Die stille Nacht of solo cantatas, arias and chamber music by Telemann. The cantata was performed in a series of cantata services at the Dreikönigskirche, Frankfurt on 21 March 2021 during the COVID-19 epidemic, with Johannes Hill as the singer and the Telemann Ensemble Frankfurt.

== Sources ==
- Krausse, Helmut K. (1986). "Erdmann Neumeister und die Kantatentexte Johann Sebastian Bachs". In Schulze, Hans-Joachim; Wolff, Christoph (eds.). Bach-Jahrbuch 1986. Bach-Jahrbuch (in German). Vol. 72. Neue Bachgesellschaft. Berlin: Evangelische Verlagsanstalt (published 1985). pp. 7–31. doi:10.13141/bjb.v1986. ISSN 0084-7682 – via Qucosa.
