= Denzinger =

Denzinger may refer to:

- Franz Josef Denzinger (1821–1894), German architect and church builder
- Heinrich Joseph Dominicus Denzinger (1819–1883), German Catholic theologian
  - Enchiridion symbolorum, definitionum et declarationum de rebus fidei et morum, a compilation of Catholic documents referred to as the Denzinger after its first editor, Heinrich Joseph Dominicus Denzinger
- Jakob Denzinger (1924–2016), Croatian-American concentration camp guard during the Holocaust
