= Piscatorial eclogue =

Genre of poetry

The piscatorial eclogue is a genre of poetry from Renaissance Italy. A variation on the pastoral, it substitutes fishermen at sea for shepherds in the fields. It originated in the 1490s, with the Neapolitan poet Jacopo Sannazaro's Eclogae piscatoriae.

Other examples of the genre include Ecloga Carolina by André de Resende (1558/9) and Almon by Antonio Querenghi (1566). Resende's poem, rendered in English prose, begins:

Quite often, when the bright moon recedes from the sea, already fleeing the yellow sands of the radiant Tagus, with home-coming face, and the golden sun (lofty torch of the starry sky) follows his sister with his radiance as he rises, the watchful fisherm an drags shoals into his nets from the placid ocean, and they provide wretched sailors with recompense for a wretched night, bought with great labour, though the cloudy Southerly might come with vast force, churning up the waters of the sea and nearby river. But now we have tossed our nets so often into the sea's waters, and yet these shores deny us a catch of fish.
