= Jacopo Gaddi =

Italian writer

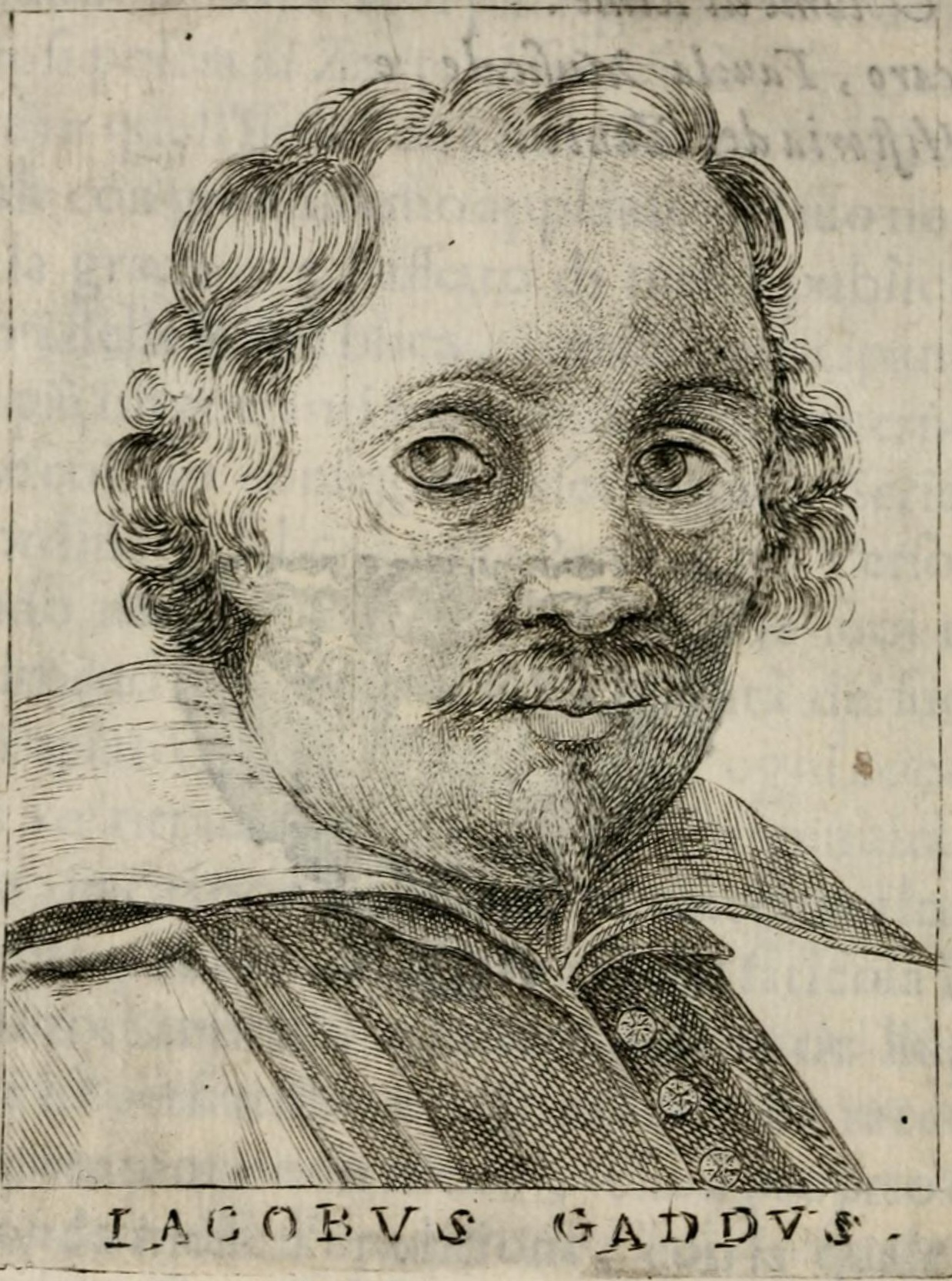
Jacopo Gaddi. From the book "Le glorie degli Incogniti", 1647

Jacopo Gaddi (c. 1600 – after 1658) was an Italian Neo-Latin and Italian writer from Florence.

== Biography ==
Born to a wealthy noble family, Gaddi was well known in Florence and was in correspondence with numerous figures outside his birthplace, including cardinals of the Roman curia, the painter Cristofano Allori, and, during his sojourn in Florence, English writer John Milton.

In 1628 he published a volume of Latin Poemata. Between 1636 and 1637 he published several works in Italian and Latin, including Elogia, Adlocutiones, and some short historical essays and poems. In two folios in 1648 and 1649 Gaddi published his most ambitious work, De Scriptoribus non-Ecclesiasticis, Graecis, Latinis, Italicis.

Gaddi was a member of the Florentine Academy (from 1620) and the host of his own Svogliati ("Will-less"), a literary group that met at its peak around 1638 in his home on the Piazza Madonna, where he kept a distinguished library and gallery of paintings.

== Example ==
Gaddi was fond of turning historical minutiae into short poems, as in this Latin example, De Nerio II et Antonio II Acciaiolis fratribus ducibus Athenarum, which celebrates the co-rule in Athens of the two Florentine brothers Nerio II and Antonio II Acciaioli:

Nobile par fratrum, Graecos Dux rexit uterque

Non simul, alterno tempore sceptra ferens.

Gesserat haec Nerius, quo pulso Antonius ardens

Rursus at extincto fratre gerit Nerius.

Nimium Pollux et Castor in urbe fuissent,

Si fratrum illis gratia sanctus amor.
