= Accademia degli Occulti =

Accademia degli Occulti was a learned society founded in Brescia around the middle of the sixteenth century. Various dates are given for its founding: 1563, 1565 or 1567. There is evidence that it may have existed as early as 1553. Its "prince", Alfonso Capriolo, is even said to have founded it as early as 1540.

The Occulti had written rules and formed a relatively long-lived and stable society until its disappearance sometime after 1623, when it is last mentioned. It was most active in the period around 1568–1570, when it published two collections of poetry. The Rime degli Academici occulti of 1568 is structured as fourteen chapters, each on a member of the academy. Each begins with the member's impresa (device), including an image and a motto; a prose commentary on the same by the academy's secretary, Bartolomeo Arnigio; and a poem. Contributing poets include Antonio Querenghi and Alberto Lollio. The Occulti are also notable for their interest in natural philosophy. Agostino Gallo was a member.
