= Antonio Querenghi =

Italian scholar (1546–1633)

Engraving of Querenghi

Antonio Querenghi or Quarenghi (Italian pronunciation: [anˈtɔːnjo kweˈreŋɡi, -ˈrɛŋɡi, - kwaˈ-]; 1546–1633) was an Italian lawyer, theologian and poet. A native of Padua, he belonged to the same intellectual circle as Galileo. Most of his career was spent in Rome, where he served several cardinals and popes. He composed poetry in both Neo-Latin and the Italian vernacular.

== Life ==
Querenghi was born in Padua in 1546, the second son of Niccolò Querenghi and Elisabetta Ottellio. After the death of their father in 1548, he and his elder brother Marco were entrusted to the care of their maternal grandfather, Gaspare Ottellio, notary of the bishop of Padua and chancellor of Padua Cathedral. While Marco followed Gaspare in diocesan service, Antonio was sent to the University of Padua, graduating with a degree in both canon and civil law in 1571 and in theology in 1573. In 1573, he joined the Accademia degli Animosi.

Querenghi was a disciple of Sperone Speroni and had ties of friendship with Torquato Tasso, Jacopo Mazzoni and Paolo Beni. In 1579–1580, he moved to Rome and entered the entourage of Cardinal Flavio Orsini. From 1581 to 1592, he was part of the following of Cardinal Innico d'Avalos. In 1592, he attached himself to the private academy of Cardinal Cinzio Aldobrandini, whose members included Tasso and Francesco Patrizi, who had written Querenghi into his dialogue L'amorosa filosofia in 1577.

In Rome, Querenghi often visited the church of Santa Maria in Vallicella to see Filippo Neri. He also ingratiated himself with the popes. Sixtus V (r. 1585–1590) granted him the provostry of the Scala Sancta. In 1592, Clement VIII named him secretary of the College of Cardinals, succeeding Silvio Antoniano. In November 1595, Clement appointed him to a canonry in Padua Cathedral.

In 1595, through the intercession of Federico Borromeo, Querenghi was also appointed court historian to Ranuccio Farnese, Duke of Parma. He left for Parma in 1597 to research his Belgica historia. Towards the end of the year, he returned to Padua, where he remained until April 1605 apart from visits to Parma in 1599–1600 and 1603. On 12 March 1600, he joined the Accademia dei Ricovrati, where he supported the pope's grandnephew, Silvestro Aldobrandini, for the rectorship. In Padua, he was part of the intellectual circle as Galileo Galilei, who dedicated to him his Dialogo de Cecco di Ronchitti da Bruzene in perpuosito de la stella Nuova in 1605.

In 1605, Querenghi returned to Rome, where Pope Paul V named him a secret chamberlain and referendary of the Apostolic Signatura. In 1607, in cooperation with Caspar Schoppe, he sought to reconcile Paul V with Paolo Sarpi and Tommaso Campanella, who wrote him a letter of gratitude from prison. In February 1609, he became secretary to Cardinal Alessandro d'Este. He was in Modena on the cardinal's behalf in 1609 and 1612. In 1611, he joined the Accademia degli Umoristi. In 1614–1615, he worked for Alessandro Tassoni, helping him edit La secchia rapita.

By 1615, Querenghi was regarded as one of the exemplary members of the older generation of humanist in Rome. That year, Vincenzo Gramigna published a dialogue inspired by him, entitled Il Querenghi, overo della generosità. Pope Urban VIII (r. 1623–1644) also cited Querenghi as an example for the younger generation. In 1621, Querenghi moved from the household of Cardinal d'Este to that of Cardinal Ludovico Ludovisi. He died at Rome on 1 September 1633. He was buried in San Francesco a Ripa.

== Works ==
In 1566, Querenghi published a piscatorial eclogue, Almon, at Padua. In 1568, he contributed three songs (carmina) and a sonnet to the Tempio, an anthology published at Padua in honour of Geronima Colonna d'Aragona by Lorenzo Pasquato. Between 1568 and 1570, he wrote twelve sonnets and twelve other poems for two collections published by the Accademia degli Occulti in Brescia.

In 1576, Querenghi provided an introductory poem in hexameters for Niccolò Contarini's De perfectione rerum and another introductory poem for Stefano Tiepolo's Academicae contemplationes. In 1579, one of his Sapphic odes, Ad naturam, was included in an appendix to Alessandro Carriero's Possint ne arte simplicia veraque metalla gigni.

In 1582, Querenghi wrote a poem in praise of the Roman College built by Gregory XIII. In 1586, he wrote five poems on the relocation of the Vatican Obelisk to Saint Peter's Square.

Querenghi wrote several works for the Ricovrati, including the speech Dell'antro platonico, o vero della circonduzione socratica and the poem Panegirico in lode della poesia (read 7 June 1604). Between 1609 and 1612, he exchanged correspondence with Giovanni Battista Guarini, who was instrumental in getting him admitted to the Umoristi.

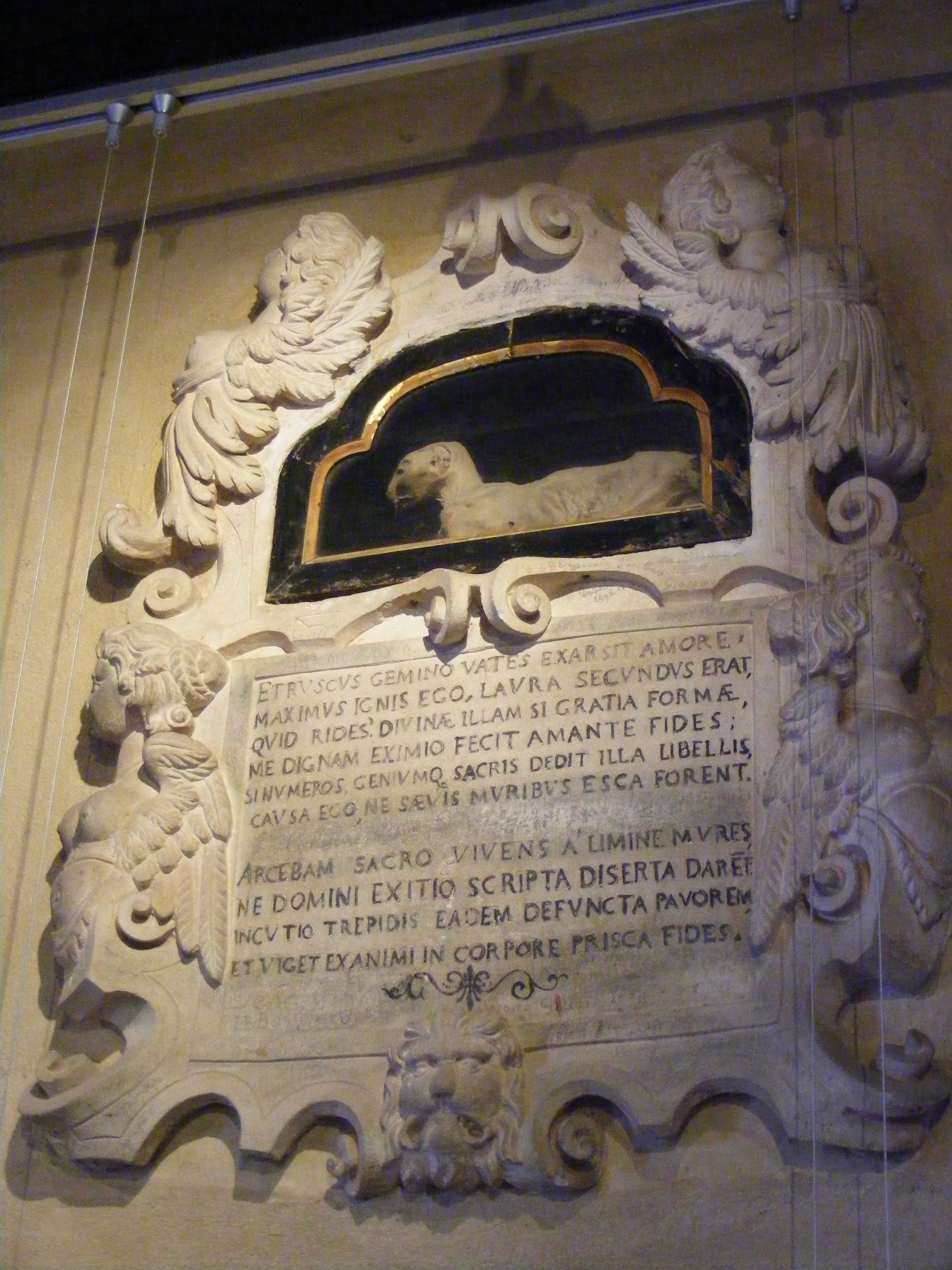
Petrarch's mummified cat and Querenghi's inscription

Querenghi was not a successful historian. His Belgica historia, an account of the exploits of Ranuccio's father, Alessandro Farnese, in the Eighty Years' War, was never finished. He was still working on it in 1610, when he complained that the Farnese secretaries and archivists were uncooperative. In 1607, he refused Pope Paul V's request to write a history of the Venetian Interdict, and he refused Alessandro d'Este's request for a history of the War of the Montferrat Succession in 1613.

Querenghi wrote a humorous epitaph in Latin verse for Petrarch's cat in the Casa del Petrarca in Arquà. In 1613, he provided the Latin inscriptions in hexameters for the base of a column in the Piazza Santa Maria Maggiore. His vernacular poetry collection Poesie volgari was published five times during his life (Modena, 1616; Rome, 1616 and 1621; Padua, 1622; Venice, 1626). His Carmina was published four times (Cologne, 1616; Roma, 1618, 1621 and 1629). These late poems concerned ethics and wisdom.

Querenghi is one of the Romans portrayed by John Barclay in his Argenis, first printed at Paris in 1621. Querenghi contributed a poem to the first edition, although it was rarely included in later editions.

Querenghi wrote a panegyric of Prince Władysław Vasa, Carmen ad Urbem Romam in adventu Serenissimi Vladislai Poloniae Principis. It was read on 19 January 1625 before the Roman curia.

== Bibliography ==
- Franczak, Grzegorz (2013). "Antonio Querenghi, Carmen ad Urbem Romam in adventu Serenissimi Vladislai Poloniae Principis (1625)". Terminus. 15 (2): 295–305. doi:10.4467/20843844TE.13.018.1575.
- IJsewijn, J. (1983). "John Barclay and His Argenis: A Scottish Neo-Latin Novelist". Humanistica Lovaniensia. 32: 1–27. JSTOR 23974241.
- J. O. B. (1852). "The Last Lay of Petrarch's Cat". Notes and Queries. 5 (121): 174.
- Motta, Uberto (1997). Antonio Querenghi (1546–1633): un letterato padovano nella Roma del tardo Rinascimento. Pubblicazioni dell'Università Cattolica. ISBN 978-8-83-430497-6.
- Motta, Uberto (2016). "Querenghi, Antonio". Dizionario Biografico degli Italiani, Volume 86: Querenghi–Rensi (in Italian). Rome: Istituto dell'Enciclopedia Italiana. ISBN 978-8-81200032-6.
- Peruzzi, Giulio (2010). "A New Physics to Support the Copernican System: Gleanings from Galileo's Works" (PDF). Proceedings of the International Astronomical Union. 6 (S269): 20–26.
- Trapp, Joseph Burney (2006). "Petrarchan Places. An Essay in the Iconography of Commemoration". Journal of the Warburg and Courtauld Institutes. 69 (1): 1–50. JSTOR 40025839.
