= Italian Association for Speech Sciences =

Italian non-profit speech sciences organization

The Italian Association for Speech Sciences (Italian: Associazione Italiana di Scienze della Voce, AISV) is an Italian non-profit organization promoting speech communication, science and technology. They are a special interest group of the International Speech Communication Association. It was established on December 3, 2003 in Padua.

While the association seeks to promote all aspects of speech sciences in Italy, the association is especially concerned with phonetics, speech signal processing, and the automatic treatment of language in voice man-machine interaction.
