= Franz Josef Denzinger =

German architect

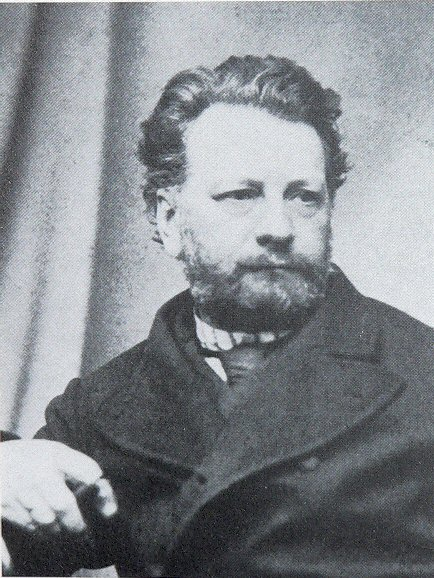
- Born: 24 February 1821; Liège
- Died: 14 February 1894 (aged 72); Nuremberg
- Other names: Franz Josef Ritter von Denzinger
- Occupation: Architect
- Projects: Dreikönigskirche, Frankfurt

Franz Josef Denzinger (24 February 1821 – 14 February 1894) was a German architect and church builder. His works include numerous churches, including in Regensburg and Frankfurt am Main.

== Life ==
Denzinger was born in Liège as the son of a university philosopher Ignacio Denzinger and Marie Thekla née Molitor. Franz Josef Denzinger was born in Liège as the son of the university professor of philosophy Ignaz Denzinger and his wife Marie Thekla née Molitor. The family moved to Würzburg in 1831, where the son attended grammar school and then studied "general" sciences at Julius Maximilians University, where his father taught as a full professor. From 1842/43 he studied engineering at the Royal Polytechnic Academy in Munich, as well as architecture at the Academy of Fine Arts. In 1846 he completed his training with the state examination as an engineer for the state building service for road, bridge and hydraulic engineering, in 1847 supplemented with the examination as an architect for civil engineering.

Denzinger worked for four years as an engineer in Donauwörth, Augsburg, Würzburg, Bad Kissingen, Bad Reichenhall, and Munich. In 1854 he was appointed as a civil engineer to Bamberg, but before taking up the position as a civil engineer he was sent to Regensburg, where he had to appraise and evaluate the spatial use of the Thon-Dittmer-Palais, which was then acquired by the city in 1856. Denzinger used the year 1855 for a study trip through the Austrian and German states but also to France, Belgium and Switzerland. In the same year, he married Hedwig Magdalena Genofeva von Stefenelli in Regensburg and built a new chemical laboratory in Erlangen in the following years. Decisive for his career was his appointment as a civil servant at the royal building authorities in Regensburg in 1858 and in the following year the appointment as a master builder in Regensburg by Bishop Ignatius of Senestrey. At the beginning of his term of office, the new bishop had set himself the goal of completing the medieval Regensburg Cathedral by expanding the two cathedral towers.

Both King Maximilian II and his father Ludwig I, who abdicated in 1848, urged him to do this because the cathedral had been the property of the Kingdom of Bavaria since 1810. A cathedral building association was founded to finance the construction. After fierce internal disputes between the state building authorities and the cathedral builder over the existing expansion plans, in which the bishop also vehemently interfered, the expansion of the cathedral towers was achieved under the direction of cathedral builder Denzinger according to his own designs in the years 1860 to 1669, always accompanied by good wishes from his supporter and patron Ludwig I. His wish to see the completion of his cathedral was not fulfilled because he died in 1868. During the years of construction, Denzinger was also busy with expert opinions on other church building projects in Ulm, Würzburg, Mainz, Bremerhaven and Partenkirchen. He had earned a great reputation in professional circles and had become a member of many supraregional building and scholar committees. After completing the work on the Regensburg cathedral towers, Denzinger was made an honorary citizen of Regensburg in June 1869 and awarded several medals. In 1869 Denzinger moved to Frankfurt am Main, where he managed the reconstruction of the cathedral, which burned down in 1867, as a master builder until 1877, the tower being given its new top according to the plans of the cathedral builder Madern Gerthener in 1415. During this work, in addition to extensive expert work, he also completed the transept at the Regensburg Cathedral using transept gables and crossing roof turrets. But instead of a crossing tower, according to medieval findings, only a wooden roof turret could be realized, which was clad with zinc sheet. In 1879 Denzinger returned to the Bavarian civil service, became a government and district building officer in Bayreuth and continued to work extensively in the field of church building. In 1885 he was appointed senior building officer to Munich and retired in 1891. When he left civil service, he was raised to the personal nobility. On 14 February 1894 Denzinger died unexpectedly of a stroke while traveling as a member of the jury for an architecture competition in Nuremberg. He was buried in the Old Munich North Cemetery.
