= Dreikönigskirche, Frankfurt =

Church building in Frankfurt, Germany

Dreikönigskirche
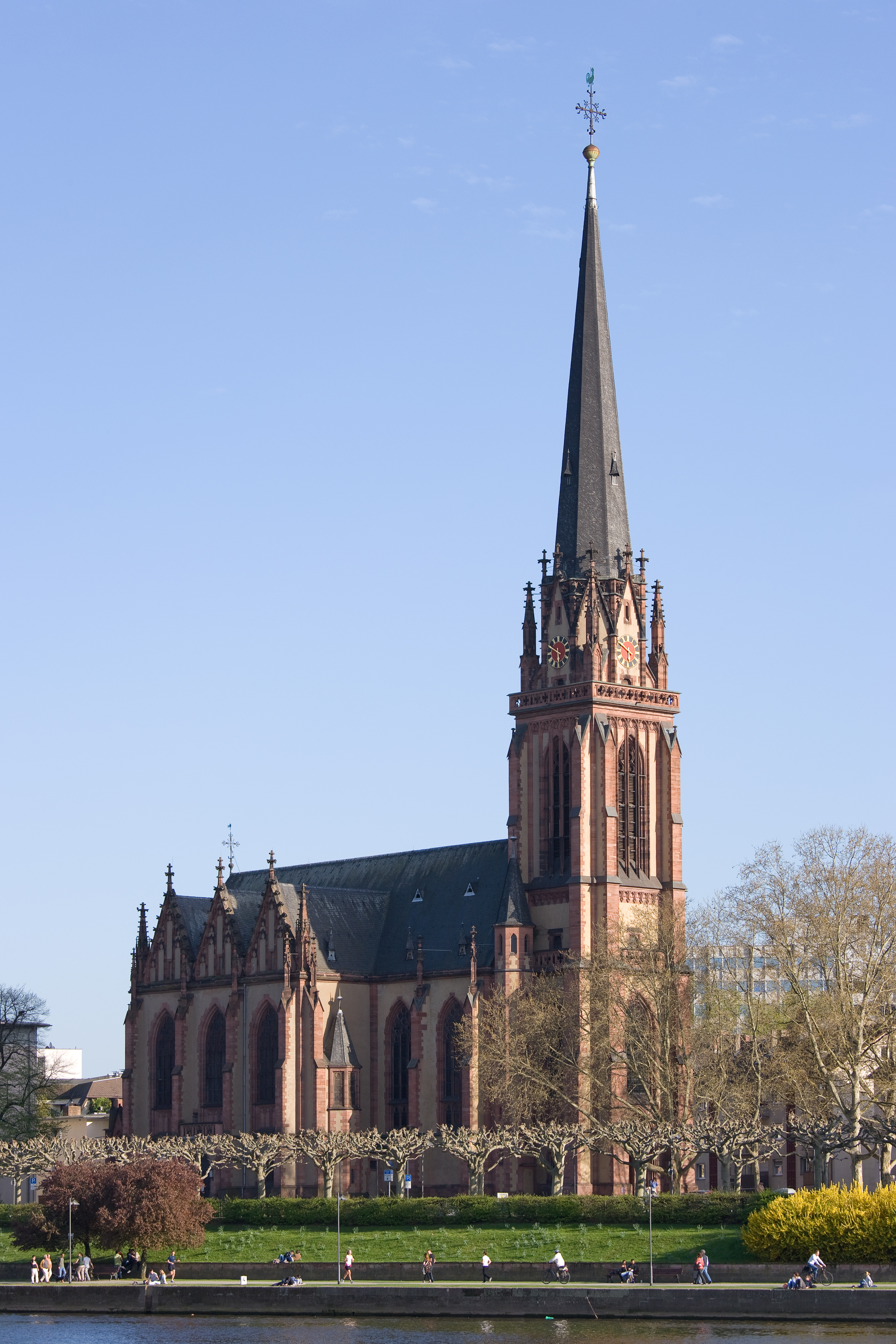
- Dreikönigskirche
- 50°6′26″N 8°41′7″E
- Location: Frankfurt, Hesse, Germany
- Denomination: Lutheran
- Previous denomination: Roman Catholic
- Website: www.dreikoenigsgemeinde.de

History
- Dedication: Three Kings (1340)
- Consecrated: 1881

Architecture
- Architect: Franz Josef Denzinger

The Dreikönigskirche (English: Church of the Three Kings) is a Lutheran Protestant church and parish in Frankfurt, the city's largest Protestant parish. It is located on the south bank of the Main in Sachsenhausen, opposite the Frankfurt Cathedral. The present church building, replacing an older church, was erected from 1875 to 1880 on designs by Franz Josef Denzinger in Gothic revival style. It features stained glass windows by Charles Crodel, installed in 1956, and an organ by Karl Schuke from Berlin completed in 1961.

After World War II, the church developed into a centre of church music, with Kurt Thomas as the church musician and Helmut Walcha as the organist. It offers cantata services and concerts. The church is a listed monument, basically preserved as originally designed.

== History ==
At the location of the present church, in Sachsenhausen on the Main, across the river from the Frankfurt Cathedral, a hospital chapel was consecrated to the Three Kings (Drei Könige) in 1340. The three Kings were the patron saints of travellers, and suitable for a city at the trade road along the Main. The church was a simple hall church with two naves in Gothic style. For a long time, the priests came from the Cathedral parish, which meant that no priest was available during the night when the gates of the city were closed. In 1452, the Dreikönigs parish finally became independent, and the church a filial church.

The Reformation began in Frankfurt in 1522. In 1525, the Dreikönigskirche was the first church in Frankfurt with exclusively Protestant pastors. In 1531, the city employed a third pastor, Peter Pfeiffer from the Barfüßerkloster, which ended the discrimination that Sachsenhausen Christians had felt for centuries. From 1690, the interior was remodelled in Baroque style.

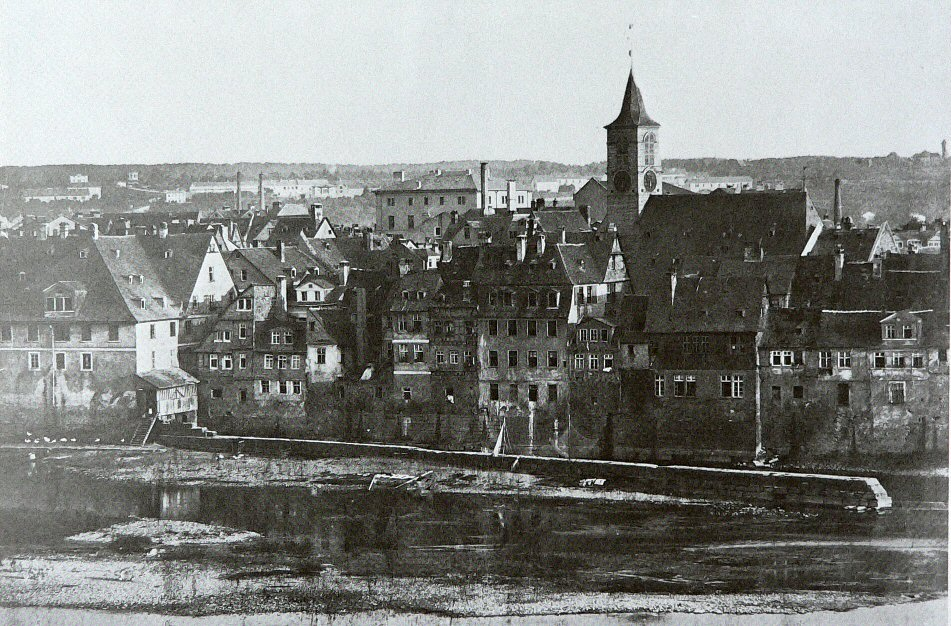
Old Dreikönigskirche on the Main in 1859

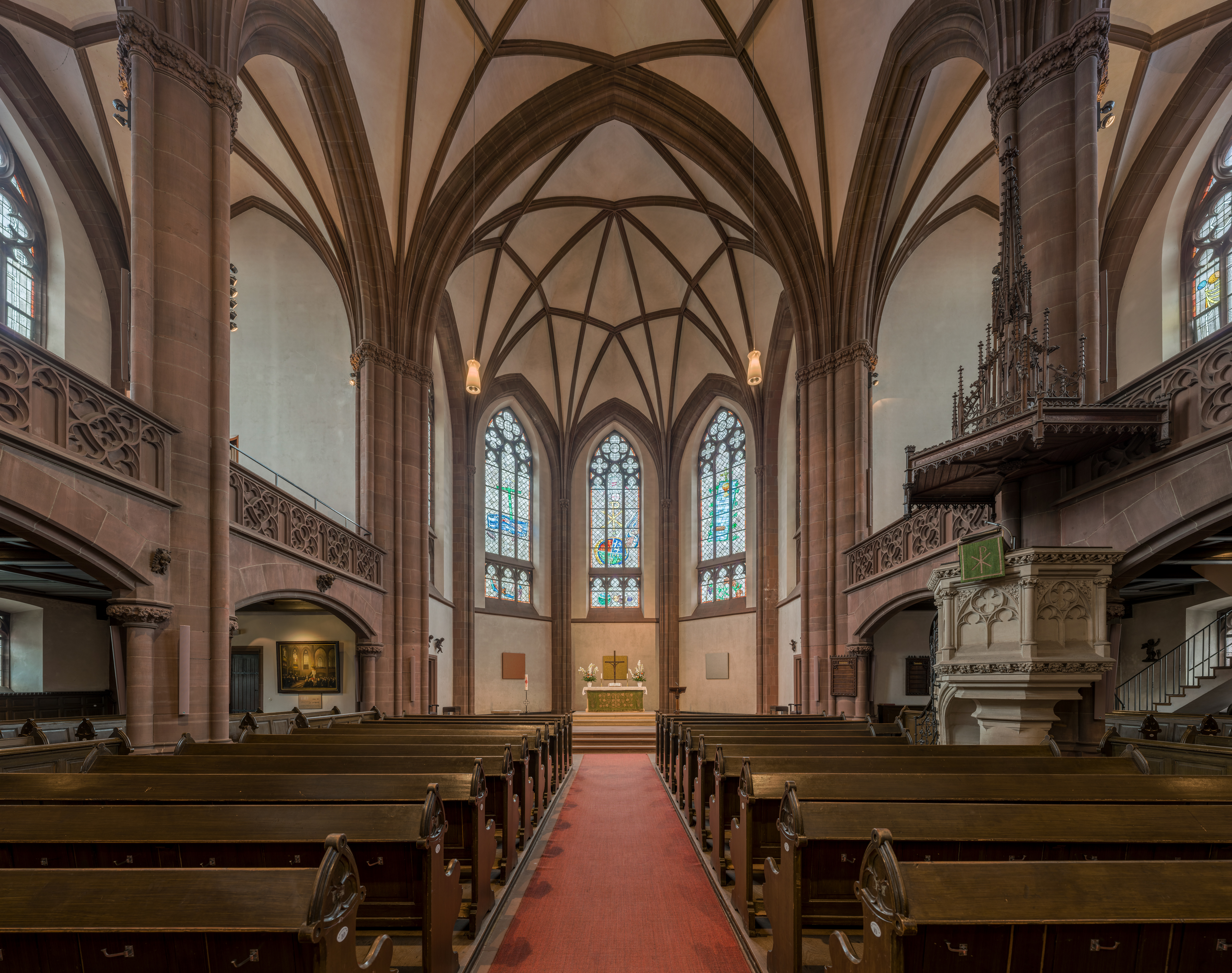
Interior

When the church building deteriorated in the 19th century. Friedrich Heß, responsible for building in the city, voted for demolishing it and replacing it with a new church. The 1829/30 contract (Dotationsvertrag) between Frankfurt and its Christian churches made the city responsible for the maintenance of church buildings, including organs. In 1869, Franz Josef Denzinger was called to Frankfurt to restore the Frankfurt Cathedral which had been destroyed by fire in 1867. He suggested a new building of the Dreikönigskirche. His plans were accepted in 1872 by the Magistrat. The last service in the old church was held in April 1872, and it was demolished in 1875. The new church was completed in 1880. It was consecrated on 8 May 1881.

Under the Nazi regime, the parish was the first in Frankfurt to join the Bekennende Kirche in 1934. Unlike other churches in Frankfurt, the Dreikönigskirche was not severely damaged by bombing during World War II. The windows were destroyed when the bridges were dynamited in 1945. In 1956, stained-glass windows by Charles Crodel were installed. A new organ was built by Karl Schuke Berliner Orgelbauwerkstatt from Berlin in 1961, following a disposition by Helmut Walcha.

The interior of the church has basically been preserved as originally designed. It is a listed monument for historic reasons.

The parish runs a parish hall in the Tucholskystraße. It belongs to the Protestant Church in Hesse and Nassau, and is its largest parish in Frankfurt.

== Architecture ==
Denzinger designed the church in Gothic revival style, the first and last major church in Frankfurt in that style. The main entrance of the church in the west tower is reached from a small square. The high tower on a square floor dominates the skyline. It was planned to correspond to the Cathedral tower and was at 80 m (260 ft) the second-highest building in the city at the time. The nave extends over five bays. Three front bays are lined by side aisles with sandstone balconies. The choir is a polygon. Denzinger took elements such as net vaulting of the nave, the pulpit, and filigree tracery from late-Gothic style, while round pillars belong to an earlier style. The interior features remnants of the Baroque period of the older church. The church seats 840 people.

== Church music ==
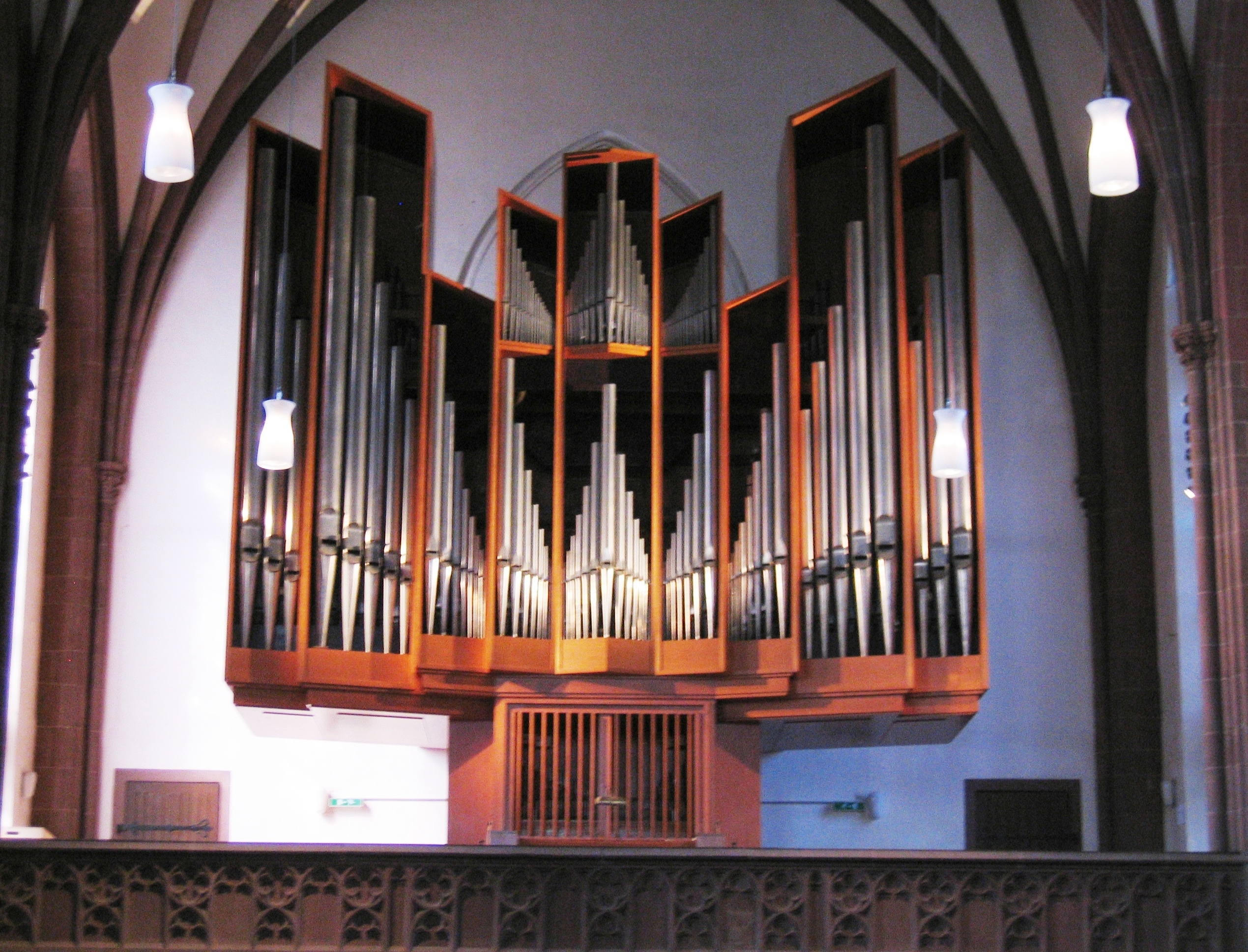
Schuke Organ

After World War II, church music became a focus at the Dreikönigskirche, with Kurt Thomas as the church musician (Kantor) from 1945 to 1957, and Helmut Walcha as the organist from 1946 to 1981. Thomas founded an a cappella choir at the church, first called Chor der Dreikönigskirche, then Frankfurter Kantorei, which received international recognition. The choir performed the world premiere of Kurt Hessenberg's St Luke Passion at the Dreikönigskirche in 1978, initiated and conducted by Helmuth Rilling, also many Bach cantatas and compositions by Thomas. The church was a leading venue of major church concerts in Frankfurt until the opening of the Alte Oper as a concert hall in 1981.

The present organ was completed in 1961, with Walcha's disposition, by the organ builder Karl Schuke from Berlin. It has 47 stops on three manuals and pedal. The instrument was a gift from the city of Frankfurt to honour Walcha's achievements as the organist.

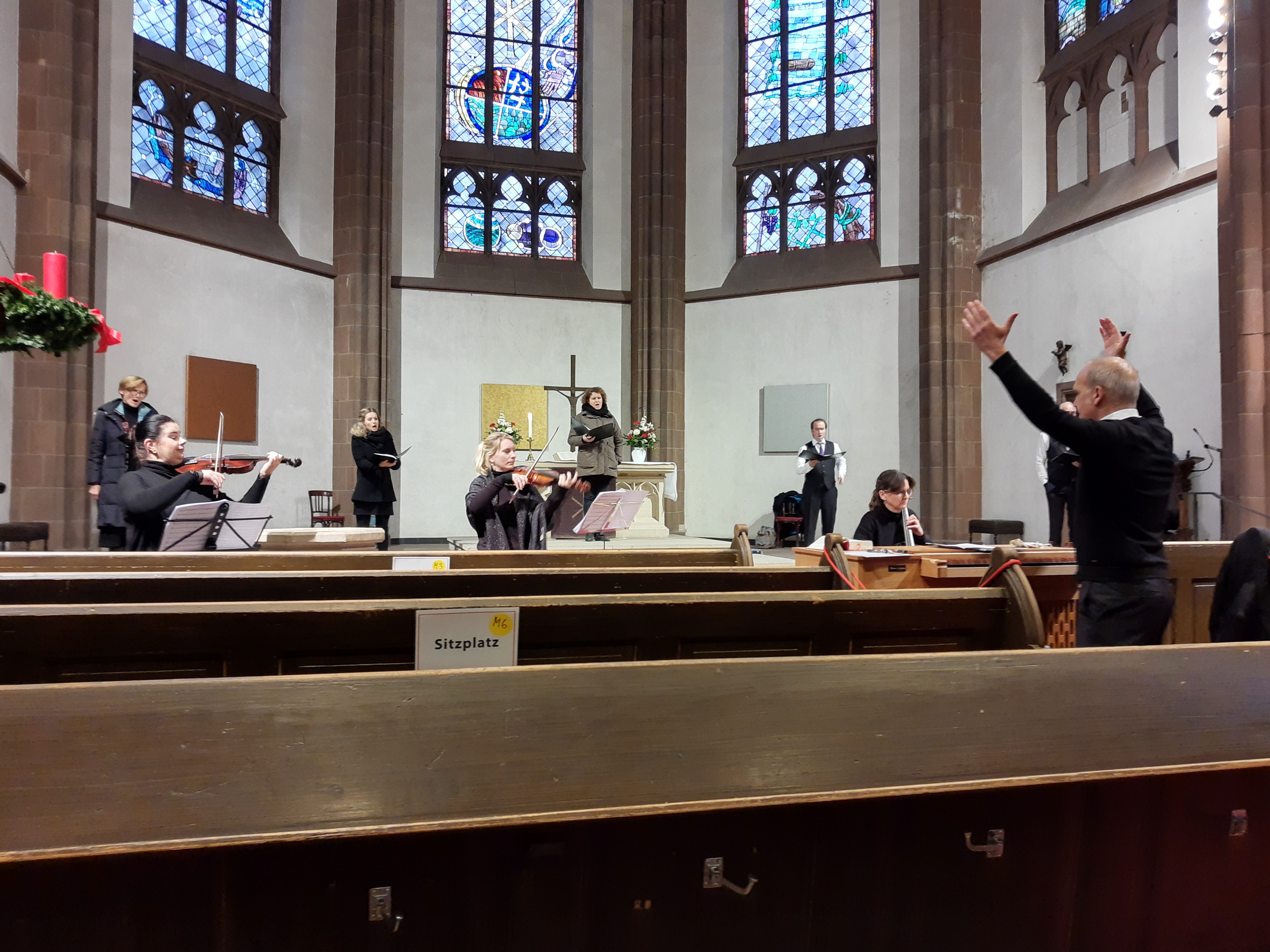
Cantata rehearsal, 29 November 2020, Georg Böhm: Nun komm, der Heiden Heiland

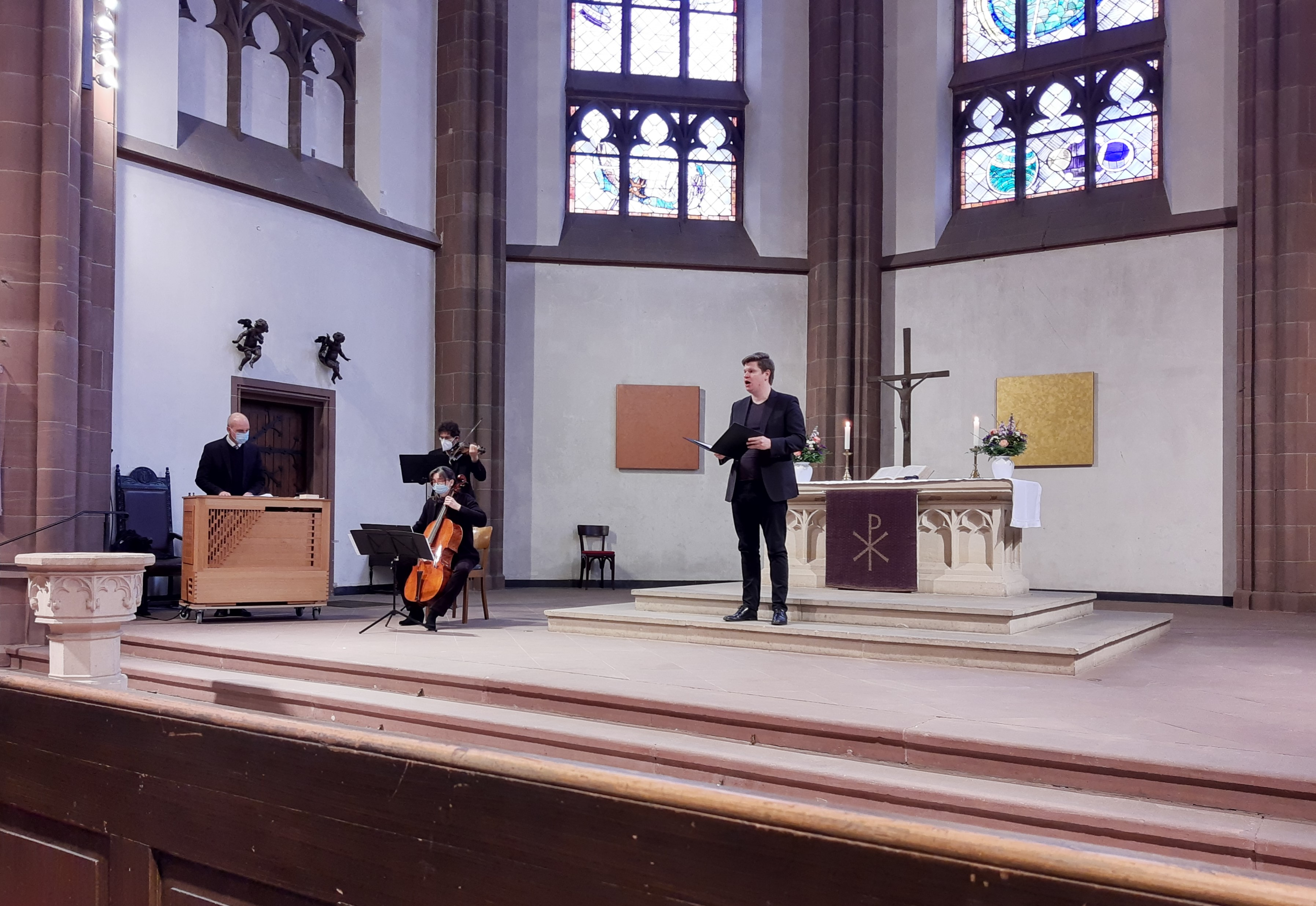
Cantata service, 21 March 2021, Telemann's Ich will den Kreuzweg gerne gehen, with baritone Johannes Hill

In 2020, during the COVID-19 epidemic, regular cantata services were resumed with solo cantatas. On the first Sunday in Advent, Georg Böhm's cantata Nun komm, der Heiden Heiland was featured, with soloists Gabriele Hierdeis, Lieselotte Fink, Anne Bierwirth, Georg Poplutz and Markus Flaig, and the Telemann Ensemble Frankfurt, conducted by Andreas Köhs. A cantata service on New Year's Eve 2020 featured Bach's cantata Gottlob! nun geht das Jahr zu Ende, BWV 28 (Praise God! For now the year is ending), with soloists Simone Schwark, Julia Diefenbach, Poplutz and Flaig. In a service during Lent, they performed Telemann's cantata Ich will den Kreuzweg gerne gehen, composed while he was music director in Frankfurt, on 21 March 2021 with Johannes Hill as the soloist.
