= Pontifical Academy of Fine Arts and Letters of the Virtuosi al Pantheon =

Pontifical academy of fine art

Coordinates: 41°53′48″N 12°28′17″E

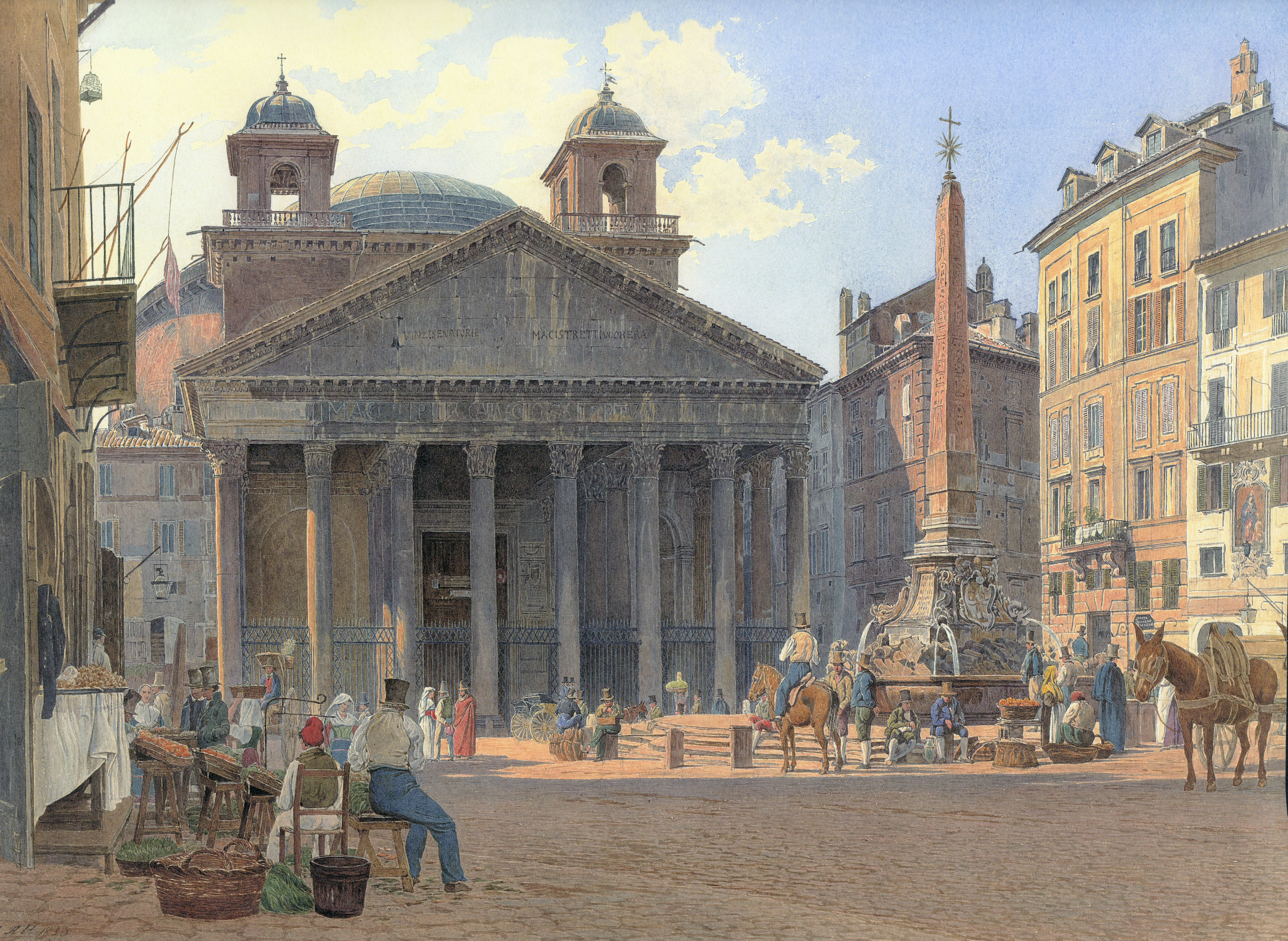
Pantheon in Rome in 1836, by Jakob Alt

The Pontifical Academy of Fine Arts and Letters of the Virtuosi al Pantheon is one of the Pontifical Academies under the direction of the Holy See. The complete Italian name of the academy, Pontificia Insigne Accademia di Belle Arti e Letteratura dei Virtuosi al Pantheon, includes the adjective insigne (illustrious), often omitted in official English translations. The term Virtuosi al Pantheon (virtuosos of the Pantheon) is also usually left untranslated, but, in any event, should not be taken in the English musical sense of "virtuoso" but rather "artists of great merit". The Pantheon in Rome was the historical home of the academy. The term "academy" is meant in the Italian Renaissance definition of the term as an association of learned persons and not an institution of instruction.

== History ==
The academy was founded as the "Congregation of Saint Joseph of the Holy Land" in 1542 under the auspices of the Cistercian monk, Desiderio d'Adiutorio and was recognized by Pope Paul III on October 15, 1542. From its inception, the academy has counted among its members many important artists who have left their mark in Rome. Since the 17th century, exhibits have often taken place beneath the portico of the Pantheon, the historical home of the organization.

In 1837, a new statute in the Papal States provided funds for annual art competitions. The title "Pontifical" was conferred by Pope Pius IX in 1861 and "Academy" was added by Pope Pius XI in 1928. A new statute in 1995 defines the goal of the academy as one of "favoring the study and practice of letters and fine arts with particular regard to sacred art and Christian literature ... in collaboration with the Pontifical Council for Culture".

With Pope Francis' reorganization of the Roman Curia as of 5 June 2022 as provided for in the apostolic constitution Praedicate evangelium, the new Dicastery for Culture and Education became responsible for coordinating the work of this academy with its own work and that of a number of other bodies.

== Organisation ==
The “entry level” members of the Virtuosi are called “academics”; from that group, the Pope nominates candidates for the “ordinary” group, who then are termed “emeritus” upon reaching 80 years of age. There are 50 “ordinary” virtuosi divided into five disciplines: architects, painters and film-makers, sculptors, academics dedicated to art and music, and poets and authors. The president of the academy is appointed by the Pontiff for a term of five years and may be reappointed. The president is also a member of the coordinating council for Pontifical Academies.

The academy typically sponsors art exhibits, presentation of poetry and literature, discussions, and visits to historic sites in Rome. Since 2016, the president of the academy is Pio Baldi. The current secretary is Ernesto Lamagna. The current premises of the academy are at Piazza della Cancelleria 1 in Vatican City in Rome.

== See also ==
- Global organisation of the Catholic Church
- Index of Vatican City-related articles
