= Accademia Italiana Skopje =

- Motto: The World is in your hand. Design it!
- Type: Private
- Established: 2006
- Location: Skopje, Republic of Macedonia
- Website: www.accademiaitaliana.com

The students’ exhibition displayed in the National Gallery “Mala Stanica" as a part of the Skopje Summer Festival, 2007

Accademia Italiana Skopje is a fashion and design institute that is an affiliate center of the Accademia Italiana. The Skopje campus accepts students from the Balkan region, and offers design degrees recognized by the Ministry of Education and Science in North Macedonia, valid in more than 40 European countries. Lessons at this center are held in English.

It has programs in fashion design, interior and product design, and visual communications.
