= Accademia Italiana di Lingua =

Location
- Casella Postale 815; IT-50123 Firenze; Italia; Florence; Italy

Information
- School type: Italian as a second language
- Established: 1984
- Website: www.acad.it

The Accademia Italiana di Lingua (AIL) is a professional association of schools, institutions and experts in the field of teaching Italian as a foreign language. They organise instruction and testing of students interested in having a diploma for Italian language studies. The AIL initiated the first diploma exams for the study of modern Italian.

== History ==
The Accademia Italiana di Lingua ("Italian Academy of Languages") was founded in Florence in 1984 as a non profit association between private and public schools, teaching Italian as a second and a foreign language. The Association was supported by the European Council's recommendations suggesting a range of diverse levels of competence.

The first exam the Association conceived was the DALI, C1 advanced level (1984) followed by DILI, B1 intermediate level (1993) and the last one was the DELI, A1/A2 basic level (1995).

The DALC, C1 advanced commercial language's diploma was introduced in 1995, while the DILC, B1 intermediate commercial language's diploma dates back 2002.

Starting from 2005, the AIL offer range has grown rich with DILI B2, Intermediate level 2 exam which, being included between DILI B1 and DALI C1, goes to check the candidates' linguistic abilities on B2 level.

Since 2007 the AIL DILC - B1 Examination has been recognized by the UFFT (Swiss Federal Office for professional education and technology) as final Exam of Italian as a second national language for all the professional commercial schools of the Helvetic Confederation.

The AIL organizes preparation courses for every level in their exam centers.

== AIL Certificates ==
AIL offers the following exams:

- DELI A2: The first level examination. By passing this examination, the candidate has shown that he is able to understand the main structures of the Italian language. He is able to read simple texts and he can communicate in elementary everyday situations.
- DILI B1: The Intermediate level 1 of examination. By passing this examination, the candidate has shown that he is able to communicate, both orally and in writing in all everyday situations. He is also able to understand texts that deal with topics of everyday life and can express his own opinions in writing.
- DILI B2: The third level examination, Intermediate level 2, continues increasing in the difficulty of the Italian involved. By passing this examination, the candidate has shown that he is able to interact, both orally and in writing, in Italian about expected complexity subjects he is acquainted with.
- DALI C1: The highest level of examination. By passing this examination, the candidate has proved that his knowledge of Italian language enables him to express himself correctly, both orally and in writing, with the complexity expected of everyday language skills. Additionally, he can understand and compose written texts.
- DILC B1: This is a supplementary examination on Intermediate level 1, specific to Italian language of business and tourism. By passing this examination in Italian business language, the candidate has shown that he is able to communicate, both orally and in writing, in all everyday situations. He understands conversations that deal with topics of economy and can express his own opinions in writing.
- DALC C1: This is an advanced level examination specific to Italian language of business and tourism. By passing this examination in Italian business language, the candidate has shown the ability to communicate, in any situation requiring a strong knowledge of commercial Italian: correspondence, public relations, specialized literature, secretarial work, business meetings, etc.

All of these exams are offered four times a year.

Diploma examinations "Firenze" in written and spoken Italian for various ability levels are held two or four times a year. Testing centres are located in Italy, Croatia, Serbia, and Switzerland. The exams are one of a kind, and the correction of the written portions along with final evaluation are carried out in the main Florence office in order to guarantee uniform evaluation for all students.

== Qualification Eligibility ==
The Qualification is open to all foreign applicants wishing to validate their abilities in Italian language once registered.

== Procedure ==
Diploma examinations "Firenze" in written and spoken Italian for the various ability levels are held four times a year in examination centers worldwide. An applicant wishing to obtain an Italian Language diploma “Firenze” must register and pay (prices varying) at least one month before the official sitting of the exam in order to sit the examination that seems suitable for him/her. When an applicant has completed the exam, the AIL evaluates it according to European Union guidelines and awards the official qualification three months after its sitting. The exams are one of a kind and the correction of the written portions as well as the final evaluation are carried out in the main Florence office in order to guarantee a uniform evaluation. Candidates who receive the qualification do so through successfully passing one of the examinations.

The AIL has designed preparation courses which last from one to twelve months depending on the level of Italian that the candidate must have in order to take the examination. Each school or institution affiliated with AIL is an examination center and each examination center regularly offers preparation courses.
