= Norman Academy =

The Norman Academy (Italian: Accademia Normanna) is an organization established for the promotion of the Arts and Letters, Humanities and Human rights defense throughout the world, incorporated in the State of Florida, United States. It operates also in Rome, Italy, and Banjul, the Gambia.

The Academic Senate awards each year The Capitoline Gold, its highest prize, to figures from around the world for social solidarity, cultural development, political accomplishments, economic contribution, research and science in general.

Attached to the Academy is the unaccredited university "Studiorum Universitas Ruggero II", which issues honorary degrees based on life experience.
