= Ernesto Lamagna =

Italian sculptor

Ernesto Lamagna (born 1945) is a contemporary Italian sculptor.

== Biography ==
He was born in Naples and lives and works in Rome. He studied at the Academy of Fine Arts in Naples and has presented in Italy and abroad. His works include:

the baptistery and the five-meter-tall Madonna of Notre Dame du Liban for the Maronite church in Sydney, Australia;
two sculptures of angels for the Blafford-Owen collection in Houston;
the bronze portal entrance to the basilica of Santa Maria della Vittoria in San Vito dei Normanni, Italy;
bronze doors in the atrium of the Sanctuary of Our Lady of Bonaria in Cagliari in Sardinia;
the Angel of Peace for the atrium of the CNR (Italian National Research Council) headquarters in Rome;
the bronze Door of Life for the Mariano sanctuary in Rodi Garganico in Foggia, Italy;
the bronze doors for the San Filippo Neri oratory in Molfetta, Italy;
the Angel of the Third Millennium in Barletta, Italy;
the monument to Saint Benedict the Moor in San Fratello, Messina in Sicily, Italy;
the monuments within the Church of the Holy Spirit in Torremaggiore near Foggia, Italy;

Lamagna was the secretary for sculpture of the Pontifical Academy of Fine Arts and Letters, Virtuosi al Pantheon in Rome from 1998 to 2003. He is the creator of the processional hammer and cross used in 2000 for the Great Jubilee, which is now conserved in the Treasures of the Vatican museum. He participated in a collective exhibit in 2000 to which he contributed the Angel of Light now displayed in the State Basilica of Saint Mary of the Angels in Rome. He contributed the sculpture of Ecce mater Dulcissima in the 2003 exhibit in Rome to celebrate the 25th anniversary of the pontificate of Pope John Paul II. Between 2004 and 2006, Lamagna created the sculptures for the Dehumanitat exhibit at the European Parliament in Brussels. In 2007, he presented the exhibit Ora Nona at Palazzo Venezia in Rome. As of early 2009 he is “embedded” with a contingent of the Italian military as an art instructor to Afghan civilians in Herat, Afghanistan.
