= Accademia Daniel =

Israeli music ensemble

Accademia Daniel is a leading international music ensemble that specializes in performing music of the baroque era. The ensemble performed extensively in among all at such places as the Tel Aviv Museum of Art, the Haydn Festival in Eisenstadt, and the Bach Museum in Leipzig Prague Symphony, Radovlijca and Brezice festivals, Handel Haus, Goettingen festival, Bogota Banco de la Republica, Sociedad Philharmonica Lima, Santiago de Chile, São Paulo, Buenos Aires to name a few. The ensemble has also performed in concert with several notable musicians and ensembles including the Klaus Mertens, Simon Standage, Guy de Mey, Barbara Schlick, John Toll, Ryo Terakado,Rainer Zipperling, Carolyn Watkinson, and the Oslo Baroque Soloists among others. The Accademia Daniel has also produced numerous commercial recordings on the CPO and HR record labels.

== Sources ==
- Accademia Daniel discography at Discogs
- Bio at bach-cantatas.com
- https://shalevito.wixsite.com/shalevito
