= Accademia dei Risvegliati =

Italian fraternal organization

The Accademia dei Risvegliati was a brotherhood founded in Pistoia (Tuscany, in central Italy) during the seventeenth century by Felice Cancellieri and the noble Federigo Manni, who was the first prince.

The Accademia was founded in 1642. It was formed by members of the nobility of Pistoia and the meetings revolved around poetry and music. By 1694 the academy had built a real theater, which was managed by the Accademia dei Risvegliati until its extinction. The academy was closed in the last century and was replaced by the Teatro Regio, today Teatro Manzoni.
