= Accademia degli Svogliati =

- Formation: 5 November 1620
- Dissolved: c. 1648
- Type: learned society
- Location: Florence, Grand Duchy of Tuscany, Italy
- Founder: Jacopo Gaddi

The Accademia degli Svogliati ("Academy of the Will-less" or, erroneously, "Disgusted") was a 17th-century association of Italian men of letters in Florence. It began as a conversation on 5 November 1620 at the house of Jacopo Gaddi, where it continued to meet. It did not however acquire a name, an emblem or a statute until 22 January 1637. It flourished until about 1648. Gaddi was the driving force behind the Svogliati, as evidenced by the title of its statutes: "Statuti dell' Accademia degli Svogliati sotto il Principato dell'Illustrissimo Signore Jacopo Gaddi, suo Primo Principe e Promotore stabiliti".

The Svogliati were a well-educated lot: their marginalia contain learned references to the classics, mythology, and ancient history. Gaddi's palazzo, the "Paradiso Gaddi", now the Boscolo Hotel Astoria, and its gardens along the Via Melarancio was the principal meeting place of the members. The Villa Camerata, now a youth hostel, near Fiesole, and the chapel of Santa Maria Novella were other common meeting places. Membership in the Accademia was regulated by the statutes, which admitted only persons with virtù or scienza (knowledge), who were elected by the other members. Nationality, however, was incidental and the Accademia admitted as well as Italians speakers of English, French, and German. The English poet John Milton participated—and read his own work—at four meetings of the Accademia, on 16 and 17 September 1638, and on 24 and 31 March 1639; he may perhaps have attended earlier meetings, on 28 June and 8 July 1638. It is possible that he was even a member and in later writings he refers to the Gaddiana Academia (Gaddian Academy).
