= Accademia Italiana =

Private fine arts university in Italy

Coordinates: 43°45′58.1″N 11°15′00.0″E

- Type: Private
- Established: 1984
- President: Alessandro Colombo
- Students: 750
- Location: Rome, Florence, Italy
- Affiliations: University of Wales, Nottingham Trent University, Arcadia University, La Salle University, Rhode Island School of Design, Iowa State University
- Website: http://www.accademiaitaliana.com/en

Accademia Italiana is an international fine arts university with programs in fashion design, graphic design, interior and product design, communication design, jewelry design and photography and new media. It offers three-year bachelor's degree programs, professional certificates, master's degrees, short courses and study abroad programs for US university students.

== History and organization ==
Accademia Italiana was founded in Florence in 1984 and today has locations in Florence and Rome. Courses are taught in both Italian and English, according to the course of study.

== Legal recognition and accreditation ==
Accademia Italiana is authorized to offer bachelor's degree programs leading to degrees legally recognized by the Italian Ministry of Education (MIUR – D.M. n. 76 del 04/02/2013). The institute also offers bachelor's degrees accredited by prominent UK universities (BA Hons) and exchange programs with important universities in the US and throughout the world.
