= Gavin Williamson (disambiguation) =

Gavin Williamson (born 1976) is a British politician.

Gavin Williamson may also refer to:

- Gavin Williamson (harpsichordist) (1897–1989), American musician
- Gavin Williamson (kickboxer), a British finalist at the Men's Light-Contact at WAKO World Championships 2007 Belgrade -89 kg
