= List of symphonies by Christoph Graupner =

The following is a list of symphonies by Christoph Graupner (1683–1760), the German harpsichordist and composer of high Baroque music. The works appear as given in Thematishces Verzeichnis Der Musikalischen Werke:Graupner, Christoph (thematic catalogue of Graupner's instrumental works).

== List of symphonies ==
- GWV 501 — Symphony in C major for 2 horns, 2 violins, viola, basso. Darmstadt Library Shelf Number: 470/031
- GWV 502 — Symphony in C major for 2 horns, 2 violins, viola, basso. Darmstadt Library Shelf Number: 470/032
- GWV 503 — Symphony in C major for 2 horns, 2 violins, viola, basso. Darmstadt Library Shelf Number: 470/077
- GWV 504 — Symphony in C major for 2 horns, 2 violins, viola, basso. Darmstadt Library Shelf Number: 470/078
- GWV 505 — Symphony in C major for 2 horns, 2 violins, viola, basso. Darmstadt Library Shelf Number: 470/079
- GWV 506 — Symphony in C major for 2 horns, 2 violins, viola, basso. Darmstadt Library Shelf Number: 470/080
- GWV 507 — Symphony in C major for 2 horns, 2 violins, viola, basso. Darmstadt Library Shelf Number: 470/081
- GWV 508 — Symphony in C major for 2 horns, 2 violins, viola, basso. Darmstadt Library Shelf Number: 470/083
- GWV 509 — Symphony in C major for 2 horns, 2 violins, viola, basso. Darmstadt Library Shelf Number: 470/085
- GWV 510 — Symphony in C major for 2 flutes, 2 horns, 2 violins, viola, basso. Darmstadt Library Shelf Number: 470/043
- GWV 511 — Symphony in D major for 2 trumpets, 2 violins, viola, basso. Darmstadt Library Shelf Number: 470/048
- GWV 512 — Symphony in D major for 2 horns, 2 violins, viola, basso. Darmstadt Library Shelf Number: 470/021
- GWV 513 — Symphony in D major for 2 horns, 2 violins, viola, basso. Darmstadt Library Shelf Number: 470/023
- GWV 514 — Symphony in D major for 2 horns, 2 violins, viola, basso. Darmstadt Library Shelf Number: 470/033
- GWV 515 — Symphony in D major for 2 horns, 2 violins, viola, basso. Darmstadt Library Shelf Number: 470/061
- GWV 516 — Symphony in D major for 2 horns, 2 violins, viola, basso. Darmstadt Library Shelf Number: 470/063
- GWV 517 — Symphony in D major for 2 horns, 2 violins, viola, basso. Darmstadt Library Shelf Number: 470/076
- GWV 518 — Symphony in D major for 2 horns, 2 violins, viola, basso. Darmstadt Library Shelf Number: 470/082
- GWV 519 — Symphony in D major for 2 horns, 2 violins, viola, basso. Darmstadt Library Shelf Number: 470/086
- GWV 520 — Symphony in D major for 2 trumpets, 4 timpani, 2 violins, viola, basso. Darmstadt Library Shelf Number: 470/005
- GWV 521 — Symphony in D major for 2 trumpets, 2 timpani, 2 violins, viola, basso. Darmstadt Library Shelf Number: 470/010
- GWV 522 — Symphony in D major for 2 trumpets, 2 timpani, 2 violins, viola, basso. Darmstadt Library Shelf Number: 470/049
- GWV 523 — Symphony in D major for 2 trumpets, 4 timpani, 2 violins, viola, basso. Darmstadt Library Shelf Number: 470/050
- GWV 524 — Symphony in D major for 2 trumpets, 4 timpani, 2 violins, viola, basso. Darmstadt Library Shelf Number: 470/051
- GWV 525 — Symphony in D major for 2 trumpets, 2 timpani, 2 violins, viola, basso. Darmstadt Library Shelf Number: 470/055
- GWV 526 — Symphony in D major for 2 trumpets, 4 timpani, 2 violins, viola, basso. Darmstadt Library Shelf Number: 470/092
- GWV 527 — Symphony in D major for 2 trumpets, 4 timpani, 2 violins, viola, basso. Darmstadt Library Shelf Number: 470/093
- GWV 528 — Symphony in D major for 2 trumpets, 4 timpani, 2 violins, viola, basso. Darmstadt Library Shelf Number: 470/094
- GWV 529 — Symphony in D major for 2 trumpets, 4 timpani, 2 violins, viola, basso. Darmstadt Library Shelf Number: 470/095
- GWV 530 — Symphony in D major for 2 horns, 4 timpani, 2 violins, viola, basso. Darmstadt Library Shelf Number: 470/007
- GWV 531 — Symphony in D major for 2 horns, 2 timpani, 2 violins, viola, basso. Darmstadt Library Shelf Number: 470/022
- GWV 532 — Symphony in D major for 2 horns, 4 timpani, 2 violins, viola, basso. Darmstadt Library Shelf Number: 470/024
- GWV 533 — Symphony in D major for 2 horns, 4 timpani, 2 violins, viola, basso. Darmstadt Library Shelf Number: 470/034
- GWV 534 — Symphony in D major for 2 horns, 2 timpani, 2 violins, viola, basso. Darmstadt Library Shelf Number: 470/035
- GWV 535 — Symphony in D major for 2 flutes, 2 horns, 2 violins, viola, basso. Darmstadt Library Shelf Number: 470/040
- GWV 536 — Symphony in D major for 2 flutes, 2 horns, 2 violins, viola, basso. Darmstadt Library Shelf Number: 470/089
- GWV 537 — Symphony in D major for 2 flutes, 2 horns, 2 violins, viola, basso. Darmstadt Library Shelf Number: 470/107
- GWV 538 — Symphony in D major for 2 flutes, 2 horns, 2 violins, viola, basso. Darmstadt Library Shelf Number: 470/110
- GWV 539 — Symphony in D major for 2 flutes, 2 horns, 2 violins, viola, basso. Darmstadt Library Shelf Number: 470/111
- GWV 540 — Symphony in D major for 2 trumpets, 2 horns, 4 timpani, 2 violins, viola, basso. Darmstadt Library Shelf Number: 470/011
- GWV 541 — Symphony in D major for 2 trumpets, 2 horns, 4 timpani, 2 violins, viola, basso. Darmstadt Library Shelf Number: 470/012
- GWV 542 — Symphony in D major for 2 trumpets, 2 horns, 4 timpani, 2 violins, viola, basso. Darmstadt Library Shelf Number: 470/053
- GWV 543 — Symphony in D major for 2 trumpets, 2 horns, 4 timpani, 2 violins, viola, basso. Darmstadt Library Shelf Number: 470/054
- GWV 544 — Symphony in D major for 2 trumpets, 2 horns, 4 timpani, 2 violins, viola, basso. Darmstadt Library Shelf Number: 470/056
- GWV 545 — Symphony in D major for 2 trumpets, 2 flutes, 4 timpani, 2 violins, viola, basso. Darmstadt Library Shelf Number: 470/098
- GWV 546 — Symphony in D major for 2 flutes, 2 horns, 2 violins, viola, basso. Darmstadt Library Shelf Number: 470/045
- GWV 547 — Symphony in D major for 2 flutes, 2 horns, 4 timpani, 2 violins, viola, basso. Darmstadt Library Shelf Number: 470/044
- GWV 548 — Symphony in D major for 2 flutes, 2 horns, 4 timpani, 2 violins, viola, basso. Darmstadt Library Shelf Number: 470/047
- GWV 549 — Symphony in D major for 2 trumpets, 2 flutes, 2 horns, 4 timpani, 2 violins, viola, basso. Darmstadt Library Shelf Number: 470/052
- GWV 550 — Symphony in D major for 2 trumpets, 2 flutes, 2 horns, 4 timpani, 2 violins, viola, basso. Darmstadt Library Shelf Number: 470/067
- GWV 551 — Symphony in D major for 2 trumpets, 2 flutes, 2 horns, 4 timpani, 2 violins, viola, basso. Darmstadt Library Shelf Number: 470/068
- GWV 552 — Symphony in D major for 2 trumpets, 2 flutes, 2 horns, 4 timpani, 2 violins, viola, basso. Darmstadt Library Shelf Number: 470/069
- GWV 553 — Symphony in D major for 2 trumpets, 2 flutes, 2 horns, 4 timpani, 2 violins, viola, basso. Darmstadt Library Shelf Number: 470/070
- GWV 554 — Symphony in D major for 2 trumpets, 2 flutes, 2 horns, 4 timpani, 2 violins, viola, basso. Darmstadt Library Shelf Number: 470/097
- GWV 555 — Symphony in D major for 2 trumpets, 2 flutes, 2 horns, 4 timpani, 2 violins, viola, basso. Darmstadt Library Shelf Number: 470/113
- GWV 556 — Symphony in D major for 2 trumpets, 2 flutes, 2 horns, 4 timpani, 2 violins, viola, basso. Darmstadt Library Shelf Number: 470/096
- GWV 557 — Symphony in E♭ major for 2 horns, 2 violins, viola, basso. Darmstadt Library Shelf Number: 470/025
- GWV 558 — Symphony in E♭ major for 2 horns, 4 timpani, 2 violins, viola, basso. Darmstadt Library Shelf Number: 470/026
- GWV 559 — Symphony in E♭ major for 2 horns, 4 timpani, 2 violins, viola, basso. Darmstadt Library Shelf Number: 470/027
- GWV 560 — Symphony in E♭ major for 2 flutes, 2 horns, 2 violins, viola, basso. Darmstadt Library Shelf Number: 470/041
- GWV 561 — Symphony in E♭ major for 2 flutes, 2 horns, 2 violins, viola, basso. Darmstadt Library Shelf Number: 470/042
- GWV 562 — Symphony in E major for 2 flutes, 2 horns, 2 violins, viola, basso. Darmstadt Library Shelf Number: 470/088
- GWV 563 — Symphony in F major for 2 horns, 2 violins, viola, basso. Darmstadt Library Shelf Number: 470/028
- GWV 564 — Symphony in F major for 2 horns, 2 violins, viola, basso. Darmstadt Library Shelf Number: 470/029
- GWV 565 — Symphony in F major for 2 trumpets, 3 timpani, 2 violins, viola, basso. Darmstadt Library Shelf Number: 470/009
- GWV 566 — Symphony in F major for 2 horns, 6 timpani, 2 violins, viola, basso. Darmstadt Library Shelf Number: 470/008
- GWV 567 — Symphony in F major for 2 horns, 4 timpani, 2 violins, viola, basso. Darmstadt Library Shelf Number: 470/030
- GWV 568 — Symphony in F major for 2 flutes, 2 horns, 2 violins, viola, basso. Darmstadt Library Shelf Number: 470/064
- GWV 569 — Symphony in F major for 2 flutes, 2 horns, 2 violins, viola, basso. Darmstadt Library Shelf Number: 470/065
- GWV 570 — Symphony in F major for 2 flutes, 2 horns, 2 violins, viola, basso. Darmstadt Library Shelf Number: 470/066
- GWV 571 — Symphony in F major for 2 flutes, 2 horns, 2 violins, viola, basso. Darmstadt Library Shelf Number: 470/108
- GWV 572 — Symphony in F major for 2 flutes, 2 horns, 2 violins, viola, basso. Darmstadt Library Shelf Number: 470/109
- GWV 573 — Symphony in F major for 2 flutes, 2 horns, 2 violins, viola, basso. Darmstadt Library Shelf Number: 470/112
- GWV 574 — Symphony in F major for 2 horns, 2 violettas, 2 violins, viola, basso. Darmstadt Library Shelf Number: 470/101
- GWV 575 — Symphony in F major for 2 horns, 2 violettas, 2 violins, viola, basso. Darmstadt Library Shelf Number: 470/102
- GWV 576 — Symphony in F major for 2 flutes, 2 horns, 4 timpani, 2 violins, viola, basso. Darmstadt Library Shelf Number: 470/090
- GWV 577 — Symphony in F major for viola d'amore, bassoon, cello, 3 violas, basso. Darmstadt Library Shelf Number: 470/003
- GWV 578 — Symphony in G major for 2 horns, 2 violins, viola, basso. Darmstadt Library Shelf Number: 470/014
- GWV 579 — Symphony in G major for 2 horns, 2 violins, viola, basso. Darmstadt Library Shelf Number: 470/015
- GWV 580 — Symphony in G major for 2 horns, 2 violins, viola, basso. Darmstadt Library Shelf Number: 470/016
- GWV 581 — Symphony in G major for 2 horns, 2 violins, viola, basso. Darmstadt Library Shelf Number: 470/019
- GWV 582 — Symphony in G major for 2 horns, 2 violins, viola, basso. Darmstadt Library Shelf Number: 470/020
- GWV 583 — Symphony in G major for 2 horns, 2 violins, viola, basso. Darmstadt Library Shelf Number: 470/036
- GWV 584 — Symphony in G major for 2 horns, 2 violins, viola, basso. Darmstadt Library Shelf Number: 470/037
- GWV 585 — Symphony in G major for 2 horns, 2 violins, viola, basso. Darmstadt Library Shelf Number: 470/057
- GWV 586 — Symphony in G major for 2 horns, 2 violins, viola, basso. Darmstadt Library Shelf Number: 470/058
- GWV 587 — Symphony in G major for 2 horns, 2 violins, viola, basso. Darmstadt Library Shelf Number: 470/059
- GWV 588 — Symphony in G major for 2 horns, 2 violins, viola, basso. Darmstadt Library Shelf Number: 470/059
- GWV 589 — Symphony in G major for 2 horns, 2 violins, viola, basso. Darmstadt Library Shelf Number: 470/071
- GWV 590 — Symphony in G major for 2 horns, 2 violins, viola, basso. Darmstadt Library Shelf Number: 470/072
- GWV 591 — Symphony in G major for 2 horns, 2 violins, viola, basso. Darmstadt Library Shelf Number: 470/073
- GWV 592 — Symphony in G major for 2 horns, 2 violins, viola, basso. Darmstadt Library Shelf Number: 470/074
- GWV 593 — Symphony in G major for 2 horns, 2 violins, viola, basso. Darmstadt Library Shelf Number: 470/075
- GWV 594 — Symphony in G major for 2 horns, 2 violins, viola, basso. Darmstadt Library Shelf Number: 470/084
- GWV 595 — Symphony in G major for 2 horns, 2 violins, viola, basso. Darmstadt Library Shelf Number: 470/103
- GWV 596 — Symphony in G major for 2 horns, 2 timpani, 2 violins, viola, basso. Darmstadt Library Shelf Number: 470/001
- GWV 597 — Symphony in G major for 2 horns, 2 timpani, 2 violins, viola, basso. Darmstadt Library Shelf Number: 470/002
- GWV 598 — Symphony in G major for 2 horns, 4 timpani, 2 violins, viola, basso. Darmstadt Library Shelf Number: 470/006
- GWV 599 — Symphony in G major for 2 horns, 4 timpani, 2 violins, viola, basso. Darmstadt Library Shelf Number: 470/018
- GWV 600 — Symphony in G major for 2 flutes, 2 horns, 2 violins, viola, basso. Darmstadt Library Shelf Number: 470/038
- GWV 601 — Symphony in G major for 2 flutes, 2 horns, 2 violins, viola, basso. Darmstadt Library Shelf Number: 470/039
- GWV 602 — Symphony in G major for 2 flutes, 2 horns, 2 violins, viola, basso. Darmstadt Library Shelf Number: 470/046
- GWV 603 — Symphony in G major for 2 flutes, 2 horns, 2 violins, viola, basso. Darmstadt Library Shelf Number: 470/087
- GWV 604 — Symphony in G major for 2 flutes, 2 horns, 2 violins, viola, basso. Darmstadt Library Shelf Number: 470/091
- GWV 605 — Symphony in G major for 2 flutes, 2 horns, 2 violins, viola, basso. Darmstadt Library Shelf Number: 470/104
- GWV 606 — Symphony in G major for 2 flutes, 2 horns, 2 violins, viola, basso. Darmstadt Library Shelf Number: 470/105
- GWV 607 — Symphony in G major for 2 horns, 2 violettas, 2 violins, viola, basso. Darmstadt Library Shelf Number: 470/099
- GWV 608 — Symphony in G major for 2 horns, 2 violettas, 2 violins, viola, basso. Darmstadt Library Shelf Number: 470/100
- GWV 609 — Symphony in G major for 2 flutes, 2 horns, 4 timpani, 2 violins, viola, basso. Darmstadt Library Shelf Number: 470/106
- GWV 610 — Symphony in G major for 2 flutes, 2 horns, 4 timpani, 2 violins, viola, basso. Darmstadt Library Shelf Number: 470/004
- GWV 611 — Symphony in G major for 2 flutes, 2 horns, 2 bassoons, 5 timpani, 2 violettas, 2 violins, viola, basso. Darmstadt Library Shelf Number: 470/013
- GWV 612 — Symphony in A major for 2 horns, 2 timpani, 2 violins, viola, basso. Darmstadt Library Shelf Number: 470/017
- GWV 730 — Symphony in D major for 2 trumpets, 2 flutes, 2 horns, 2 violins, viola, basso. Darmstadt Library Shelf Number: 470/062

== See also ==
- List of cantatas by Christoph Graupner
- List of harpsichord pieces by Christoph Graupner
- List of orchestral suites by Christoph Graupner
- List of concertos by Christoph Graupner
- List of chamber pieces by Christoph Graupner

== Selected discography ==
- Graupner: Orchestral Works. Nova Stravaganza. Siegbert Rampe conductor (MD+G Gold 34111212)
- Graupner: Ouvertures and Cantata. Das Kliene Konzert. Hermann Max conductor. (CPO 999592)
- Graupner: Ouverture, Trio, Sinfonia. Nova Stravaganza. Siegbert Rampe conductor. (MD+G Gold 3411252)
