= List of chamber pieces by Christoph Graupner =

The following is a complete list of chamber music by Christoph Graupner (1683–1760), the German harpsichordist and composer of high Baroque music. The works appear as given in Christoph Graupner : Thematisches Verzeichnis der musikalischen Werke (thematic catalogue of Graupner's instrumental works).

== List of chamber pieces ==
Gwv 201 — Trio for bassoon, chalumeau & continuo in C major
Gwv 202 — Trio for flute, viola d'amore & continuo in C major
Gwv 203 — Trio for 2 violins & continuo in C minor
Gwv 204 — Trio for 2 violins & continuo in D major
Gwv 205 — Trio for flute, viola d'amore & continuo in D major
Gwv 206 — Sonata for 2 horns, violin, viola & continuo in D major
Gwv 207 — Trio for flute, viola d'amore & continuo in D minor
Gwv 208 — Trio for 2 violins & continuo in E major
Gwv 209 — Trio for flute, viola d'amore & continuo in E minor
Gwv 210 — Trio for viola d'amore, chalumeau & continuo in F major
Gwv 211 — Trio for 2 violins & continuo in F major
Gwv 212 — Sonata for 2 violins, viola & continuo in G major
Gwv 213 — Sonata for 2 horns, violin, viola & continuo in G major
Gwv 214 — Sonata for 2 horns, violin, viola & continuo in G major
Gwv 215 — Trio for 2 violins & continuo in G minor
Gwv 216 — Sonata for 2 recorders, viola da gamba & continuo in G minor
Gwv 217 — Trio for flute, viola d'amore & continuo in B♭ major
Gwv 218 — Sonata for 2 oboes, viola da gamba & continuo in B♭ major
Gwv 219 — Trio for flute, violin & continuo in B minor
Gwv 707 — Flute Sonata in G major
Gwv 708 — Violin Sonata in G major
Gwv 709 — Violin Sonata in G minor
Gwv 710 — Violin Sonata in G minor
Gwv 711 — Violin Sonata in G minor
Gwv 712 — Trio for 2 violins & continuo No. 1 in B♭ major
Gwv 713 — Trio for 2 violins & continuo No. 2 in G major
Gwv 714 — Trio for 2 violins & continuo No. 3 in D major
Gwv 715 — Trio for 2 violins & continuo No. 4 in A minor
Gwv 716 — Trio for 2 violins & continuo No. 5 in C minor
Gwv 717 — Trio for 2 violins & continuo No. 6 in A major
Gwv 718 — Trio for 2 violins & continuo No. 7 in D minor
Gwv 719 — Trio for 2 violins & continuo No. 8 in G minor
Gwv 720 — Trio for 2 violins & continuo No. 9 in F major
Gwv 721 — Trio for 2 violins & continuo No. 10 in C major
Gwv 722 — Trio for 2 violins & continuo No. 11 in B minor
Gwv 723 — Trio for 2 violins & continuo No. 12 in E minor
Gwv 724 — Sonata for 2 violins, viola & continuo in G minor

== See also ==
- List of cantatas by Christoph Graupner
- List of symphonies by Christoph Graupner
- List of harpsichord pieces by Christoph Graupner
- List of orchestral suites by Christoph Graupner
- List of concertos by Christoph Graupner

== Selected discography ==
- Die Kunst der Imitation. Works by Graupner, Fasch & Molter. Antichi Strumenti, ensemble. (Stradivarius 33632)
