= Christoph Graupner =

German Baroque composer (1683–1760)

- Born: 23 January [O.S. 13 January] 1683; Hartmannsdorf, Saxony
- Died: 25 June 1767 (aged 86); Darmstadt
- Education: Leipzig University
- Occupations: Composer; Music director
- Organizations: court of Ernest Louis, Landgrave of Hesse-Darmstadt
- Works: Church cantatas; Chamber music; Concertos; Harpsichord music; Orchestral suites; Symphonies

Signature
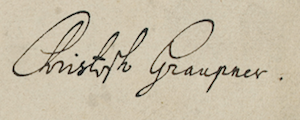

Christoph Graupner (23 January [O.S. 13 January] 1683 – 10 May 1760) was a German composer and harpsichordist of late Baroque music who was a contemporary of Johann Sebastian Bach, Georg Philipp Telemann and George Frideric Handel.

== Life ==
Born in Hartmannsdorf near Kirchberg in Saxony, Graupner received his first musical instruction from his uncle, an organist named Nicolaus Kuester. Graupner went to the University of Leipzig where he studied law (as did many composers of the time) and then completed his musical studies with Johann Kuhnau, the cantor of the Thomasschule (St. Thomas School).

In 1705, Graupner left Leipzig to play the harpsichord in the orchestra of the Oper am Gänsemarkt in Hamburg under the direction of Reinhard Keiser, alongside George Frideric Handel, then a young violinist. In addition to playing the harpsichord, Graupner composed six operas in Hamburg, some of them in collaboration with Keiser, a popular composer of operas in Germany.

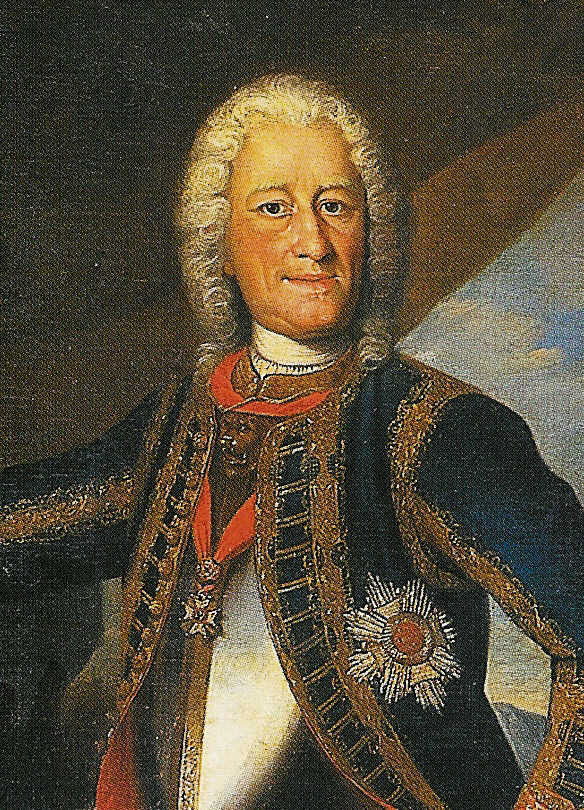
Christoph Graupner's patron: Landgraf Ernst Ludwig von Hessen-Darmstadt

In 1709, Graupner accepted a post at the court of Hesse-Darmstadt and in 1711 became the court orchestra's Hofkapellmeister (court chapel master). Graupner spent the rest of his career at the court in Hesse-Darmstadt, where his primary responsibilities were to provide music for the court chapel. He wrote music for nearly half a century, from 1709 to 1754, when he became blind. He died in Darmstadt six years later.

== Graupner and Bach ==
Graupner inadvertently played a key role in the history of music. Precarious finances in Darmstadt during the 1710s forced a reduction of musical life. The opera house was closed, and many court musicians' salaries were in arrears (including Graupner's). After many attempts to have his salary paid, and having several children and a wife to support, in late 1722 Graupner applied for the Cantorate in Leipzig. Telemann had been the first choice for this position, but withdrew after securing a salary increase in Hamburg. Graupner, under the guise of a family-related trip, travelled to Leipzig and presented there a Magnificat (GWV 1172/22, Graupner Werkverzeichnis) set in the style of his teacher, mentor and former holder of the Leipzig Cantorate, Kuhnau. On 17 January 1723 Graupner's audition, in which he presented the cantatas Aus der Tiefen rufen wir (GWV 1113/23a) and Lobet den Herrn alle Heiden (GWV 1113/23b), took place. His performance was sufficient to secure him the position and three days later the Leipzig council wrote to Graupner's patron (the Landgrave Ernst Ludwig of Hesse-Darmstadt) to request that he be released. However, Ernst Ludwig insisted on Graupner remaining in Darmstadt. In a subsequent settlement Graupner's past due salary was paid in full, his salary was increased; and he would be kept on staff even if his Kapelle was dismissed. With Graupner out of the running for the Cantorate in Leipzig, the next candidate to audition (on 7 February 1723), Johann Sebastian Bach, was awarded the position.

After hearing that Bach was the choice for Leipzig, on 4 May 1723 Graupner graciously wrote to the city council in Leipzig assuring them that Bach "is a musician just as strong on the organ as he is expert in church works and capelle pieces" and a man who "will honestly and properly perform the functions entrusted to him."

== Graupner's opus and modern editions ==
Graupner was hardworking and prolific. There are about 2,000 surviving works in his catalog, including 113 sinfonias, 85 ouvertures (suites), 44 concertos, 8 operas, 1,418 religious and 24 secular cantatas, 66 sonatas and 57 harpsichord partitas. Nearly all of Graupner's manuscripts are housed in the University and State Library Darmstadt.

Graupner wrote for exotic combinations of instruments, including the oboe d'amore, flute d'amore, and viola d'amore. Over half of his sinfonias require brass and timpani, with about 25 sinfonias requiring 3 to 4 timpani, one (sinfonia in G Major GWV 611) 5 timpani, and another, sinfonia in F Major (GWV 566), was composed for 6 timpani. A particular speciality for Graupner was the accompanied chorale. His immense sense of originality and creativity led to him composing a large number of highly contrasting chorales using a relatively small number of tunes. Indeed, one quarter of the 1312 chorales he composed within his 1356 cantatas for Sundays and feast days of the liturgical calendar are based on just 6 tunes.

== Obscurity ==
After he died, Graupner's works fell into obscurity for a number of reasons. His manuscripts became the object of a long legal battle between his heirs and the rulers of Hesse-Darmstadt. A final court decision denied the Graupner estate ownership of the music manuscripts. The heirs were unable to obtain permission to sell or publish his works and they remained inaccessible to the public. Furthermore, subsequent dramatic changes in music styles had reduced the interest in Graupner's music. On the positive side however, the Landgrave's seizure of Graupner's musical estate ensured its survival in toto. Fate was not so kind to J. S. Bach's musical legacy, for example. Another factor that contributed to Graupner's posthumous obscurity was that, unlike Bach, Graupner had very few pupils other than Johann Friedrich Fasch to carry on his musical legacy.

As critic David Vernier has summed up, Graupner is "one of those unfortunate victims of fate and circumstance – a contemporary of Bach, Handel, Telemann, etc., who has remained largely – and unfairly – neglected."

== Rediscovery ==
"Gute Nacht, o Wesen / Weicht, ihr Trauergeister"
From Graupner's cantata Meine Seufzer, meine Klagen (GWV 1154/09b)

"Trotz dem alten Drachen"
From Graupner's cantata Wer unter dem Schirm des Höchsten (GWV 1120/51)

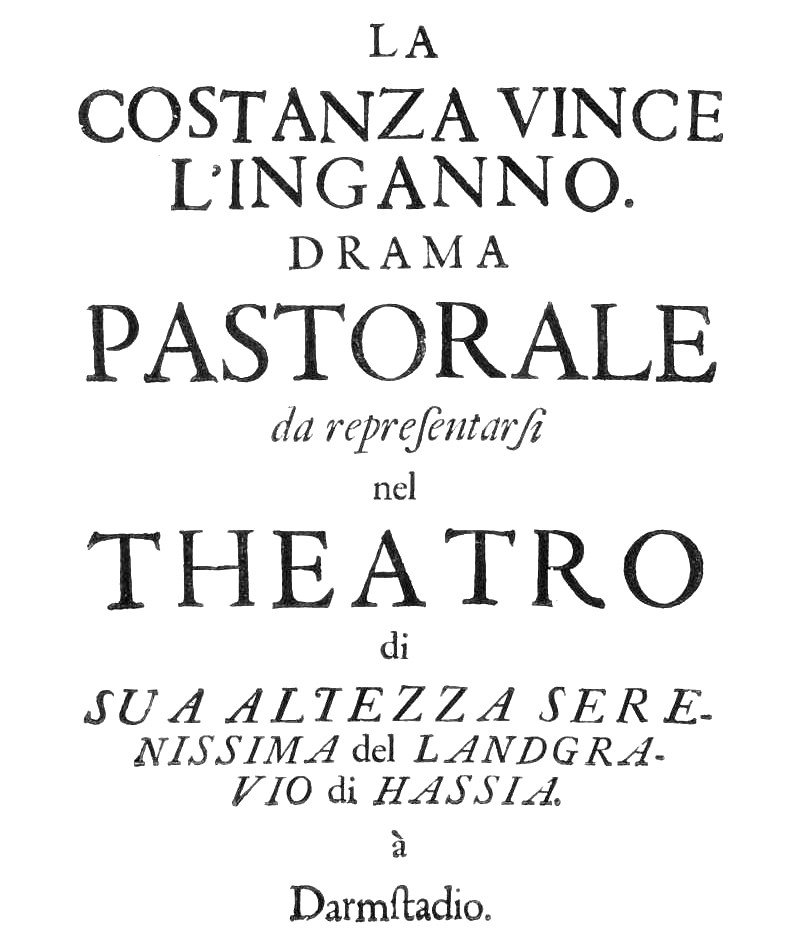
Title page of the libretto for an opera

Graupner's music is enjoying a revival, due in large part to the research efforts of many musicologists, performers, and conductors.

Beginning in the early 20th century, research began with Willibald Nagel's study of Graupner's sinfonias. In the 1920s, Friedrich Noack published his research on Graupner's cantatas. Baerenreiter published several sinfonias and an ouverture in the 1950s. In the early 1980s, Myron Rosenblum edited four sinfonias for the massive Barry Brook project The Symphony, 1720-1840: A Comprehensive Collection of Full Scores (New York: Garland, 1979–85), 60 vols. The year 1988 saw the publication of Oswald Bill's study of Graupner, with several articles by such Graupner experts as Peter Cahn (on the sinfonias), Joanna Cobb Biermann (musicians and salaries in Darmstadt), as well as source documents on court life in Darmstadt. Three dissertations were very important for Graupner research: H. Cutler Fall's study of the Passiontide cantatas, Rene Schmidt's study of the Christmas cantatas, and Vernon Wicker's study of solo bass cantatas. Christoph Grosspietsch published an extensive study of Graupner's ouvertures in 1994.

Despite all this research, there were relatively few recordings available to the general public. This changed in 1998, when Hermann Max conducted a CD of Graupner works on the CPO label. Montreal harpsichordist Geneviève Soly came across a Graupner manuscript in the Beinecke Library at Yale University in the year 2000 and started performing and recording his works. Graupner was "always on the cutting edge for his time and very innovative in his ideas for harmony, notation, and the use of instruments," as Soly has noted. "You have to take into consideration his various styles in relation to the actual period and the ideas he was interested in developing at that moment. The size of the catalogue imposes added difficulties in this respect, because another composer might have written for just as long, but in one style only. Mozart comes to mind: although he composed over a shorter period, his style was always well defined."

In April 2005, a thematic catalog of Graupner's instrumental music (Oswald Bill and Christoph Grosspietsch, editors) was published by Carus-Verlag. There are plans to catalog Graupner's vocal music. In 2010, Belgian conductor and musicologist Florian Heyerick published an online and searchable digital GWV of the instrumental and vocal works.

In 2021 Brilliant Classics issued a 14-CD set of Graupner's complete harpsichord music, performed by Fernando De Luca.

The first complete recording of Christoph Graupner's six surviving solo tenor church cantatas will be released in 2026 under the title Ein Freudenlicht bestrahlt mich – Complete Cantatas for Tenor. Performed by tenor Georg Poplutz with L'arpa festante conducted by Florian Heyerick, the two-CD album presents the world premiere recording of all six works, composed between 1725 and 1747 for the liturgical occasions of Estomihi, the Third Day of Christmas, the Third Day of Pentecost, and the Seventh Sunday after Trinity. The recording highlights a rare aspect of Graupner's sacred output, as solo tenor cantatas constitute only six works among his nearly 1,450 surviving church cantatas.

== Family ==
Christoph Graupner married Sophie Elisabeth Eckard (1693–1742), daughter of pastor Johann Peter Eckard (1659–1702). They had seven children:

- Maria Elisabetha Graupner (b. 1713), married Chamber Secretary Johann Georg Wachter, among her children was Marie Louise Wachter (1756–1820), who married War Council member Johann Lorenz Köhler (1744–1804).
- Christoph Graupner Jr. (1715–1760), Chancery-Clerk, Hesse-Darmstadt.
- Johann Christoph Graupner (1719–1771), Hessen-Darmstädtischer Kammerrat and Clerk in Zwingenberg.
- Georg Christoph Graupner (b. 1722), Hofjäger.
- Ludwig Christoph Graupner (1725–1797)
- Heinrich Christoph Graupner (b. 1728)
- Christoph Gottlieb Graupner (1732–1806), Oberbereiter at the Marstall in Darmstadt.

His sister-in-law Katharina Henriette Eckard (1696–1764), married pastor Johann Conrad Lichtenberg (1689–1751) and was a mother of physicist, satirist, and Anglophile Georg Christoph Lichtenberg (1742–1799).

== Works ==
- List of church cantatas by Christoph Graupner
- List of chamber pieces by Christoph Graupner
- List of concertos by Christoph Graupner
- List of harpsichord pieces by Christoph Graupner
- List of orchestral suites by Christoph Graupner
- List of symphonies by Christoph Graupner

=== Operas ===
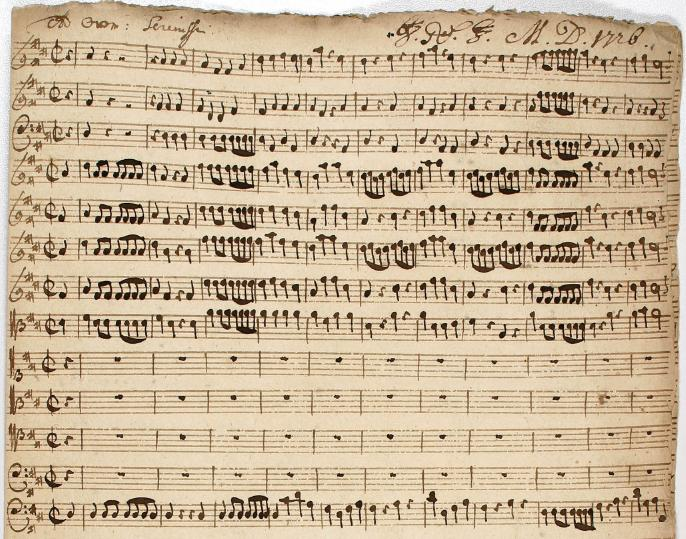
Christoph Graupner's cantata for the birthday of Landgraf Ernst Ludwig, December 1726

- Dido, Königin von Carthago (singspiel, 1707)
- Il fido amico, oder Der getreue Freund Hercules und Theseus (1708)
- L'amore ammalato, Die kränkende Liebe, oder Antiochus und Stratonica (1708)
- Bellerophon (1708)
- Der Fall des grossen Richters in Israel (1709)
- unnamed opera (1709)
- Berenice und Lucilla (1710)
- Telemach (1711)
- La costanza vince l'inganno (1715)
- Adone (1719)

== Selected discography ==
=== Instrumental music ===
- Graupner: Cantate, Sonate, Ouverture. Performed by Hélène Plouffe, Geneviève Soly, Chantal Rémillard, Isabelle Bozzini, Ingrid Schmithüsen and L'Ensemble des Idées Heureuses conducted by Geneviève Soly (Analekta 23180)
- Graupner: Chalumeaux - Concertos, Ouvertures & Sonatas. Ars Antiqua Austria, Gunar Letzbor; Performed on historically reproduced instruments. (Challenge Classics CC72539).
- Graupner: Concertos for viola d'amore. viola d'amore and viola and viola d'amore and flute. Performed by Donald Maurice, Marcin Murawksi and Ewa Murawska with Orchestra Ars Longa conducted by Eugeniusz Dabrowkski. DVD and on line. Arte Prealable. APV002 Poland
- Graupner: Orchestral Works Vol. 1, Nova Stravaganza, Siegbert Rampe, MDG 341 1121-2
- Graupner: Orchestral Works Vol. 2, Nova Stravaganza, Siegbert Rampe, MDG 341 1252-2
- Graupner: Orchestral Works Vol. 2, Nova Stravaganza, Siegbert Rampe, MDG 341 1628-2
- Graupner: Ouvertures GWV 420 & 421. Antichi Strumenti (Stradivarius 3661472)
- Graupner: Partitas For Harpsichord, Vol 1–6. Performed by Geneviève Soly (Analekta 23109, 23164 23181, 29116, 29118, 29119)
- Various: Virtuoso Timpani Concertos. Dresden Philharmonic Chamber Orchestra. Alexander Peter conductor. (Naxos 8557610)

=== Mixed programs ===
- Graupner: Instrumental And Vocal Music. Performed by Ingrid Schmithüsen, Mathieu Lussier, Hélène Plouffe, Geneviève Soly and L'Ensemble des Idées Heureuses conducted by Geneviève Soly (Analekta 23162)
- Graupner: Ouvertures and cantata. Das kleine Konzert. Hermann Max conductor. (CPO 999592)

=== Vocal music ===
==== Cantatas ====
- Graupner: Complete Cantatas for Tenor, Georg Poplutz, L'arpa festante, Florian Heyerick, MDG 602 2403-2, www.mdg.de
- Graupner: Christmas cantatas. Das Kleine Konzert, Hermann Max CPO
- Graupner: Ein Weihnachtsoratorium, 9 Christmas Cantatas (2 CD, Ricercar 307, 2010), Florian Heyerick, Ex Tempore, Mannheimer Hofkapelle
- Graupner: Epiphany Cantatas Was Gott thut, das ist wohl gethan, er ist mein Licht, GWV 1114/43; Erwacht, ihr Heyden, GWV 1111/34; Die Waßer Wogen im Meer sind groß, GWV 1115/35; Was Gott thut, das ist wohl gethan, es bleibt gerecht sein Wille, GWV 1114/30; Gott, der Herr, ist Sonne und Schild, GWV 1114/54. Andrea Lauren Brown (soprano), Kai Wessel (countertenor), Georg Poplutz (tenor), Dominik Wörner (bass), Kirchheimer BachConsort, Sirkka-Liisa Kaakinen-Pilch (conductor) (CPO 555 146–2, 2017).
- Graupner: Passion cantatas. "Wo gehet Jesus hin" Anton-Webern-Chor Freiburg, Ensemble Concerto grosso, Hans Michael Beuerle. Carus Verlag.
- Graupner: Solo- und Dialog Cantatas Jesus ist und bleibt mein Leben GWV 1107/12; Gott ist für uns gestorben GWV 1152/16; Siehe, selig ist der Mensch, den Gott strafet GWV 1162/09; Diese Zeit ist ein Spiel der Eitelkeit GWV 1165/09; Süßes Ende aller Schmerzen GWV 1166/20 . Mit Marie-Luise Werneburg (soprano), Dominik Wörner (bass), Kirchheimer BachConsort, Rudolf Lutz (conductor). (CPO 555-215-2, 2018).
- Various: Bach and his rivals. The Bach Players (dir. Nicolette Moonen). Hyphen Press Music 008.

==== Operas ====
- Graupner: Antiochus und Stratonica. Christian Immler (Antiochus), Hana Blažíková (Stratonica), Harry van der Kamp (Seleucus), Sunhae Im (Mirtenia), Sherezade Panthaki (Ellenia), Aaron Sheehan (Demetrius), Jesse Blumberg (Hesychius/Ober-Priester), Jan Kobow (Negrodorus). Boston Early Music Festival Orchestra, Paul O'Dette and Stephen Stubbs, directors (CPO 555369–2, released 2021).
