= List of concertos by Christoph Graupner =

The following is a complete list of concertos by Christoph Graupner (1683–1760), the German harpsichordist and composer of high Baroque music. The works appear as given in Christoph Graupner : Thematisches Verzeichnis der Musikalischen Werke (thematic catalogue of Graupner's instrumental works).

== List of concertos ==
- GWV 301 — Bassoon Concerto in C major
- GWV 302 — Concerto for oboe d'amore in C major
- GWV 303 — Concerto for 2 chalumeaux in C major
- GWV 304 — Concerto for 2 violins in C major
- GWV 305 — Concerto for 2 flutes in C major
- GWV 306 — Concerto for chalumeau, bassoon and cello in C major
- GWV 307 — Bassoon Concerto in C minor
- GWV 308 — Trumpet Concerto in D major
- GWV 309 — Trumpet Concerto in D major
- GWV 310 — Flute Concerto in D major
- GWV 311 — Flute Concerto in D major
- GWV 312 — Flute Concerto in D major
- GWV 313 — Concerto for oboe d'amore in D major
- GWV 314 — Concerto for viola d'amore in D major
- GWV 315 — Concerto for 2 flutes in D major
- GWV 316 — Concerto for 2 flutes in D major
- GWV 317 — Concerto for viola d'amore & viola in D major
- GWV 318 — Concerto for 2 trumpets in D major
- GWV 319 — Concerto for 2 violins in E♭ major
- GWV 320 — Flute Concerto in E major
- GWV 321 — Concerto for 2 flutes in E minor
- GWV 322 — Concerto for 2 flutes in E minor
- GWV 323 — Recorder Concerto in F major
- GWV 324 — Oboe Concerto in F major
- GWV 325 — Concerto for 2 chalumeaux in F major
- GWV 326 — Concerto for 2 oboes di selva in F major
- GWV 327 — Concerto for chalumeau, flute & viola d'amore in F major
- GWV 328 — Bassoon Concerto in G major
- GWV 329 — Flute Concerto in G major
- GWV 330 — Concerto for 2 flutes in G major
- GWV 331 — Concerto for 2 flutes in G major
- GWV 332 — Concerto for 2 horns in G major
- GWV 333 — Concerto for flauto d'amore, oboe d'amore & viola d'amore in G major
- GWV 334 — Concerto for 2 violins in G minor
- GWV 335 — Concerto for 2 violins in G minor
- GWV 336 — Concerto for viola d'amore in G minor
- GWV 337 — Violin Concerto in A major
- GWV 338 — Concerto for 2 violins in A major
- GWV 339 — Concerto for viola d'amore & viola in A major
- GWV 340 — Bassoon Concerto in B♭ major
- GWV 341 — Concerto for 2 oboes in B♭ major
- GWV 342 — Concerto for 2 oboes in B♭ major
- GWV 343 — Concerto for chalumeau, oboe & viola d'amore in B♭ major
- GWV 344 — Concerto for 2 flutes & 2 oboes in B♭ major
- GWV 725 — Concerto for flute & viola d'amore in D minor
- GWV 726 — Concerto for viola d'amore in G major
- GWV 727 — Flute Concerto in A major
- GWV 728 — Concerto for flauto d'amore in A major

== See also ==
- List of cantatas by Christoph Graupner
- List of symphonies by Christoph Graupner
- List of harpsichord pieces by Christoph Graupner
- List of orchestral suites by Christoph Graupner
- List of chamber pieces by Christoph Graupner

== Selected discography ==
- Graupner: Ritratti a colori (Concertos). Antichi Strumenti, orchestra. (Stradivarius 33581)
- Graupner: Instrumental and vocal music Vol. 1. Les idées heureuses, orchestra. (Analekta 3162)
- Graupner: Instrumental and vocal music Vol. 2. Les idées heureuses, orchestra. (Analekta 3180)
- Graupner: Instrumental and vocal music Vol. 3. Les idées heureuses, orchestra. (Analekta 9115)
