= List of orchestral suites by Christoph Graupner =

The following is a complete list of orchestral suites by Christoph Graupner (1683–1760), the German harpsichordist and composer of high Baroque music. The works appear as given in Christoph Graupner : Thematisches Verzeichnis der Musikalischen Werke (thematic catalogue of Graupner's instrumental works). Apart from the string orchestra composed of 2 violins, viola and basso continuo, the additional instruments mentioned in the title of the work often play solo and ripieno parts.

== List of orchestral suites ==
- GWV 401 — Suite for 3 chalumeaux solo in C major
- GWV 402 — Suite for strings in C major
- GWV 403 — Suite for strings in C major
- GWV 404 — Suite for strings in C major
- GWV 405 — Suite for strings in C major
- GWV 406 — Suite for strings in C major
- GWV 407 — Suite for chalumeau & bassoon in C major
- GWV 408 — Suite for 2 oboes in C major
- GWV 409 — Suite for 3 chalumeaux in C major
- GWV 410 — Suite for 2 trumpets in C major
- GWV 411 — Suite for strings in C minor
- GWV 412 — Suite for strings in C minor
- GWV 413 — Suite for strings in C minor
- GWV 414 — Suite for strings in D major
- GWV 415 — Suite for strings in D major
- GWV 416 — Suite for strings in D major
- GWV 417 — Entrata per la Musica di Tavola for 2 flutes in D major
- GWV 418 — Suite for 2 flutes in D major
- GWV 419 — Suite for oboe d'amore & viola d'amore in D major
- GWV 420 — Suite for 2 trumpets in D major
- GWV 421 — Suite for 2 trumpets in D major
- GWV 422 — Suite for 2 trumpets in D major
- GWV 423 — Suite for 2 trumpets in D major
- GWV 424 — Overture in D major
- GWV 425 — Suite for strings in D minor
- GWV 426 — Suite for viola d'amore in D minor
- GWV 427 — Suite for viola d'amore in D minor
- GWV 428 — Suite for 3 chalumeaux in D minor
- GWV 429 — Suite for strings in E♭ major
- GWV 430 — Suite for 2 oboes in E♭ major
- GWV 431 — Suite for 2 flutes & 2 oboes in E♭ major
- GWV 432 — Suite for strings in E major
- GWV 433 — Suite for strings in E major
- GWV 434 — Suite for strings in E major
- GWV 435 — Suite for flauto d'amore in E major
- GWV 436 — Suite for flute in E major
- GWV 437 — Suite for oboe d'amore in E major
- GWV 438 — Suite for viola d'amore in E major
- GWV 439 — Suite for 2 oboes d'amore in E major
- GWV 440 — Suite for flauto d'amore & oboe d'amore in E major
- GWV 441 — Suite for strings in E minor
- GWV 442 — Suite for 2 oboes di selva in E minor
- GWV 443 — Suite for 3 chalumeaux solo in F major
- GWV 444 — Entrata per la Musica di Tavola for strings in F major
- GWV 445 — Suite for strings in F major
- GWV 446 — Suite for strings in F major
- GWV 447 — Suite for recorder in F major
- GWV 448 — Suite for 2 chalumeaux in F major
- GWV 449 — Suite for 3 chalumeaux in F major
- GWV 450 — Suite for flute, viola d'amore & chalumeau in F major
- GWV 451 — Suite for flute, viola d'amore, 2 chalumeaux & horn in F major
- GWV 452 — Suite for 2 chalumeaux & 2 horns in F major
- GWV 453 — Entrata per la Musica di Tavola for strings in G major
- GWV 454 — Suite for strings in G major
- GWV 455 — Suite for strings in G major
- GWV 456 — Suite for strings in G major
- GWV 457 — Suite for strings in G major
- GWV 458 — Suite for viola d'amore in G major
- GWV 459 — Suite for viola d'amore in G major
- GWV 460 — Suite for viola d'amore in G major
- GWV 461 — Suite for viola d'amore in G major
- GWV 462 — Suite for 2 flutes in G major
- GWV 463 — Suite for flauto d'amore & oboe d'amore in G major
- GWV 464 — Suite for flute & bassoon in G major
- GWV 465 — Suite for viola d'amore in G major
- GWV 466 — Suite for 2 hunting horns in G major
- GWV 467 — Suite for 2 flutes & 2 horns in G major
- GWV 468 — Entrata per la Musica di Tavola for strings in G minor
- GWV 469 — Suite for strings in G minor
- GWV 470 — Suite for 2 flutes in G minor
- GWV 471 — Suite for 2 flutes & 2 oboes in G minor
- GWV 472 — Entrata per la Musica di Tavola for strings in A major
- GWV 473 — Suite for strings in A major
- GWV 474 — Suite for strings in A major
- GWV 475 — Suite for strings in A major
- GWV 476 — Suite for viola d'amore in A major
- GWV 477 — Suite for flauto d'amore, oboe d'amore & viola d'amore in A major
- GWV 478 — Suite for flute in A minor
- GWV 479 — Suite for strings in B♭ major
- GWV 480 — Suite for strings in B♭ major
- GWV 481 — Suite for strings in B♭ major
- GWV 482 — Suite for strings in B♭ major
- GWV 483 — Suite for strings in B♭ major
- GWV 484 — Suite for chalumeau in B♭ major
- GWV 485 — Suite for flute in B♭ major
- GWV 729 — Suite for viola d'amore in A major

== See also ==
- List of cantatas by Christoph Graupner
- List of symphonies by Christoph Graupner
- List of harpsichord pieces by Christoph Graupner
- List of concertos by Christoph Graupner
- List of chamber pieces by Christoph Graupner

== Selected discography ==
- Graupner: Suites for chalumeaux. Mensa Sonora, orchestra. Jean Maillet, conductor. (Pierre Verany label 794114)
- Graupner: Music for chalumeau. Graupner Ensemble. (Vox Temporis 92009)
