= Antiochus und Stratonica =

Antiochus und Stratonica also titled L’amore ammalato, is a 1708 opera by Christoph Graupner for Hamburg's Oper am Gänsemarkt to a mixed German-Italian libretto by Barthold Feind; recitative's are in German and arias are sung in German and Italian, with French-style entrées.

== Cast ==
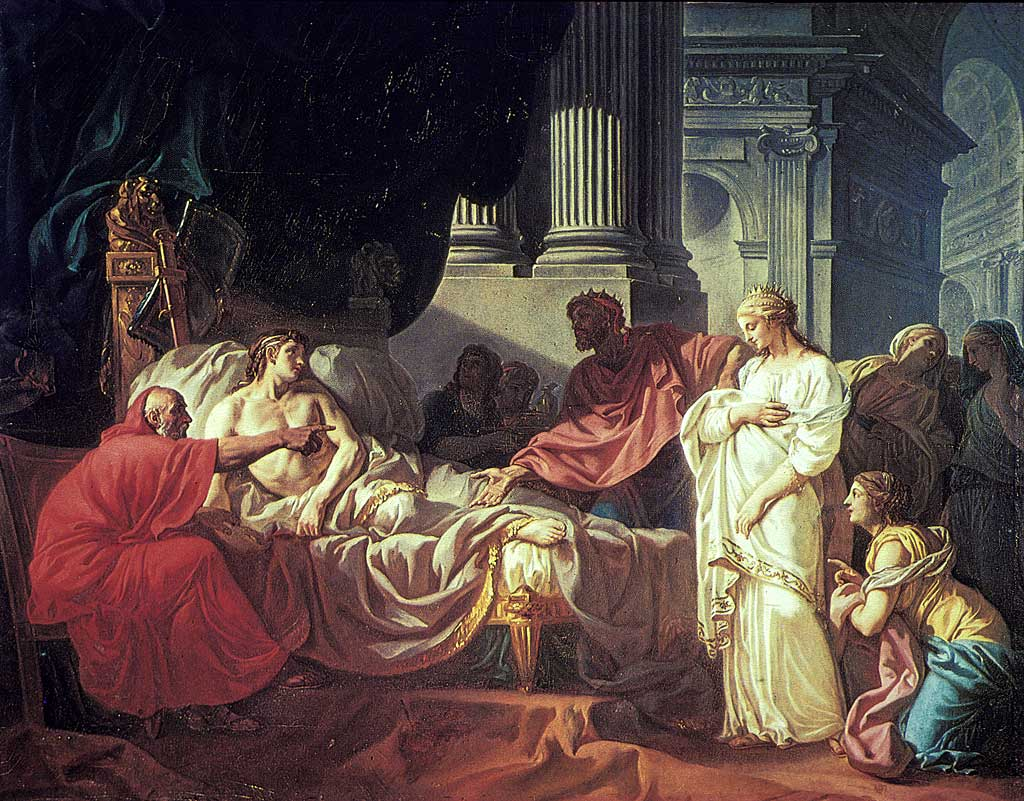
Erasistratus Discovering the Cause of Antiochus' Disease (1774, Jacques-Louis David)

- Demetrius, tenor
- Antiochus, baritone
- Stratonica, soprano
- Seleucus, bass
- Negrodorus, tenor
- Hesychius / Erasistratus, priest superior / royal physician, baritone
- Flavia, soprano
- Medor, soprano
- Ellenia, soprano
- Mirtenia, soprano

== Recording ==
Antiochus und Stratonica, Boston Early Music Festival Orchestra, Capella Ansgarii, Robert Mealy, conductor, CPO 3CD

== See also ==
- Erasistratus Discovering the Cause of Antiochus' Disease
