= List of harpsichord pieces by Christoph Graupner =

This article presents a complete list of harpsichord pieces by Christoph Graupner (1683–1760), a German composer and harpsichordist of the High Baroque. The ordering and titles follow Christoph Graupner: Thematisches Verzeichnis der musikalischen Werke (the thematic catalogue of Graupner’s instrumental works).[1]

== List of harpsichord pieces ==
- GWV 101 — Partita in C major
- GWV 102 — Partita in C minor
- GWV 103 — Partita in D major
- GWV 104 — Partita in D minor
- GWV 105 — Partita in E♭ major
- GWV 106 — Partita in E major
- GWV 107 — Partita in E minor
- GWV 108 — Partita in F major
- GWV 109 — Partita in C major "Januarius"
- GWV 110 — Partita in G major "Februarius"
- GWV 111 — Partita in G minor "Martius"
- GWV 112 — Partita in C minor "Aprilis"
- GWV 113 — Partita in F major "Maius"
- GWV 114 — Partita in F minor "Junius"
- GWV 115 — Partita in D major "Julius"
- GWV 116 — Partita in D minor "Augustus"
- GWV 117 — Partita in A major "September"
- GWV 118 — Partita in A minor "October"
- GWV 119 — Partita in E major "November"
- GWV 120 — Partita in E minor "December"
- GWV 121 — Partita in F minor "Vom Winter"
- GWV 122 — Partita for harpsichord "Vom Frühling" (lost)
- GWV 123 — Partita for harpsichord "Vom Sommer" (lost)
- GWV 124 — Partita for harpsichord "Vom Herbst" (lost)
- GWV 125 — Gigue in C major
- GWV 126 — Partita in C major
- GWV 127 — Partita in C major
- GWV 128 — Partita in C major
- GWV 129 — Partita in C major
- GWV 130 — Partita in C major
- GWV 131 — Partita in C minor
- GWV 132 — Partita in C minor
- GWV 133 — Partita in C minor
- GWV 134 — Partita in D major
- GWV 135 — Sonatina in D major
- GWV 136 — Aria in E♭ major
- GWV 137 — Partita in E minor
- GWV 138 — Gigue in F major
- GWV 139 — Murky in F major
- GWV 140 — Partita in F major
- GWV 141 — Partita in G major
- GWV 142 — Partita in G major
- GWV 143 — Partita in G major
- GWV 144 — Partita in G major
- GWV 145 — Partita in G major
- GWV 146 — Partita in G major
- GWV 147 — Partita in A major
- GWV 148 — Partita in A major
- GWV 149 — Partita in A major
- GWV 150 — Partita in A minor
- GWV 701 — Partita in D major
- GWV 702 — Partita in D minor
- GWV 703 — Menuet in F minor
- GWV 704 — Partita in G major (fragment)
- GWV 705 — Partita in A minor (fragment)
- GWV 706 — Harpsichord Sonata in B♭ major
- GWV 801 — Air in C major
- GWV 802 — Marche du Régiment de Saxe Gotha in C major
- GWV 803 — Menuet in C major
- GWV 804 — Partita in C major
- GWV 805 — Partita in C major
- GWV 806 — Gigue in C minor
- GWV 807 — Menuet in C minor
- GWV 808 — Sarabande in C minor
- GWV 809 — Sonatina in C minor
- GWV 810 — Aria in D major
- GWV 811 — Menuet in D major
- GWV 812 — Menuet in D major
- GWV 813 — Menuet in D major
- GWV 814 — Menuet in D major
- GWV 815 — Menuet in D major
- GWV 816 — Menuet in D major
- GWV 817 — Menuet in D major
- GWV 818 — Menuet in D major
- GWV 819 — Partita in D major
- GWV 820 — Aria in D minor
- GWV 821 — Aria in D minor
- GWV 822 — Aria in D minor
- GWV 823 — Menuet in D minor
- GWV 824 — Partita in D minor
- GWV 825 — Passepied in D minor
- GWV 826 — Prelude & Fugue in D minor
- GWV 827 — Bourrée in E minor
- GWV 828 — Menuet in E minor
- GWV 829 — Partita in E minor
- GWV 830 — Badinage in F major
- GWV 831 — Bourrée in F major
- GWV 832 — Entrée in F major
- GWV 833 — Menuet in F major
- GWV 834 — Menuet in F major
- GWV 835 — Partita in F major
- GWV 836 — Polonoise in F major
- GWV 837 — Polonoise in F major
- GWV 838 — Marche in G major
- GWV 839 — Menuet in G major
- GWV 840 — Menuet in G major
- GWV 841 — Menuet in G major
- GWV 842 — Reveille in G major
- GWV 843 — Piece in G major
- GWV 844 — Piece in G major
- GWV 845 — Piece in G major
- GWV 846 — Menuet in A major
- GWV 847 — Menuet in A major
- GWV 848 — Murky in A major
- GWV 849 — Partita in A major
- GWV 850 — Partita in A major
- GWV 851 — Partita in A major
- GWV 852 — Gigue in A minor
- GWV 853 — Menuet in A minor
- GWV 854 — Menuet in A minor
- GWV 855 — Prelude & Fugue in A minor
- GWV 856 — Bourrée in B♭ major
- GWV 857 — Partita in B♭ major

== See also ==
- List of cantatas by Christoph Graupner
- List of symphonies by Christoph Graupner
- List of orchestral suites by Christoph Graupner
- List of concertos by Christoph Graupner
- List of chamber pieces by Christoph Graupner

== Selected discography ==
- Graupner: Partitas for harpsichord Vol. 1. Geneviève Soly. (Analekta 3109)
- Graupner: Partitas for harpsichord Vol. 2. Geneviève Soly. (Analekta 3164)
- Graupner: Partitas for harpsichord Vol. 3. Geneviève Soly. (Analekta 3181)
- Graupner: Partitas for harpsichord Vol. 4. Geneviève Soly. (Analekta 9116)
- Graupner: Partitas for harpsichord Vol. 5. Geneviève Soly. (Analekta 9118)
- Graupner: Partitas for harpsichord Vol. 6. Geneviève Soly. (Analekta 9119)
- Graupner: Partitas for harpsichord Vol. 7. Geneviève Soly. (Analekta 9120)
- Graupner: Complete Harpsichord Music. Fernando de Luca. (Brilliant 96131 – 14 CDs)
