= James Henry Fields =

American pianist

James Henry Fields (born c. November 1, 1948 – c. November 15, 1984) was an American pianist.

== Life and career ==
Fields was born in Los Angeles. He was a protégé of Rudolf Serkin and studied with Ethel Leginska. His life and ability were often paralleled to that of Wolfgang Amadeus Mozart. Fields made his orchestral debut when he was ten years old and went on to solo extensively with almost every major orchestra in North and South America and Europe. He died at his sister's home in Shadow Hills, Los Angeles.
