= Ethel Leginska =

British pianist, conductor and composer

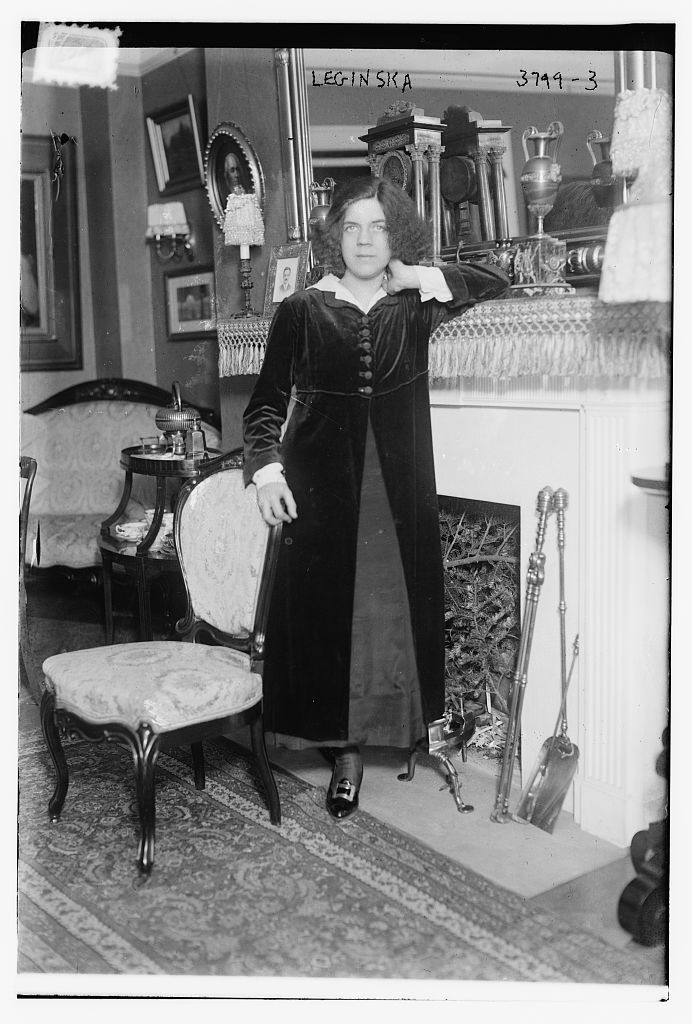
Ethel Leginska at her fireplace in 1916

Ethel Leginska (13 April 1886 – 26 February 1970), born Ethel Liggins, was a British pianist, conductor and composer. A student of Theodor Leschetizky, she became widely known as the ‘Paderewski of woman pianists’ and (from 1923) established herself as one of the first female conductors.

She studied composition with Rubin Goldmark and Ernest Bloch, and conducting with Eugene Goossens, Robert Heger and Gennaro Papi and conducted many of the world's leading orchestras from the mid-1920s. She was a pioneer of women's opportunity in music performance, composition and conducting.

== Education and marriage ==
Ethel Liggins was born in Hull, Yorkshire, England, to Thomas and Annie Peck Liggins. With support from wealthy patron Mary Emma Wilson, the wife of the shipping magnate Arthur Wilson, she attended the Hoch conservatory in Frankfurt, where she studied piano under James Kwast, and composition under Bernhard Sekles and Iwan Knorr. She also studied in Vienna with the famed Polish pianist and professor, Theodor Leschetizky. She made her debut as a pianist in London in 1902 at the age of 16. In 1905 she went on tour in Australia, and from 1906 performed in Europe under the stage name Ethel Leginska, at the suggestion of British socialite Lady Maud Warrender (the wife of Sir George Warrender). At that time the best top-class musicians were Polish, hence the Polish-sounding name "Leginska" considered advantageous to the development of the young pianist musical career. She kept that name throughout her career and upon her debut in the United States she was dubbed by the press "The Paderewski of women pianists".

In 1907 Leginska married the composer Emerson Whithorne, whom she had met when they both studied in Vienna. They would sometimes perform together, with him playing the second part in two-piano pieces on her recitals and from the time they married through 1909 him serving as her concert manager. He later wrote music criticism for "Musical America" and "Pall Mall Gazette", and as a composer, he had his music performed frequently in the 1920s and 1930s. She and Emerson Whithorne had one son, Cedric Whithorne, born in September 1908 after the couple returned from visiting Whithorne's native United States. They did so at least once prior to their divorce, traveling to Cleveland, OH where Leginska make her unofficial American debut in Cleveland's Hippodrome, a vaudeville theater. Nonetheless, the couple separated in 1910 and divorced in 1916. After an unsuccessful custody fight for her son Cedric, Leginska became even more outspoken about inadequate opportunities for women, stating that self-sacrifice for family's sake is "over-rated" and that "it is impossible for a woman with a career to be unselfish".

== Musical career ==
From her official American debut in New York's Aeolian Hall on 20 January 1913, Leginska's popularity in the U.S. was growing, aided by both the careful staging of her performances, with well-thought-out lighting and decor to focus on the performer, and her distinctive style of dressing (favoring menswear) eagerly copied by her young fans, as well as her diminutive size and her youthful appearance that not only made the musical youth more likely to relate to her, but often misled not only her audiences but even the reviewers who would express their astonishment that a person so "young" displayed such skill as hers (this going on all the way into Leginska's late thirties, as made evident in the Detroit News critic Robert Kelly's description of her perform at 37).

In 1923, Leginska went to London to study orchestral conducting with Eugene Goossens. She also studied conducting with Robert Heger, conductor of the Bavarian State Opera in Munich, proceeding to conduct as guest conductor with major orchestras in Munich, Paris, London or Berlin, taking advantage of her earlier contacts established when she performed as a pianist, as well as agreeing to also perform in a concerto on the programs. Being a woman conductor also helped her attract attention, as a novelty. She conducted a performance of her orchestral suite Quatre sujets barbares. In 1925, she made her debut as a conductor in the United States with the New York Symphony Orchestra in Carnegie Hall, after which she appeared with the Boston People's Orchestra in the spring and then performing at the Hollywood Bowl in the summer of 1925. She had suffered nervous breakdowns in 1909, 1925 and 1926. In 1926 she announced a permanent retirement from performing as a pianist and focused on conducting, composing and teaching.

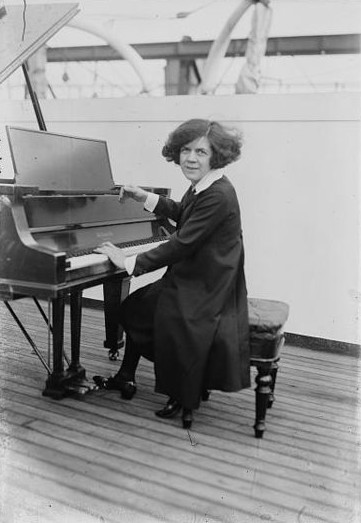
Ethel Leginska sitting at a piano

Though her output as a composer was limited, she distinguished herself as an organizer, establishing the Boston Philharmonic Orchestra which she conducted (1926–27), heading the Boston Woman's Symphony Orchestra (1926-1930) with which she went on two extensive tours. She also directed the Boston English Opera Company, founded the National Women's Symphony Orchestra in New York in 1932 and served as director of the Woman's Symphony Orchestra of Chicago.

== Later life ==
In the late 1930s, when her conducting opportunities began to diminish as her novelty wore off, she left the U.S. again to teach piano in London and Paris, before settling in 1939 in Los Angeles. There she opened a piano studio and became a well-respected teacher. Among her students were Gavin Williamson, James Henry Fields, Daniel Pollack Gray Perry (https://www.amica.org/files/GRAY_PERRY.pdf), and Bruce Sutherland. In 1957 she once again conducted - a Los Angeles performance of her first opera The Rose and the Ring, written in 1932. She died in Los Angeles of a stroke on 26 February 1970, aged 83.

== As teacher ==
In a book by Harriette Brower, Piano Mastery: Talks with Master Pianists and Teachers published in 1915, the following is said about Leginska: "I believe in absolute freedom in all parts of the arm, shoulder to fingertips. Rigidity seems to me the most reprehensible thing when playing the piano, which is the most common of all kinds of performers default."

In 1943, Leginska and her concert manager, Mary V. Holloway, founded the concert series New Ventures in Music with the purpose of introducing her talented young pupils to the public by having them perform works of the great composers in recital. The scope of the concerts were such that by the end of the second year of the series, the two books of Bach's Well-Tempered Clavier as well as all of Beethoven's sonatas and variations had been performed by the young musicians. The third and fourth series of concerts were devoted to the entire works of Chopin and Schumann. The concerts were a great success, receiving accolades from world celebrities such as Bruno Walter, Arthur Rubinstein, and Serge Koussevitsky, and became a fixture of the musical life in Los Angeles. When piano concertos were performed, Leginska hired members of professional orchestras such as the Los Angeles Philharmonic and formed her own "Leginska Little Symphony," which she conducted herself.

== As composer ==
In addition to her concert career, Leginska took courses in harmony with Rubin Goldmark from 1914, and lessons in composition with Ernest Bloch in New York from the summer of 1918 on. She soon followed these classes with composition of a range of pieces for piano and chamber ensembles.

The first work performed in public, which was something rare for a woman at the time, was a string quartet inspired by four texts by the Indian poet Tagore, which won a composition prize in the Berkshire Chamber Music Festival Competition. The symphonic poem Beyond the Fields We Know with the title borrowed from poet Lord Dunsany came shortly after. The Gargoyles of Notre Dame was inspired by Victor Hugo's 1831 novel The Hunchback of Notre-Dame, and her four-movement orchestral suite Quatre sujets barbares is a musical work inspired by the life and paintings of French artist Paul Gauguin. The three movement From a Life for chamber ensemble caused some controversy at its premiere (Aeolian Hall, New York, 9 January 1922) for its "ultra-modern" idiom. She performed in a concert of her piano works in London on 8 July 1922, and gave a concert of her orchestral works at Queen's Hall on 22 November 1922.

Having conducted at leading European opera houses from the early 1930s, Leginska directed the première of her one-act opera Gale for the Chicago City Opera at the Civic Opera House in 1935 with John Charles Thomas in the title role. It the first time a woman conducted her own opera in the history of the city. In 1957 she gave the premiere of her opera The Rose and the Ring, based on William Makepeace Thackeray's story of the same name, in Los Angeles, 25 years after its composition.

== Works ==
Ethel Leginska's body of work is relatively small, consisting of piano pieces and songs, excluding her orchestral works and three operas. Among her major compositions are quartets for strings and piano, four Poems and six nursery rhymes. Many of her works are still unpublished.

=== Melodies ===
- Kalte
- I Have a Rendezvous With Death
- Sorrow
- Quatre mélodies (1919, Ed. Schirmer)
  1. At Dawn (text by Arthur Symons)
  2. Bird Voices of Spring (text C.S. Whittern)
  3. The Frozen Heart (text by Otto Julius Bierbaum)
  4. The Gallows Tree (over text of an old ballade)
- In a Garden' for baritono, tenor, and soprano (words by Ethel Leginska — 1928)
- Six Nursery Rhymes, for soprano ad lib. and piano or chamber orchestra (1925)
  1. Jack and Jill
  2. Three Mice
  3. Sleepe Baby Sleep
  4. Georgy Porgy
  5. Little Boy Blue
  6. Old King Cole
- Forgotten

=== Orchestral ===
- Beyond the Fields We Know, symphonic poem (New York 12 February 1922)
- Quatre sujets barbares, after Paul Gauguin, (Munich 13 December 1924)
- Two Short pieces for orchestra (Boston 29 February 1924 for Pierre Monteux)
- Fantasie for piano and orchestre (New York 3 January 1926)

=== Chamber music ===
- Quatuor à cordes, after four poems by Tagore (Boston, 25 April 1921)
- From a Life, for 13 instruments (New York 9 January 1922)
  1. Allegro energico
  2. Lento dolentissimo
  3. Vivace
- Triptych, for 11 instruments solo (Chicago 29 January 1928)

=== Piano ===
- The Gargoyles of Notre Dame (1920, Ed. Composer's Music Corporation 1922)
- Scherzo after Tagore (1920, Ed. Composer's Music Corporation 1922)
- At Night
- Cradle Song (1922)
- Dance of a Little Clown
- Dance of a Puppet (1924)
- Three Victorian Portraits (Suite in three movements)
  1. Nostalgic Waltz
  2. A Dirge
  3. Heroic Impromptu

=== Opera ===
- Gale, the Haunting, Opera in one act (Chicago 23 November 1935)
- The Rose and the Ring, Opera (1932, Los Angeles 23 February 1957)
- Joan of Arc (Los Angeles 10 May 1969)
