= Bruce Sutherland =

American classical composer

Bruce Sutherland (26 February 1926 – 8 September 2010, in Santa Monica CA) was an American pianist, music educator and composer.

== Life and career ==
Bruce Sutherland studied with Ethel Leginska and Amparo Iturbi. His debut as a pianist was a radio broadcast with the KFI Symphony conducted by James Sample and playing Nights In The Gardens Of Spain by de Falla.

Sutherland became notable as a composer with the prize-winning Allegro Fanfara, which premiered at the International Gottschalk Competition in New Orleans. José Iturbi conducted the Bridgeport Symphony Orchestra with David Bar-Illan performing as piano soloist.

In his latter years, Sutherland became noted as a teacher. Notable students include Max Levinson, John Novacek, and Rufus Choi.

== Works ==
Selected works include:

- Allegro Fanfara
- Work for two pianos
- Prelude
- Sonatina for piano
