= Lili Chookasian =

Opera singer

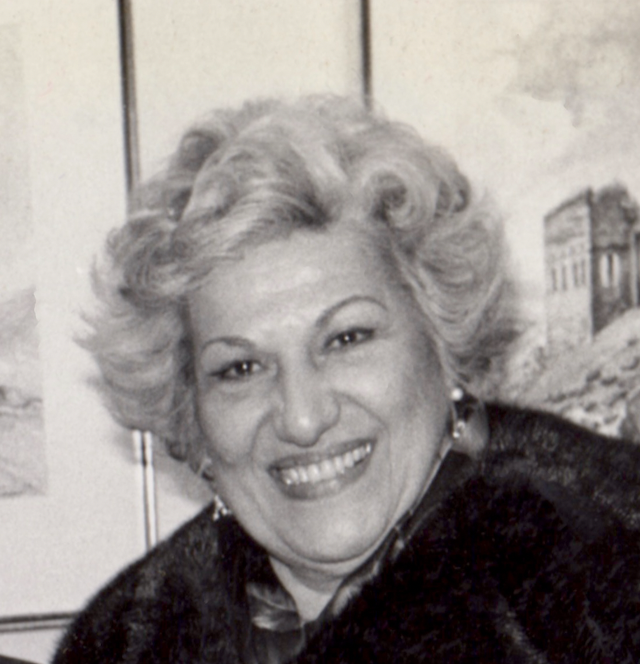
- Born: August 1, 1921; Chicago, Illinois, U.S.
- Died: April 9, 2012 (aged 90); Branford, Connecticut. U.S.
- Occupation(s): Singer (contralto), Metropolitan Opera (1962-1986); Professor, Northwestern University, Yale School of Music
- Spouse: George Gavejian (married 1941-1987)
- Children: 3

Lili Chookasian (August 1, 1921 – April 9, 2012) was an American contralto of Armenian ethnicity, who appeared with many of the world's major symphony orchestras and opera houses. She began her career in the 1940s as a concert singer but did not draw wider acclaim until she began singing opera in her late thirties. She arose as one of the world's leading contraltos during the 1960s and 1970s, and notably had a long and celebrated career at the Metropolitan Opera in New York City from 1962 through 1986. She was admired for her sonorous, focused tone as well as her excellent musicianship. She often chose, against tradition, to sing oratorios from memory.

== Early life and concert career: 1921–1958 ==
Chookasian was born in Chicago, the youngest of three children to immigrants from Armenia. Her family had immigrated to the United States shortly after the Armenian genocide of 1915 which claimed the lives of two of Chookasian's grandparents and several members of her extended family. Chookasian's first language was Armenian, as her parents spoke that language in the home. She only became proficient speaking English through attending school as a child.

Chookasian first became involved with music through singing at local churches and in musical programs at her high school, notably appearing as Buttercup in her school's production of H.M.S. Pinafore. After high school she began studying singing seriously with Philip Manuel and Gavin Williamson, both with whom she took lessons for almost twenty years. In her late teens she started earning money singing for churches and on the radio. In 1941, at the age of twenty, she married George Gavejian who was a friend of her older brother. They had a very happy marriage that lasted for forty-six years, ending when Gavejian died in 1987. They had several children and eleven grandchildren together.

Chookasian began performing professionally as an oratorio and concert singer in the 1940s, mostly in Chicago but also occasionally out of town. The biggest triumph of her early concert career was in January 1955 when she was chosen by Bruno Walter as the contralto soloist for Mahler's Symphony No. 2, "Resurrection" with the Chicago Symphony Orchestra. During this time she was also on the voice faculty at Northwestern University.

In 1956 Chookasian was diagnosed with breast cancer and her physicians gave her six months to live. With the support of her loved ones she decided to fight the cancer. She underwent a radical mastectomy, which was further complicated by a widespread infection that required three additional surgeries. With continuous medical attention and the support of her family she prevailed and her life slowly returned to normal.

== An opera career begins: 1959–1961 ==
It wasn't until 1959, at the age of 38, that Chookasian made her first opera appearance, making her debut as Adalgisa in Bellini's Norma with the Arkansas State Opera (ASO). Edward McGuire, founder and stage director of the ASO, offered her the part after soprano Barbara Stevenson, who sang Norma, recommended her. Stevenson gave McGuire a recording of a Messiah that she had sung with Chookasian in Salt Lake City and, after hearing the recording, McGuire knew he wanted Chookasian to sing the part.

Chookasian's debut performance was a resounding success and a recording of that performance was given to conductor Thomas Schippers by McGuire at the Festival of Two Worlds the following summer. McGuire recalls, "He was astonished by Lili's voice, but he had nothing in mind for her at the time." However, two years later Schippers wanted "that extraordinary Adalgisa from Arkansas" for a concert performance of Prokofiev's Alexander Nevsky with the New York Philharmonic. However, he could not remember her name and was unable to track her down until a chance meeting with Sheldon Soffer tipped him off that she was working with the Baltimore Opera Company under Rosa Ponselle. Chookasian had spent the last year studying under Ponselle and had created her second opera role on stage with the company, Azucena in Verdi's Il trovatore in 1960. Schippers contacted Chookasian to come up for an audition, and after hearing her, she was immediately engaged to sing the music of Amelfa Timoferevna (in Alexander Nevsky) for her New York Philharmonic debut in early 1961.

Shortly after her NYP debut, Chookasian was offered a contract with the Metropolitan Opera by Rudolf Bing but turned it down because she was afraid it would take too much time away from her family. In the summer of 1961 she repeated the music of Amelfa Timoferevna for European debut at the Festival dei Due Mondi, again under the baton of Schippers. She also made her European opera debut at the festival under Schippers as Herodias in Salome. She sang Herodias again just a month later at the Teatro Lirico Giuseppe Verdi and also gave a lauded performance of Mahler's Kindertotenlieder, accompanied by Charles Wadsworth at the Teatro Caio Melisso that summer. The following November she headed back to Baltimore to sing her first Amneris in Verdi's Aida.

In the midst of Chookasian's breakout 1961 season she discovered another lump in her other breast. She told no one, fulfilled her commitments in New York, Baltimore, and Europe, and then finally sought a doctor's care in November 1961 after finishing up performance of Aida. She went through another mastectomy, after which her prognosis was good; the cancer had not spread, and she recovered quickly.

== Metropolitan Opera years: 1962–1986 ==
After returning to the United States, Chookasian was approached by Rudolf Bing again to join the roster at the Metropolitan Opera. This time she relented and made her debut with the company on March 9, 1962 as La Cieca in Ponchielli's La Gioconda with Zinka Milanov in the title role, Franco Corelli as Enzo, Nell Rankin as Laura, Robert Merrill as Barnaba, Giorgio Tozzi as Alvise, and Fausto Cleva conducting. During the performance Francis Robinson, then assistant general manager at the Met, had the house phones hooked up so Rosa Ponselle could hear Chookasian's entrance over the telephone at her home. Ponselle, who had developed a strong personal friendship with Chookasian as well as being her opera mentor, recalled "It not only brought back such wonderful memories, but it was another Force of Destiny." The audience and the critics responded enthusiastically to her performance. Paul Henry Lang wrote in his review that "From what we heard last night, we may predict a splendid career for the young lady from Chicago." This was the beginning of a more than two decade long career at the Met, during which time Chookasian was coached privately with Armen Boyajian.

During her 24-year-long career with the company, Chookasian sang many principal contralto roles and a number of secondary parts. Her roles included Adalgisa, Amneris in Aida, Auntie in Peter Grimes, Azucena, Death in Le Rossignol, Erda in Das Rheingold and Siegfried, Filippyevna in Eugene Onegin, the First Norn in Götterdämmerung, Frugola in Il tabarro, Geneviève in Pelléas et Mélisande, Gertrud in Hansel and Gretel, the Grandmother in Jenůfa, Leocadia Begbick in Rise and Fall of the City of Mahagonny, Madelon in Andrea Chénier, Mamma Lucia in Cavalleria Rusticana, Marthe in Faust, Mary in Der fliegende Holländer, Mistress Quickly in Falstaff, the Nurse in Boris Godunov, the Princess in Suor Angelica, Teresa in La Sonnambula, Ulrica in Un ballo in maschera, the Witch in Hansel and Gretel, and Zita in Gianni Schicchi among others. She also notably sang the role of Maharanee in the United States premiere of Gian Carlo Menotti's The Last Savage in a cast that included George London, Nicolai Gedda, Roberta Peters and Teresa Stratas.

During her career at the Met, Chookasian sang with many great singers like Carlo Bergonzi, Richard Cassilly, Franco Corelli, Phyllis Curtin, Mattiwilda Dobbs, William Dooley, Plácido Domingo, Reri Grist, Anna Moffo, Birgit Nilsson, Leontyne Price, Gail Robinson, Leonie Rysanek, Joan Sutherland, Renata Tebaldi, and Richard Tucker among others. In 1984, during a performance of Rise and Fall of the City of Mahagonny, she suffered a minor heart attack on stage and was unable to continue the performance. After this her performance career slowed down somewhat and her last performance at the Met was on February 17, 1986 as Gertrude in Gounod's Roméo et Juliette with Neil Shicoff as Roméo and Catherine Malfitano as Juliette. Her 290th performance with the company, was also her farewell to the opera stage.

While the Met was her major home, Chookasian also remained active as a concert performer and sang in opera houses both in the United States and Europe. She quickly became one of the leading contraltos performing on the international stage during the 1960s and 1970s, singing under Georg Solti, Leonard Bernstein, James Levine, Zubin Mehta, Seiji Ozawa, Fritz Reiner, Karl Böhm, Herbert von Karajan, Lorin Maazel, and many other great conductors, with such ensembles as the Philadelphia Orchestra, the Cleveland Orchestra, the London Symphony Orchestra, and the Vienna Philharmonic among others. She was particularly admired worldwide for her performances in Beethoven's Symphony No. 9, Mahler's Das Lied von der Erde, Schoenberg's Gurre-Lieder and above all Verdi's Requiem. Of the latter work Chookasian stated, "Every note of the Requiem seemed written for my throat". Under Eugene Ormandy she recorded Das Lied von der Erde for Columbia Masterworks, and she opened the Saratoga Performing Arts Center in August 1966, again with Ormandy. With Leonard Bernstein, she was one of the many soloists in his recording of Mahler's Symphony No. 8. Among her many other recordings are Beethoven's Symphony No. 9 with the New York Philharmonic under Bernstein, the First Norn in Götterdämmerung with the Berlin Philharmonic under Herbert von Karajan, and Verdi's Requiem with the Boston Symphony Orchestra under Erich Leinsdorf.

On the opera stage Chookasian returned to the Spoleto Festival in 1962 to sing Clarissa in Prokofiev's The Love for Three Oranges. In 1963 she made her first of several appearances at the New York City Opera in the title role of Menotti's The Medium. She made her first appearance at the Bayreuth festival in 1965 singing in three of her Wagner roles: Mary, the First Norn, and Erda. In 1966 she made her first appearances with the Opéra de Montréal and the American Opera Society. In 1970 she made her debut with the San Francisco Opera as Mistress Quickly. In 1973 she sang Amneris at the Palacio de Bellas Artes in Mexico City and sang Erda in Siegfried for her debut with the Lyric Opera of Chicago. In 1976 she notably sang in the world premiere of Thomas Pasatieri's Inés de Castro and sang Ulrica with the Philadelphia Lyric Opera Company. She also appeared with the Zurich Opera, the Salzburg Festival, the New Orleans Opera, the Houston Grand Opera, and other companies in the United States and Europe. Chookasian would often bring her husband with her when she traveled as his work in real estate was flexible enough for him to travel. Chookasian fondly recounted one of her most memorable trips to Yerevan, Armenia in a 1997 Opera News interview. Chookasian was invited to the city to perform in two productions mounted in her honor: Amneris in Aida and the Armenian composer Tigran Chukhajian's opera Arshak II.

After retiring from the stage in 1986, Chookasian joined the voice faculty at Yale University's School of Music. She taught at Yale and resided in Branford, Connecticut. In 2002 she was awarded Yale's Sanford Medal.

She died at her home in Branford at the age of 90 in 2012.
