= Leon Fleisher =

American pianist and conductor (1928–2020)

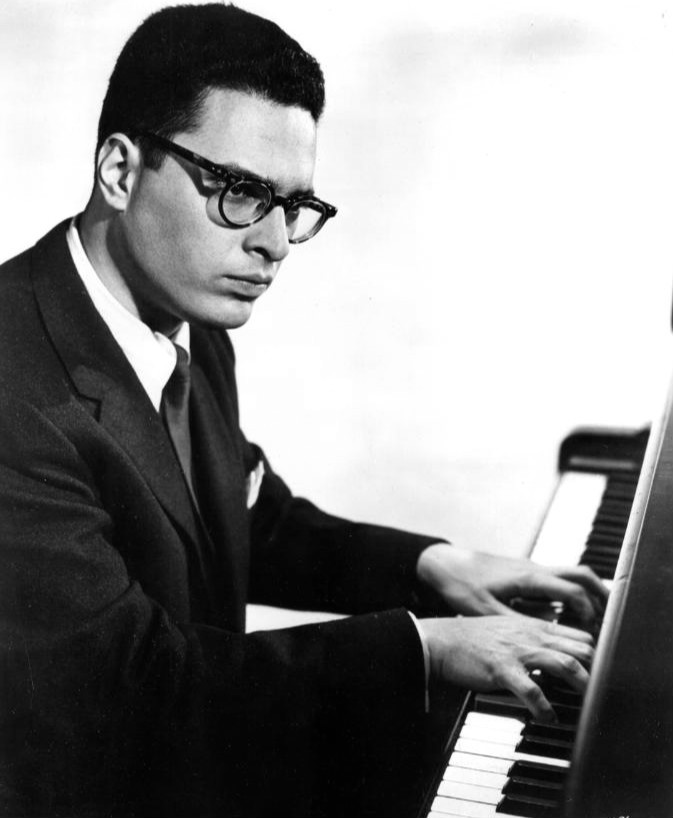
- Fleisher in 1963
- Born: July 23, 1928; San Francisco, California, U.S.
- Died: August 2, 2020 (aged 92); Baltimore, Maryland, U.S.
- Occupations: Classical pianist; Conductor; Pedagogue
- Organizations: Peabody Conservatory of Music; Curtis Institute of Music; The Royal Conservatory of Music
- Awards: Queen Elisabeth Competition; Order of Arts and Letters; Kennedy Center Honors
- Website: www.leonfleisher.com

Leon Fleisher (July 23, 1928 – August 2, 2020) was an American classical pianist, conductor, and pedagogue. He was one of the most renowned pianists and pedagogues in the world. Music correspondent Elijah Ho called him "one of the most refined and transcendent musicians the United States has ever produced".

Born in San Francisco, Fleisher began playing piano at the age of four, and began studying with Artur Schnabel at age nine. He was particularly well known for his interpretations of the two piano concertos of Brahms and the five concertos of Beethoven, which he recorded with George Szell and the Cleveland Orchestra. With Szell, he also recorded concertos by Mozart, Grieg, Schumann, Franck, and Rachmaninoff.

In 1964, he lost the use of his right hand due to a neurological condition eventually diagnosed as focal dystonia, forcing him to focus on the repertoire for the left hand, such as Ravel's Piano Concerto for the Left Hand and many compositions written for him. In 2004, he played the world premiere of Paul Hindemith's Klaviermusik, a piano concerto for the left hand completed in 1923, with the Berlin Philharmonic. After being treated by neurologist Daniel B. Drachman, he regained some control of his right hand and played and recorded two-hand repertoire again.

He was also notable as a conductor, and especially as a teacher for over 60 years at the Peabody Institute at Johns Hopkins University, the Curtis Institute of Music and others. He was a Kennedy Center Honors awardee in 2007, among many distinctions.

== Early life and studies ==
Fleisher was born on July 23, 1928, in San Francisco, the son of poor Jewish immigrants Bertha and Isidor Fleisher. His father was from Odessa and his mother from Poland. His father's business was hat-making, while his mother's goal was to make her son a great concert pianist. Fleisher started studying the piano at age four, and made his public debut at eight. At age nine, he became one of the few child prodigies to be accepted for study with the renowned Austrian teacher Artur Schnabel, who taught him in a tradition that descended directly from Beethoven through Carl Czerny and Theodor Leschetizky. He also studied with Maria Curcio and Karl Ulrich Schnabel. Fleisher played at Carnegie Hall with the New York Philharmonic under Pierre Monteux at age 16; Monteux called him "the pianistic find of the century."

== Performer and recording artist ==
In the 1950s, Fleisher signed an exclusive recording contract with Columbia Masterworks. He was particularly well known for his interpretations of the piano concerti of Brahms and Beethoven, which he recorded with George Szell and the Cleveland Orchestra. They also recorded Mozart's Piano Concerto No. 25, the Grieg and Schumann piano concertos, Franck's Symphonic Variations, and Rachmaninoff's Rhapsody on a Theme of Paganini.

When he was 24, Fleisher became the first American to win a prestigious piano competition established by Queen Elisabeth of Belgium, which helped to catapult his career. In 1964, at the age of 36, Fleisher lost the use of his right hand, due to a neurological condition that was eventually diagnosed as focal dystonia. In 1967, Fleisher commenced performing and recording the left-handed repertoire while searching for a cure for his condition. His first choice was Ravel's Piano Concerto for the Left Hand. In addition, he undertook conducting beginning in 1968, and became associate conductor of the Baltimore Symphony Orchestra in 1973, and music director of the Annapolis Symphony Orchestra. In the 1990s, Fleisher was able to ameliorate his focal dystonia symptoms after experimental botox injections to the point where he could play with both hands again.

In 2004 Vanguard Classics released Fleisher's first "two-handed" recording since the 1960s, titled Two Hands, to critical acclaim. Two Hands is also the title of a short documentary on Fleisher by Nathaniel Kahn, which was nominated for an Academy Award for best short subject on January 23, 2007. Fleisher received the 2007 Kennedy Center Honors. Kennedy Center Chairman Stephen A. Schwarzman described him as "a consummate musician whose career is a moving testament to the life-affirming power of art."

Fleisher's musical interests extended beyond the central German Classic-Romantic repertoire. The American composer William Bolcom composed his Concerto for Two Pianos, Left Hand for Fleisher and his close friend Gary Graffman, who has also suffered from debilitating problems with his right hand. It received its first performance in Baltimore in April 1996. The concerto is so constructed that it can be performed in one of three ways, with either piano part alone with a reduced orchestra, or with both piano parts and the two reduced orchestras combined into a full orchestra. Composers who wrote music for him also included Lukas Foss, Leon Kirchner and Gunther Schuller.

In 2004, Fleisher played the world premiere of Paul Hindemith's Klaviermusik (Piano Concerto for the Left Hand), Op. 29, with the Berlin Philharmonic conducted by Simon Rattle. This work was written in 1923, for Paul Wittgenstein, who disliked and refused to play it. However, he had sole performing rights and kept the score, not allowing any other pianists to play it. The manuscript was discovered among his papers after the death of his widow in 2002. On October 2, 2005, Fleisher played the American premiere of the work, with the San Francisco Symphony under Herbert Blomstedt. In 2012, at the invitation of Justice Ruth Bader Ginsburg, Fleisher performed at the Supreme Court of the United States.

He continued to be involved in music, both conducting and teaching, for more than 60 years at the Peabody Institute of the Johns Hopkins University, the Curtis Institute of Music, and the Royal Conservatory of Music in Toronto; he was also closely associated with the Tanglewood Music Center. With Dina Koston, he co-founded and co-directed the Theater Chamber Players in 1968–2003, which was the first resident chamber ensemble of the Smithsonian Institution and of the Pedagogy. His students include Frank Lévy, André Watts, Yefim Bronfman, Hélène Grimaud, Louis Lortie, Dina Koston, Jonathan Biss, Lori Sims, Nicholas Angelich, Joel Fan, Enrique Graf, and Galen Deibler.

His memoir, My Nine Lives, co-written with The Washington Post's music critic Anne Midgette, was published in November 2010.

== Death ==
Fleisher died in Baltimore, Maryland, on August 2, 2020, at age 92.

== Awards and recognition ==
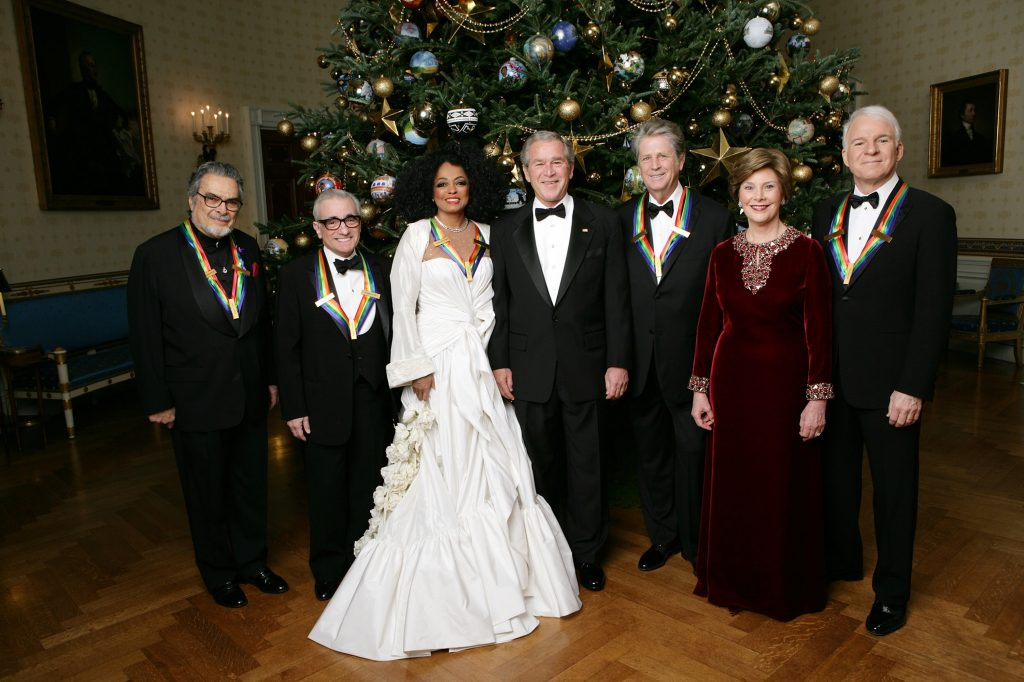
President George W. Bush and First Lady Laura Bush with the 2007 Kennedy Center Honorees at the White House. From left: Fleisher, Martin Scorsese, Diana Ross, Brian Wilson and Steve Martin

- 1952: Gold medal, Queen Elisabeth Music Competition
- 1992: Fellow of the American Academy of Arts and Sciences
- 1994: Instrumentalist of the Year, Musical America
- 2005: President's Medal, Johns Hopkins University
- 2006: Commander in the Order of Arts and Letters by the Minister of Culture of the French government
- 2007: Kennedy Center Honors
- 2010: Instrumentalist of the Year, Royal Philharmonic Society
- 2021: The Leon Fleisher Academy in Washington, D.C., named in his honor

=== Honorary doctorates ===
- Towson State University
- Boston Conservatory
- University of Cincinnati
- Cleveland Institute of Music
- San Francisco Conservatory of Music
- St. Olaf College
- Amherst College
- Juilliard School of Music
- Peabody Institute of the Johns Hopkins University

== Discography ==
- 1956: Schubert: Sonata in B-flat major, D. 960 / Ländler (original LP release), Sony BMG Masterworks, 2008 (digital re-release)
- 1956/1958/1962: Brahms: Piano Concertos Nos. 1 (rec. 1958) and 2 (rec. 1962), with the Cleveland Orchestra led by Szell; Handel Variations and Waltzes, Op. 39 (rec. 1956); Sony Masterworks, remastered and reissued 1997
- 1959: Debussy: Suite bergamasque / Ravel: Sonatine / Valses nobles et sentimentales / Alborado del gracioso (original LP release), Sony BMG Masterworks, 2008 (digital re-release)
- 1959–61: Beethoven: The Five Piano Concertos, with the Cleveland Orchestra led by Szell (original recordings, remastered), Sony BMG Masterworks, reissued 1990 and in new remastering 2006
- 1960: Schumann: Piano Concerto and Grieg: Piano Concerto with the Cleveland Orchestra and George Szell (original recordings, remastered and reissued 2004 by Sony BMG)
- 1960: Liszt: Sonata in B minor / Weber: Sonata No. 4 in E minor, Op. 70 / Invitation to the Dance, Op. 65 (original LP release), Sony BMG Masterworks, 2008 (digital re-release)
- 1960: Mozart: Sonata in C major, K. 330 / Sonata in E-flat major, K. 282 / Rondo in D major, K. 485 (original LP release), Sony BMG Masterworks, 2008 (digital re-release)
- 1963: Brahms: Quintet for Piano and Strings in F minor, Op. 34 (original LP release), with the Juilliard String Quartet Sony BMG Masterworks, 2008 (digital re-release)
- 1963: Copland: Piano Sonata / Sessions: 'From My Diary' / Kirchner: Piano Sonata / Rorem: Three Barcarolles (original LP release), Sony BMG Masterworks, 2008 (digital re-release)
- 1990 reissued: Mozart Piano Concerto No. 25, with the Cleveland Orchestra led by George Szell Sony Classical
- 1993: Leon Fleisher Recital, Sony Classical
- 1993: Ravel, Prokofiev, Britten: Piano Works for the Left Hand, Sony Classical
- 2004: Leon Fleisher: Two Hands, (including a 2004 recording of Schubert: Sonata in B-flat major, D. 960), Vanguard Classics, 2004
- 2006: The Journey, Vanguard Classics
- 2007: Brahms: Quintet for Piano and Strings in F minor, Op. 34, recorded with the Emerson String Quartet for Deutsche Grammophon
- 2008: The Essential Leon Fleisher, Sony BMG Masterworks
- 2009: Mozart: Piano Concertos, including 2008 recordings of the Piano Concertos in A major, K. 414 and K. 488, with Fleisher as soloist and conductor of the Stuttgarter Kammerorchester, and of the concerto K. 242 with Katherine Jacobson Fleisher (his wife) as second pianist. Sony BMG Masterworks
- 2013: Leon Fleisher: The Complete Album Collection, Sony Classical Records
- 2014: All the Things You Are, Bridge Records
