= Klaviermusik mit Orchester =

1923 piano concerto by Paul Hindemith

- Klavier nur linke Hand
- Piano concerto by Paul Hindemith
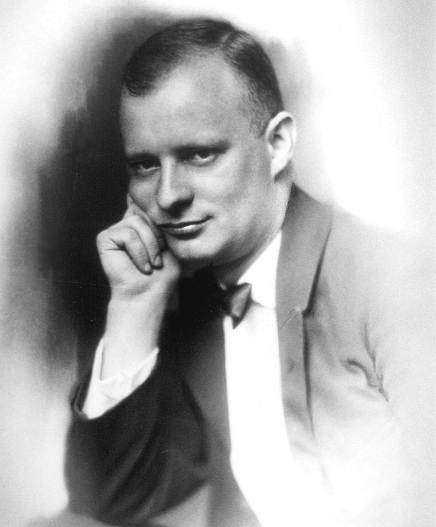
- The composer in 1923
- Opus: 29
- Composed: 1923
- Dedication: "für Herrn Paul Wittgenstein"
- Performed: 9 December 2004: Berlin
- Published: 2003: Mainz by Schott
- Duration: 16:00
- Movements: 4

Klaviermusik mit Orchester (Piano music with orchestra), Op. 29, is a 1923 piano concerto by Paul Hindemith. Subtitled Klavier nur linke Hand, it is a piano concerto for the left hand alone. It was commissioned by the pianist Paul Wittgenstein, who lost his right arm in the World War. He never played the piece, and when he died, his widow refused access to the score. The premiere, after her death, was played in Berlin in 2004, with Leon Fleisher as the soloist and the Berlin Philharmonic conducted by Simon Rattle. It was published by Schott.

== History ==
Hindemith composed the music in 1923 to a commission by the pianist Paul Wittgenstein. He and his brother, the philosopher Ludwig Wittgenstein, belonged to a wealthy family of industrialists in Vienna. Paul Wittgenstein lost his right arm in the World War. To continue his career, he arranged works for left hand alone, and he commissioned left-hand piano pieces from leading composers of the 1920s, for his exclusive use, including Benjamin Britten, who composed Diversions, Erich Korngold's Piano Concerto for the Left Hand, Ravel's Piano Concerto for the Left Hand, Prokofiev's Piano Concerto No. 4, works by Franz Schmidt, and Parergon and Panathenäenzug by Richard Strauss.

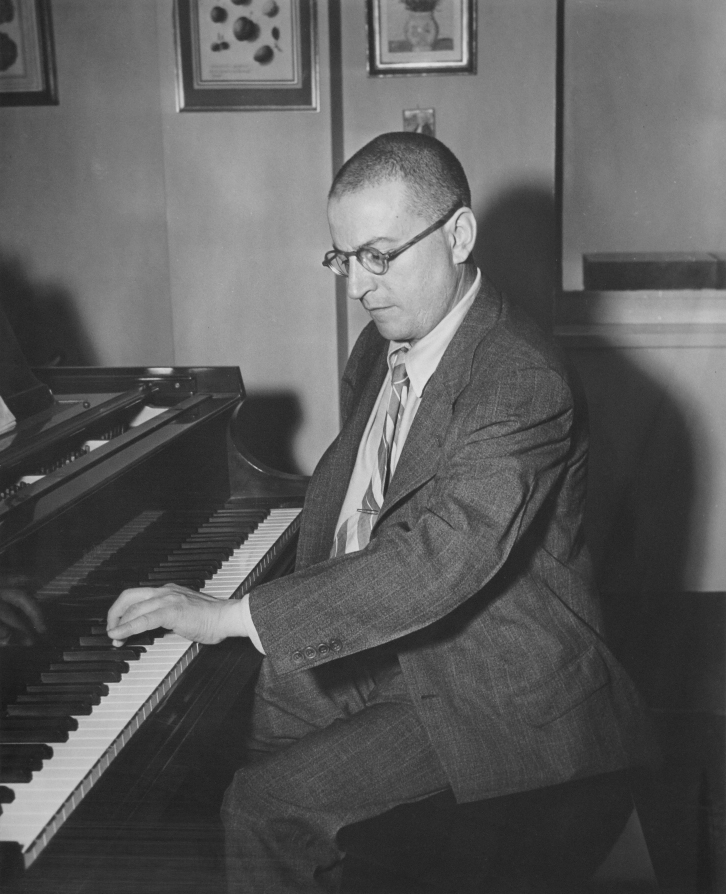
Wittgenstein at the piano

Hindemith was regarded as a promising young composer of Neue Sachlichkeit. His short operas Mörder, Hoffnung der Frauen and Das Nusch-Nuschi were premiered at the Staatsoper Stuttgart in 1921, and he was in the process of composing concertos entitled Kammermusik. He received the commission from Wittgenstein possibly at the end of 1922. The US$1,000 that came with it enabled the composer, originally from a poor background, to acquire the Kuhhirtenturm as his home from the city of Frankfurt. In a note added to the first mailing of the music in May 1923, he wrote:

"Here are the three final movements of your piece and I hope that your shock will subside after perusing the score. It is a simple, completely unproblematic piece and I am sure that you will enjoy it after a time. (Perhaps you are appalled at first, but that does not matter.) In any case, you will surely understand the piece – in case of any doubt I will always be there to give you precise information."

Once Hindemith had delivered the completed work in 1923, Wittgenstein settled his financial obligations to the composer, but, disliking the piece, he never played it. His death in 1961 brought to an end his exclusive performance rights, but his widow refused access to the score. Only after her death, in 2001, did an executor make the score available, to the Foundation Hindemith in Switzerland. It was examined, and found to be not the composer's manuscript, but a handwritten copy by an unknown author. Comparison with Hindemith's extant short-score sketches for the last three movements confirmed that it was the best available source for the work, while both Hindemith's manuscript and what he sent to Wittgenstein were considered missing. Schott published a version based on the copy from Wittgenstein's estate with corrections based on Hindemith's sketches in 2004.

The concerto, following this version, finally received its world premiere in Berlin on 9 December 2004, with Leon Fleisher as the soloist, and the Berlin Philharmonic conducted by Simon Rattle. Fleisher had lost control of his right hand for many years, due to a neurological disorder, and played many of the works Wittgenstein had commissioned. On 2 October 2005, Fleisher played the American premiere of the work, with the San Francisco Symphony conducted by Herbert Blomstedt.

After the premiere, autographs of the piano part and the orchestral score which Wittgenstein had used were found in the manuscript collection of Arthur Wilhelm (1899–1962), a national economist from Basel, which entered his collection at an unknown time. Fingerings in the autographs by Wittgenstein proved that he had not rejected the work immediately, but after having studied the music. The material was transferred to the Paul Sacher Foundation, making it available to researchers.

== Structure and music ==
The music is in four movements, which are played without a break:

1. Einleitung – Mäßig schnelle Halbe
2. Sehr lebhafte Halbe
3. Trio, Basso ostinato – Langsame Viertel, nur sehr wenig Ausdruck.
4. Finale – Bewegte Halbe

Composition began with the second movement, a lively alla breve, completed on 22 February 1923. The third movement, a trio with a basso ostinato, in slow common time, marked "with little expression", was finished on 27 February. The finale, in moving alla breve, was completed in April. The first movement was composed last, an introduction in moderate alla breve, and finished on 24 May. The duration is given as c. 16 minutes, c. 18 minutes, and c. 20 minutes.

The outer movements have been described as showing Hindemith's "abrasive early modernism at its finest". The slow Trio is like chamber music, and longer than the two first movements together. A reviewer noted that it mixes Bach and blues, with the piano contrasting solo woodwinds over an ostinato pizzicato bass. A reviewer at Gramophone described the finale as "chatteringly energetic".

Overall, the piano is used for figuration rather than melodies, following the normal role of the left hand in piano music. The work shows similarities to a baroque concerto, described as neo-baroque "with jazz influences and touches of humour".

=== Instrumentation ===
The work is scored for solo piano (left hand) and an orchestra consisting of two flutes (2. doubling piccolo), two oboes, English horn, clarinet in E♭, two clarinets in A and B♭, bass clarinet in B♭, two bassoons, two horns in F, two trumpets in C, three trombones, timpani, four percussionists, and strings.

== Recording ==
Fleisher was the soloist in the first recording of the work, with the Curtis Symphony conducted by Christoph Eschenbach in 2009, coupled with Dvořák's Symphony No. 9, from a concert at the Verizon Hall in Philadelphia on 27 April 2008, played by an orchestra of students and teachers of the Curtis Institute of Music.

It was recorded in a collection of Hindemith's complete piano concertos, played by soloist İdil Biret and the Yale Symphony Orchestra conducted by Toshiyuki Shimada. She plays Klaviermusik, the first of the concertos and the last premiered, polished and "with a relaxed approach".
