= Dina Koston =

American pianist, music educator and composer

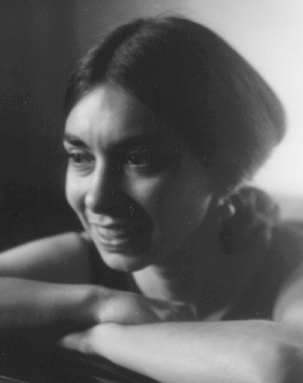
Dina Koston

Dina Koston (b. 1929?, d. 2009, Washington, D.C.) was an American pianist, music educator and composer.

== Life and career ==
Dina Koston began the study of music at age two with her mother. She continued her studies at the American Conservatory of Music and later studied with Gavin Williamson in harpsichord, Mieczyslaw Horszowski and Leon Fleisher in piano, and with Luciano Berio and Nadia Boulanger. She spent one summer studying at Darmstadt.

Koston taught at the Peabody Conservatory and at Tanglewood. She wrote music for theatrical productions at Café La Mama and the Arena Stage. With Leon Fleisher she co-founded and co-directed the Theater Chamber Players from 1968-2003, which was the first resident chamber ensemble of the Smithsonian Institution and of The Kennedy Center.

Koston married Dr. Roger L. Shapiro (1927-2002), a research psychiatrist and psychoanalyst. She suffered from a long illness at the end of her life and died in Washington, D.C. A bequest after her death established the Dina Koston and Roger Shapiro Fund for New Music. This fund provides for commissions and performance of new music at the Library of Congress in Washington, D.C.

== Works ==
Koston composed for a variety of instruments. Selected works include:

- In Memory of Jeannette Walters
- Trio Brasso
- Flourishes
- Reflections
- Messages
- Solo for clarinet
- Wordplay
- Distant Intervals

Her work is recorded and available on media including:

- Leon Fleisher: All the Things You Are (2014)
