= Philip Manuel =

American pianist, harpsichordist and music educator (1893–1959)

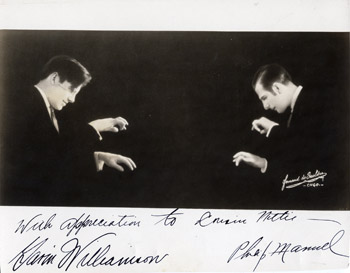
- Gavin Williamson and Philip Manuel
- Born: 1893; Canton, Minnesota, USA
- Died: 1959 (aged 65–66); Chicago, Illinois, USA
- Occupation(s): American pianist, organist, harpsichordist and music educator

Philip Manuel (1893 – October 6, 1959) was an American pianist, organist, harpsichordist and music educator. With pianist, organist and harpsichordist Gavin Williamson, he formed a duo in 1922, known as Manuel and Williamson, that helped promote the use of harpsichords as concert instruments. In the spring of 1935, the duo were the first professionals to play Bach's Concerto for Four Harpsichords, BWV 1065, in the United States on this instrument.

== Life and career ==
Philip Manuel was of Portuguese and British descent. He began the study of music at a military school with piano teachers who traveled from town to town. He attended Grinnell College in Iowa, where he studied in both the academic and music departments. Following his graduation, he traveled to Vienna to study organ, piano and singing, and then to London. After a time teaching at the University of North Dakota, he moved to Chicago. He served overseas during the War.

His was slim, quiet, and scholarly. He wore pince-nez instead of spectacles, and tended to stick out his tongue during crucial moments of a musical programme.

Manuel's first professional association was as a tenor singer to pianist Gavin Williamson (1897–1989). In 1916 at the University of Chicago, the two men discovered a common interest in harpsichord as a concert instrument. In the 1920s, there were fewer than 50 harpsichords in the United States, most located in museums. Manuel and Williamson went to Paris, where they studied for many years with Wanda Landowska and contracted with Pleyel et Cie to produce two instruments for their use. With these instruments, they initiated concert tours of the United States, and also worked as teachers of harpsichord, piano and voice. The two frequently played with the Chicago Symphony Orchestra, and were broadcast on the National Broadcasting Company radio network.

Manuel died in Chicago at age 66. Notable students include Lili Chookasian.

== Discography ==
- Bach: Concerto in C major for 3 Harpsichords and Strings / Rameau: Les cyclopes – Manuel and Williamson Harpsichord Ensemble, members of the Chicago Symphony Orchestra (1948)
- Bach Concerto in C major for 2 Harpsichords and Strings/ Couperin: Musette de Taverny – Manuel and Williamson, members of the Chicago Symphony Orchestra (1948)
