= Men's Light-Contact at WAKO World Championships 2007 Belgrade -89 kg =

The men's 89 kg (195.8 lbs) Light-Contact category at the W.A.K.O. World Championships 2007 in Belgrade was the third heaviest of the male Light-Contact tournaments falling between the cruiserweight and heavyweight division when compared to Low-Kick and K-1 weight classes. There were seventeen men from two continents (Europe and Africa) taking part in the competition. Each of the matches was three rounds of two minutes each and were fought under Light-Contact rules.

Due to there being too few contestants for a thirty-two man tournament, fifteen of the fighters got a bye through to the second round. The tournament winner the Russian Ildar Gabbasov who defeated the Britain's Gavin Williamson by unanimous decision in the final to claim the gold medal. Semi finalists Yohann Lemair from France and Juso Prosic from Austria were rewarded with bronze medals.

== Results ==
1st Round
(Slovenia) David Nagode
(Poland) Konrad Roszkowski	D(3:0)

2nd Round
(Turkey) Omer Kulga
(France) Yohann Lemair	TKO
(Serbia) Stevo Pavlovic
(Spain) Pablo Ramos	D(2:1)
(Republic of Ireland) Dave Lawton
(Russia) Ildar Gabbasov	D(3:0)
(Germany) Fabian Fingerhut	D(3:0)
(Morocco) Soufiane Khabchach
(Sweden) Cristoffer Winslott
(Austria) Juso Prosic	D(3:0)
(Hungary) Szabolcs Molnar
(Poland) Konrad Roszkowski	D(3:0)
(Italy) Sebastiano La Spina	D(2:1)
(Croatia) Marko Delic
(Slovakia) Michal Sedlacek
(United Kingdom) Gavin Williamson	D(3:0)

Quarter Finals
(France) Yohann Lemair	D(3:0)
(Spain) Pablo Ramos
(Russia) Ildar Gabbasov	D(2:1)
(Germany) Fabian Fingerhut
(Austria) Juso Prosic	D(2:1)
(Poland) Konrad Roszkowski
(Italy) Sebastiano La Spina
(United Kingdom) Gavin Williamson	D(3:0)

Semi Finals
(France) Yohann Lemair
(Russia) Ildar Gabbasov	D(3:0)
(Austria) Juso Prosic
(United Kingdom) Gavin Williamson	D(2:1)

Final
(Russia) Ildar Gabbasov	D(3:0)
(United Kingdom) Gavin Williamson

=== Key ===
Abbreviation	Meaning
D (3:0)	Decision (Unanimous)
D (2:1)	Decision (Split)
TKO	Technical Knockout

== See also ==
- List of WAKO Amateur World Championships
- List of WAKO Amateur European Championships
- List of male kickboxers
