= Gavin Williamson (harpsichordist) =

American pianist, harpsichordist and music educator

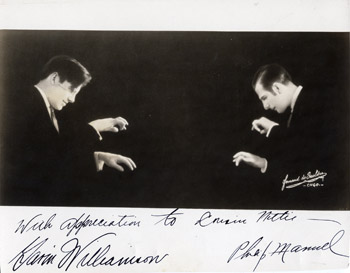
- Philip Manuel and Gavin Williamson
- Born: 1897; Winnipeg, Canada
- Died: 1989 (aged 91–92); Chicago, USA
- Education: Artur Schnabel; Ethel Leginska; Theodor Leschetizky
- Alma mater: University of Chicago
- Occupations: Pianist, harpsichordist, organist, music educator

Gavin Williamson (Winnipeg -1897, and died in Chicago - 1989). He was an American pianist, harpsichordist, organist, and music educator. With pianist Philip Manuel, he formed a duo in 1922 that helped promote the professional use of harpsichords in the United States.

== Life and career ==
Gavin Williamson was born in Winnipeg, Manitoba. He studied music at the University of Chicago and was a Fellow of Oxford University studying with Artur Schnabel, Ethel Leginska, and Theodor Leschetizky.

At the University of Chicago, Williamson met Philip Manuel (1893 – 1959) and the two developed an interest in the harpsichord as a concert instrument. At this time in the 1920s, there were fewer than 50 harpsichords in the United States, most located in museums. The two men went to Paris in search of a builder, where they contracted with Pleyel et Cie to produce two instruments for their use. With these instruments, they initiated concert tours of the United States, and also worked as teachers of harpsichord, piano, and voice. The two frequently played with the Chicago Symphony Orchestra and were broadcast on the National Broadcasting Company radio network.

After his partner died in 1959, Williamson continued this career as a solo performer and music teacher. He died in Chicago at age 92. Notable students include Alexander Frey, Rosalyn Tureck, and Dina Koston.

== Discography ==
- Concerto in C Major for 3 Harpsichords and Strings / Les cyclopes - Manuel and Williamson Harpsichord Ensemble with the Chicago Symphony Orchestra (1948)
- Concerto in C Major for 2 Harpsichords and Strings/Musette de Taverny - Manuel and Williamson with the Chicago Symphony Orchestra (1948)

== See also ==
- Philip Manuel
- Ethel Leginska
- Artur Schnabel
- Theodor Leschetizky
