= Harpsichordist =

Person who plays the harpsichord

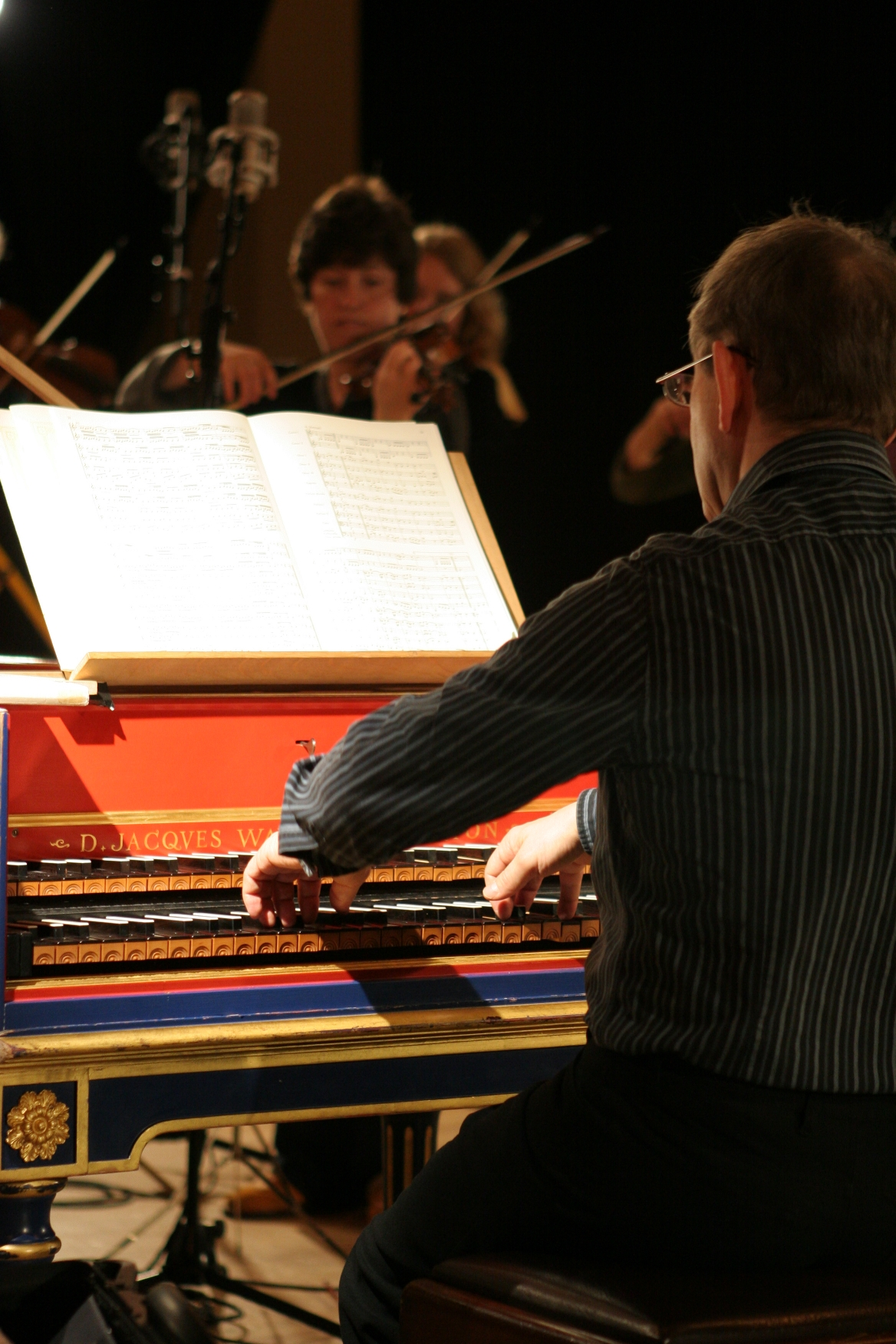
Trevor Pinnock at the harpsichord

A harpsichordist is a person who plays the harpsichord. Harpsichordists may play as soloists, as accompanists, as chamber musicians, or as members of an orchestra, or some combination of these roles. Solo harpsichordists may play unaccompanied sonatas for harpsichord or concertos accompanied by orchestra. Accompanist harpsichordists might accompany singers or instrumentalists (e.g., a violinist or Baroque flute player), either playing works written for a voice (or an instrument) and harpsichord or an orchestral reduction of the orchestra parts. Chamber musician harpsichordists could play in small groups of instrumentalists, such as a quartet or quintet. Baroque-style orchestras and opera pit orchestras typically have a harpsichordist to play the chords in the basso continuo part.

== History ==
Many baroque composers played the harpsichord, including Johann Sebastian Bach, Domenico Scarlatti, George Frideric Handel, François Couperin and Jean-Philippe Rameau. At this time, it was common for such musicians also to play the organ, and all keyboard instruments, and to direct orchestral music while playing continuo on the instrument.

Modern harpsichord playing can be roughly divided into three eras, beginning with the career of the influential reviver of the instrument, Wanda Landowska. At this stage of the 'harpsichord revival', players generally used harpsichords of a heavy, piano-influenced type made by makers such as Pleyel; the revival of the instrument also led some composers to write specifically for the instrument, often on the request of Landowska. An influential later group of English players using post-Pleyel instruments by Thomas Goff and the Goble family included George Malcolm and Thurston Dart.

Beginning in the 1920s, Gavin Williamson and Philip Manuel also helped popularize the harpsichord through concert tours, and were the world's only full-time harpsichord duo, known as Manuel and Williamson, performing throughout North American and Europe. They had studied for many years with Wanda Landowska both in France and in New York. In the 1930s Manual and Williamson made the first recordings of the Bach multiple-keyboard concerti with members of the Chicago Symphony Orchestra, and the duo also gave the American premiere performance of Bach's Concerto in C major for two harpsichords. In addition, they gave American premieres of many works of Couperin and Rameau, among other composers.

The next generation of harpsichordists were pioneers of modern performance on instruments built according to the authentic practices of the earlier period, following the research of such scholar-builders as Frank Hubbard and William Dowd. This generation of performers included such players as Isohlde Ahlgrimm, Ralph Kirkpatrick, Igor Kipnis, Karl Richter and Gustav Leonhardt. More recently, many outstanding harpsichordists have appeared, such as Scott Ross, Trevor Pinnock, Kenneth Gilbert, Christopher Hogwood, Pieter-Jan Belder, Richard Egarr, Jos van Immerseel, Laurence Cummings, Ton Koopman, William Christie, Gary Cooper, David Schrader, Alexei Lubimov, and John Butt, with many of them also directing a baroque orchestra from the instrument.

== Careers ==
Harpsichord, like other art music instruments, is typically studied in a post-secondary university or music conservatory program, leading to a diploma or degree. As harpsichord playing requires an extensive knowledge of Baroque performance practice (regarding realizing figured bass parts, adding ornaments, playing with correct style and articulation), harpsichordists may take courses in Baroque music history. There is a tradition for some harpsichordists, dating back to Thurston Dart (1921 –1971) to combine historical musicology research and harpsichord playing. Since a professional Baroque keyboard player may be asked to play some pieces on pipe organ or portative organ (Ton Koopman is an example of a harpsichordist/organist), harpsichordists may also study organ. Some harpsichordists develop an interest in a wider range of early music, and they may study the fortepiano, a forerunner to the modern piano.

With the exception of joining a Baroque orchestra, most harpsichord jobs are likely to be contracts for individual concerts or a series of concerts. Like other Classical and Baroque instrumentalists, harpsichordists may also teach their instrument, either in private lessons or at a university or conservatory. A harpsichordist with an advanced knowledge of singing may be able to become a vocal coach or choir conductor (George Malcolm (1917–1997) was a harpsichordist and choirmaster). A harpsichordist with an advanced knowledge of orchestral music and conducting might become a conductor, in the Baroque tradition, in which the conductor leads from the keyboard, like Trevor Pinnock.

== See also ==
- List of harpsichordists
- List of French harpsichordists
